= Maishan (East Syriac ecclesiastical province) =

The Metropolitanate of Maishan or Maysan was an East Syriac metropolitan province of the Church of the East between the fifth and thirteenth centuries. The historical region of Maishan or Maysan (Syriac: ܡܝܫܢ) is situated in southern Iran. The metropolitans of Maishan sat at Prath d'Maishan (Syriac: ܦܪܬ ܕܡܝܫܢ), and for most of its history the province had three suffragan dioceses, at Karka d'Maishan (Syriac: ܟܪܟܐ ܕܡܝܫܢ), Rima (Syriac: ܪܝܡܐ) and Nahargur (Syriac: ܢܗܪܓܘܪ). The last metropolitan of Maishan, the noted East Syriac author Shlemun (Solomon) of Basra, is attested in 1222, and it is not clear when the province ceased to exist.

== Background ==
The province of Maishan was one of the six metropolitan provinces created by the Church of the East at the synod of Isaac in 410. The bishop of Prath d'Maishan was recognised as 'metropolitan of Karka d'Maishan, of Rima, of Nahargur, and of their bishops' in Canon XXI of the synod. He ranked fourth in precedence, after the metropolitan bishops of Seleucia, Beth Lapat and Nisibis and before the metropolitan bishops of Erbil and Karka d'Beth Slokh.

The province of Maishan seems to have come to an end in the thirteenth century. The metropolitan diocese of Prath d'Maishan is last mentioned in 1222, and the suffragan dioceses of Nahargur, Karka d'Maishan (Dastumisan), and Rima (Nahr al-Dayr) probably ceased to exist rather earlier. The diocese of Nahargur is last mentioned in 893, under the name ʿAbdasi, in the list of Eliya of Damascus, as a diocese in the province of the patriarch. It is not known when or why the diocese was transferred from the province of Maishan. The last-known bishop of Karka d'Maishan, Abraham, was present at the synod held by the patriarch Yohannan IV shortly after his election in 900, and an unnamed bishop of Rima attended the consecration of Eliya I in Baghdad in 1028.

The bishop Yohannan of Maishan was one of several Persian bishops who opposed the claim to precedence put forward by the bishop Papa of Seleucia-Ctesiphon in 315.

The bishops Milis and Zabda of Prath d'Maishan were among the signatories of the acts of the synod of Isaac in 410, and Zabda was confirmed as metropolitan of Maishan in Canon XXI of the synod. He was among the signatories of the acts of the synod of Dadishoʿ in 424.

The bishop 'Nanaï' (or 'Hai'), 'bishop, metropolitan of Prath d'Maishan', was among the signatories of the acts of the synod of Acacius in 486.

The bishops Akaï (or Abaï) and Maraï, both styled 'bishop of Prath, metropolitan of Maishan', were among the signatories of the acts of the synod of Babaï in 497.

The bishop Taïmaï, son of Dadishoʿ, of Prath d'Maishan was consecrated metropolitan of Maishan during the patriarchal schism between Narsaï and Elishaʿ in the 520s and 530s. He was deposed and excommunicated by the patriarch Mar Aba I in 540 'as a bad worker in the church of God, on account of the divisions and dissensions he had stirred up, the oaths he had violated, and the anathema which he had delivered against him'. He was replaced by the bishop Yohannan, 'metropolitan of Wahman-Ardashir and of all Maishan', who was among the signatories of the acts of the synod of Mar Aba I in 544.

The bishop Shemʿon, 'bishop, metropolitan of Prath d'Maishan', was among the signatories of the acts of the synods of Ezekiel in 576 and Ishoʿyahb I in 585.

The bishop Joseph, 'bishop of Prath, metropolitan of Maishan', was among the signatories of the acts of the synod of Gregory in 605.

The anti-patriarch Surin was briefly appointed metropolitan of Maishan after his deposition in 753.

The metropolitan Sargis of Maishan was among the signatories of the acts of the synod of Timothy I in 790.

The metropolitan Shuhalmaran died three months after the consecration of Patriarch Abraham II in 837.

The metropolitan Daniel participated in the consecration of Patriarch Theodosius in 853.

The metropolitan Isho'dnah, who wrote the Book of Chastity and a lost three-volume history, probably reigned in the 860s and 870s, but possibly earlier around 850.

The metropolitan in 884 and 893 was Gabriel, who compiled the first Syriac nomocanon.

The metropolitan ʿAbd al-Masih of Basra was one of three metropolitans who were present at the consecration of the patriarch Israel in 961. He died in 986, two months before the death of the patriarch ʿAbdishoʿ I (968–86), and the diocese of Basra was still vacant at the time of ʿAbdishoʿ's death.

The bishop Joseph of (al-Hira) was appointed metropolitan of Maishan during the reign of the patriarch Mari (987–1000).

The bishop Abraham of Shahrzur was appointed metropolitan of Maishan during the reign of the patriarch Mari (987–99), after the death of the metropolitan Joseph.

An unnamed metropolitan 'of Basra' was present at the consecration of the patriarch Eliya I in 1028.

The monk Giwargis was consecrated metropolitan 'of Basra' by the patriarch Sabrishoʿ III shortly after his consecration in 1063/4. He was present as 'metropolitan of Basra and Prath Maishan' at the consecration of the patriarch ʿAbdishoʿ II (1074–90) in 1074. He died at an unknown date during the reign of the same patriarch, and was buried in the church of Suq al-Thalatha in Baghdad.

The metropolitan Shlemun of Maishan, a noted East Syriac writer and author of the Book of the Bee (translated into English and edited by E. A. Wallis Budge in 1886), was present at the consecration of the patriarch Sabrishoʿ IV in 1222.

== The diocese of Karka d'Maishan ==
The bishop 'Maraï' of Karka d'Maishan was confirmed as a suffragan bishop of the metropolitan of Maishan in Canon XXI of the synod of Isaac in 410, and was among the signatories of its acts.

The bishop Narsaï of Karka d'Maishan, probably the same man, was among the signatories of the acts of the synod of Dadishoʿ in 424.

The bishop Isaac of Karka d'Maishan was among the signatories of the acts of the synod of Acacius in 486.

The bishop 'Shilai' of 'Kashkar d'Maishan' was among the signatories of the acts of the synod of Aba I in 544.

The bishop Gabriel of Karka d'Maishan adhered by letter to the acts of the synod of Ishoʿyahb I in 585, and was among the signatories of the acts of the synod of Gregory in 605.

The bishop Shemʿon of Karka d'Maishan was deposed by the patriarch Timothy I between 799 and 804.

The bishop Abraham 'of Maishan' was present with a number of bishops from the province of the patriarch at the consecration of the patriarch Yohannan IV in 900. His diocese is probably to be identified with Karka d'Maishan, perhaps by then transferred to the province of the patriarch.

== The diocese of Rima ==
The bishop Andrew of Deir Mihraq (Rima) was one of several Persian bishops who opposed the claim to precedence put forward by the bishop Papa of Seleucia-Ctesiphon in 315.

The bishops Abaï and Abraham of Rima were among the signatories of the acts of the synod of Isaac in 410, and Abraham was confirmed as a suffragan bishop of the metropolitan of Maishan in Canon XXI of the synod.

The deacon and secretary Narsaï was among the signatories of the acts of the synod of Acacius in 486, on behalf of the bishop Bagesh of Rima.

The bishop Maraï of Rima was among the signatories of the acts of the synod of Babaï in 497.

The bishop Abraham of Rima was among the bishops who rallied to the patriarch Aba I in 540 and signed his Pragmatic. He was also among the signatories of the acts of the synod of Aba I in 544.

The bishop Sargis of 'Beth Rima' adhered by letter to the acts of the synod of Joseph in 554.

The bishop Melchisedec of Rima adhered by letter to the acts of the synod of Ishoʿyahb I in 585.

The bishop Yohannan of Rima was among the signatories of the acts of the synod of Gregory in 605.

An unperfected bishop of 'Nahr al-Dayr' (Rima), whose name is not mentioned, accompanied the metropolitan of Maishan to the consecration of the patriarch Eliya I in 1028, and was perfected by the patriarch immediately after his consecration.

== The diocese of Nahargur ==
The bishops ʿAbdishoʿ and Yohannan of Nahargur were among the signatories of the acts of the synod of Isaac in 410, and Yohannan was confirmed as a suffragan bishop of the metropolitan of Maishan in Canon XXI of the synod. He was also among the signatories of the acts of the synod of Dadishoʿ in 424.

The priest and secretary Joseph was among the signatories of the acts of the synod of Acacius in 486, on behalf of the bishop Eliya of Nahargur.

The bishop Mushe of Nahargur was among the signatories of the acts of the synod of Babaï in 497.

The bishop Mushe of Nahargur adhered by letter to the acts of the synod of Ishoʿyahb I in 585.

The bishop Gabriel of Nahargur was among the signatories of the acts of the synod of Gregory in 605.

== Topographical survey ==
There were several important areas of Christian settlement in Maishan, notably the cities of Basra and Ubullah. The Nestorian monastery of Mar Yohannan of Dailam in Ubullah, reputedly founded by the legendary apostle Mari, was still functioning as late as the twelfth century.
