= Isho =

- Pronunciation: English: /ˈi.ʃoʊ/; Classical Syriac: [ʔiːˈʃoːʕ] (Madnḥāyā), Classical Syriac pronunciation: [jəˈʃuʕ] (Serṭō), Assyrian Neo-Aramaic: [ˈʔi.ʃoʕ], Turoyo: [jeˈʃuʕ]
- Gender: Masculine

Origin
- Origin: Classical Syriac: ܝܫܘܥ (Ishoʿ)

Unvocalized Syriac form of the name of Jesus

Isho (Syriac: ܝܼܫܘܿܥ or ܐܝܼܫܘܿܥ īšōʕ), a cognate of the Hebrew term Yeshua, is the Eastern Syriac (Madnḥāyā) pronunciation of the Aramaic form of the name of Jesus. The name is borrowed from Classical Syriac (contrasting with the Western Serṭō form Yešūʿ) and is a male given name.

It is still commonly used as a name for Jesus among Syriac Christians (namely Assyrians) of West Asia and Saint Thomas Christians of India. Other variations of the name in spelling or pronunciation include Esho and Eeshoa. In the West and East Syriac Rites, the name is pronounced with the ‘Ayin (ʿ / ˤ / ʕ). However, a historical phonological shift whereby guttural phonemes weakened, including the ʿayn, whose lenition widely led to its gradual loss in spoken language, furthermore affecting the pronunciation of the name. In certain Eastern Aramaic varieties forms with an initial ʿayn (or its reflex) and an apocopated final ʿayn are attested, such as Classical Mandaic, where the name for Jesus is rendered ʿ-š-u (ࡏࡔࡅ ʿĪšū or ʿĒšu), though the ʿayin is pronounced like a regular long ī or ē.

The Arabic form ʿĪsā (عيسى), used as the name for Jesus in the Quran, is also widely considered by scholars to derive from the East Syriac version.

Persons with this name include:

- Ishoʿ of Merv
- Isho bar Ali
- Isho Bar Nun
- Isho Majid Hadaya

Names with Ishoʿ as a component include:

- Enanisho
- Hnanisho I
- Hnanisho II
- Ishoʿbokht
- Ishodad of Merv
- Isho'dnah
- Ishoʿsabran
- Ishoyahb I
- Ishoyahb II
- Ishoyahb III
- Ishoyahb IV
- Ishoyahb V
- Sabrisho I
- Sabrisho II
- Sabrisho III
- Sabrisho IV
- Sabrisho V

== See also ==
- Jesus (name)
- Abdisho
- Odisho
