= Fast of Nineveh =

Fast in Eastern Christianity

Fast of the Ninevites ܒܥܘܬܐ ܕܢܝܢܘܝ̈ܐ
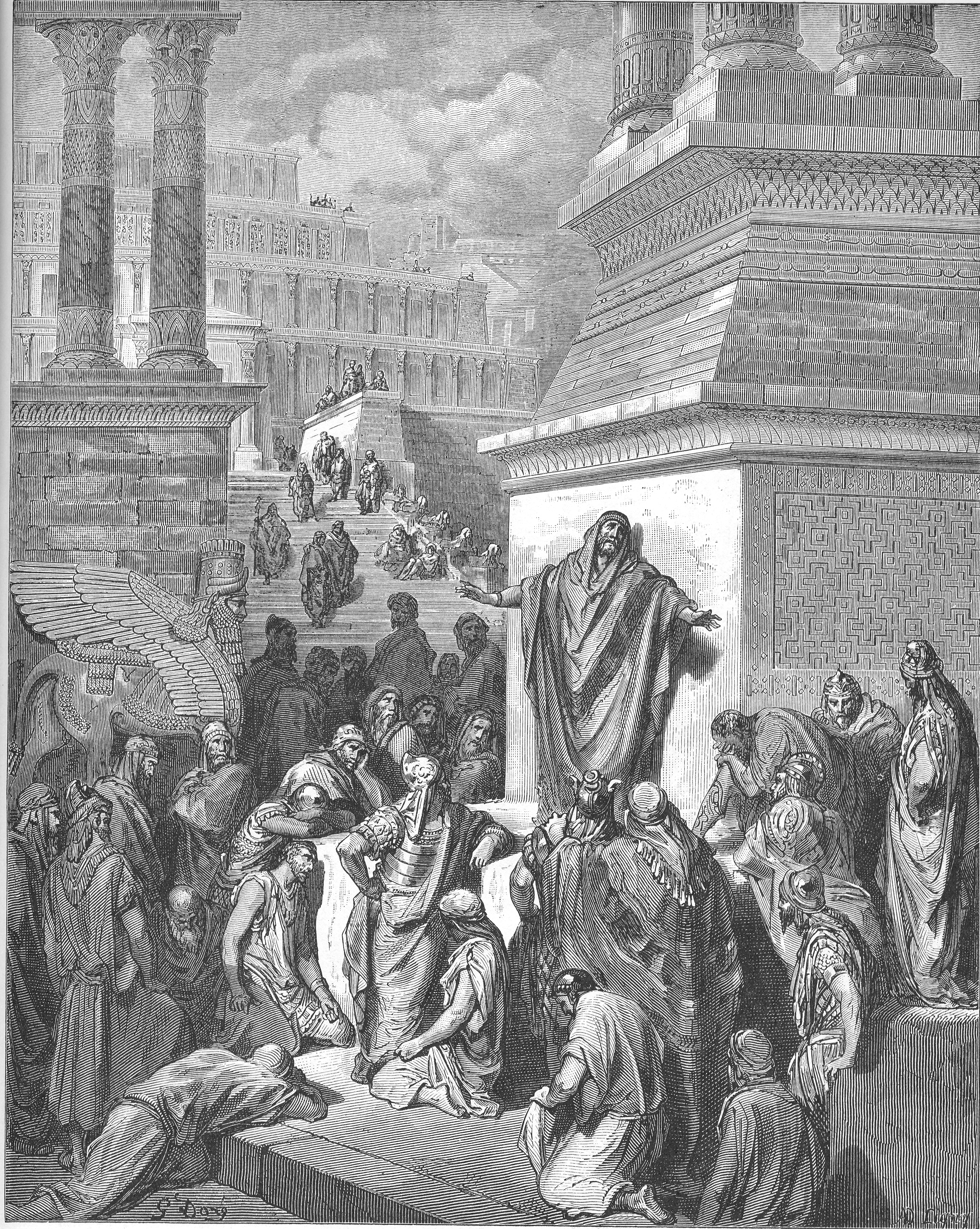
- Jonah preaches to the Ninevites
- Official name: ܒܥܘܬܐ ܕܢܝܢܘܝܐ
- Observed by: Three-day fast: All denominations of Syriac Christianity which use either the West Syriac Rite or the East Syriac Rite: Malankara Orthodox Syrian Church; Jacobite Syriac Orthodox Church; Assyrian Church of the East; Ancient Church of the East; Syro-Malabar Church; Chaldean Catholic Church; Syriac Maronite Church of Antioch; Malabar Independent Syrian Church; Syro-Malankara Catholic Church; Mar Thoma Syrian Church; Syriac Orthodox Church; Syriac Catholic Church; All Christian denominations which use the Alexandrian rites: Coptic Orthodox Church; Coptic Catholic Church; Ethiopian Orthodox Church; Eritrean Orthodox Church; Ethiopian Catholic Church; Eritrean Catholic Church; Five-day very distinctive Armenian version of the fast of the Catechumens: Armenian Apostolic Church; Armenian Catholic Church
- Type: Christian
- Begins: Monday of the third week before Lent
- Ends: Thursday of the third week before Lent (i.e. feast day)
- 2026 date: 26–28 January
- Duration: 3 days (or 5 days in the Armenian Church)
- Frequency: Annual
- Related to: Great Lent

In the Oriental Orthodox Churches, the Assyrian Church of the East, the Ancient Church of the East, and in some certain Eastern Catholic Churches of the West Syriac Rite, the East Syriac Rite, the Alexandrian Rites (both Coptic and Ge'ez), and the Armenian Rite, the Fast of Nineveh (Classical Syriac: ܒܥܘܬܐ ܕܢܝܢܘܝ̈ܐ Bā'ūṯā ḏ-Ninwāyē, literally "Petition of the Ninevites"; Armenian: Արաջավորաց Բահկ; Arajavorats Bahk; literally "Fast of the Catechumens"), is a three-day fast (or a five-day fast in the Armenian Church) starting the third Monday before Clean Monday from Sunday evening after sun set to Wednesday noon (or, until Friday, in the Armenian Church), during which participants usually abstain from all dairy foods and meat products. However, some faithful, traditionally observe the fast more rigorously and abstain from food and drink altogether from Sunday midnight to Wednesday after the Divine Liturgy, which is celebrated before the afternoon. However, the Armenian Apostolic Church and the Armenian Catholic Church both have and observe a very distinct version of the fast, which they call the Arajavorats Bahk (the Fast of the Catechumens), which instead lasts for 5 consecutive days (from Monday to Friday) in mid-January (in contrast to the three day fast observed in all other Eastern churches who observe the fast), and which ends just before the Armenian Feast of St. Sarkis. In addition, the very distinctive Armenian version of the fast is also generally more rigorous as it generally involves complete abstinence from the consumption of all types of animal products during their five-day fast.

The three day fast of Nineveh commemorates the three days that Prophet Jonah spent inside the belly of the Great Fish and the subsequent repentance with fasting from food and water performed by the Ninevites at the warning message of the prophet Jonah (cf. Jonah 3).

== Biblical basis ==
The Prophet Jonah appears in 2 Kings aka 4 Kings, and is thus thought to have been active around 786–746 BC. The text of Jonah 3 holds that after the prophet warned the people of Nineveh for the second time, they repented by fasting from food and water, along with wearing ashes and sackcloth. For this reason, the passage relates how God spared the Ninevites.

According to John Boardman, a possible scenario which facilitated the Ninevites’ acceptance of Jonah's preaching is the reign of Ashur-dan III of the Neo-Assyrian Empire having an outbreak of plague in 765 BC, a revolt from 763-759 BC, and another plague epidemic right after. These documented events suggest Jonah's words were given credibility and adhered to, with everyone including animals and children fasting from food and water.

== History ==
=== Assyrian Church of the East ===
As the patriarch Joseph (552–556/567 AD) (Classical Syriac: ܝܘܣܦ) had been deposed, Ezekiel (Classical Syriac: ܚܙܩܝܐܝܠ) was selected to replace him in the Church of the East, much to the joy of the emperor Khusrow Anushirwan who loved him and held him in high esteem. A mighty plague devastated Assyria and Southern Mesopotamia with the Sassanian authorities unable to curb its spread and the dead littered the streets, in particular the imperial capital Seleucia-Ctesiphon (Classical Syriac: ܣܠܝܩ ܩܛܝܣܦܘܢ) The metropolitans of the East Syriac ecclesiastical provinces of Adiabene (Classical Syriac: ܚܕܝܐܒ "Ḥdāyaḇ", encompassing the Assyrian cities of Arbela (Erbil), Nineveh, Assur, Hakkari and Adhorbayjan) and Beth Garmaï (Classical Syriac: ܒܝܬ ܓܪ̈ܡܝ "Bēṯ Garmai", encompassing Karka ( Kirkuk) and the surrounding region) called for services of prayer, fasting and penitence to be held in all the churches under their jurisdiction, as was believed to have been done by the Ninevites following the preaching of the prophet Jonah.

Following its success, the tradition has been strictly adhered to every year by the descendants of the Assyrian Church of the East, its offshoots the Chaldean Catholic Church and Ancient Church of the East, and Syriac Orthodox Church. Patriarchs of the Church of the East and Chaldean Catholic Church also called for extra fasts in an effort to alleviate the suffering and affliction of those persecuted by ISIS in the region of Nineveh and the rest of the Middle East.

=== Other Churches ===
Although the fast of the Ninevites was originally observed in the Assyrian Church of the East, Marutha of Tikrit is known to have imposed the Fast of Nineveh in the West Syriac Church, and served as Maphrian of the Syriac Orthodox Maphrianate of the East until his death on 2 May 649.

In the days of Pope Abraham of Alexandria (who was ethnically Syrian), the Coptic Orthodox Church adopted the fast, from which it spread to the Ethiopian and Eritrean Orthodox Churches, all of which still retain its observance.

In contrast, the Armenian Apostolic Church had adopted the fast from Saint Gregory the Illuminator (who was the founder and the first official head of the Armenian Church), which they still observe, although both they and the Armenian Catholic Church have a very distinct version of the fast, as they instead call their fast the Arajavorats Bahk (Fast of the Catechumens), and their fast is more rigorous (as it involves complete abstinence from the consumption of all types of animal products) and is also longer and lasts instead for 5 consecutive days (that is, from Monday to Friday) in mid-January, which ends just before the Armenian Feast of St. Sarkis (which lasts for over one month); and which is in complete contrast to the 3 days fast observed in all of the other Eastern churches who observe the fast.
