= Ain Sifni =

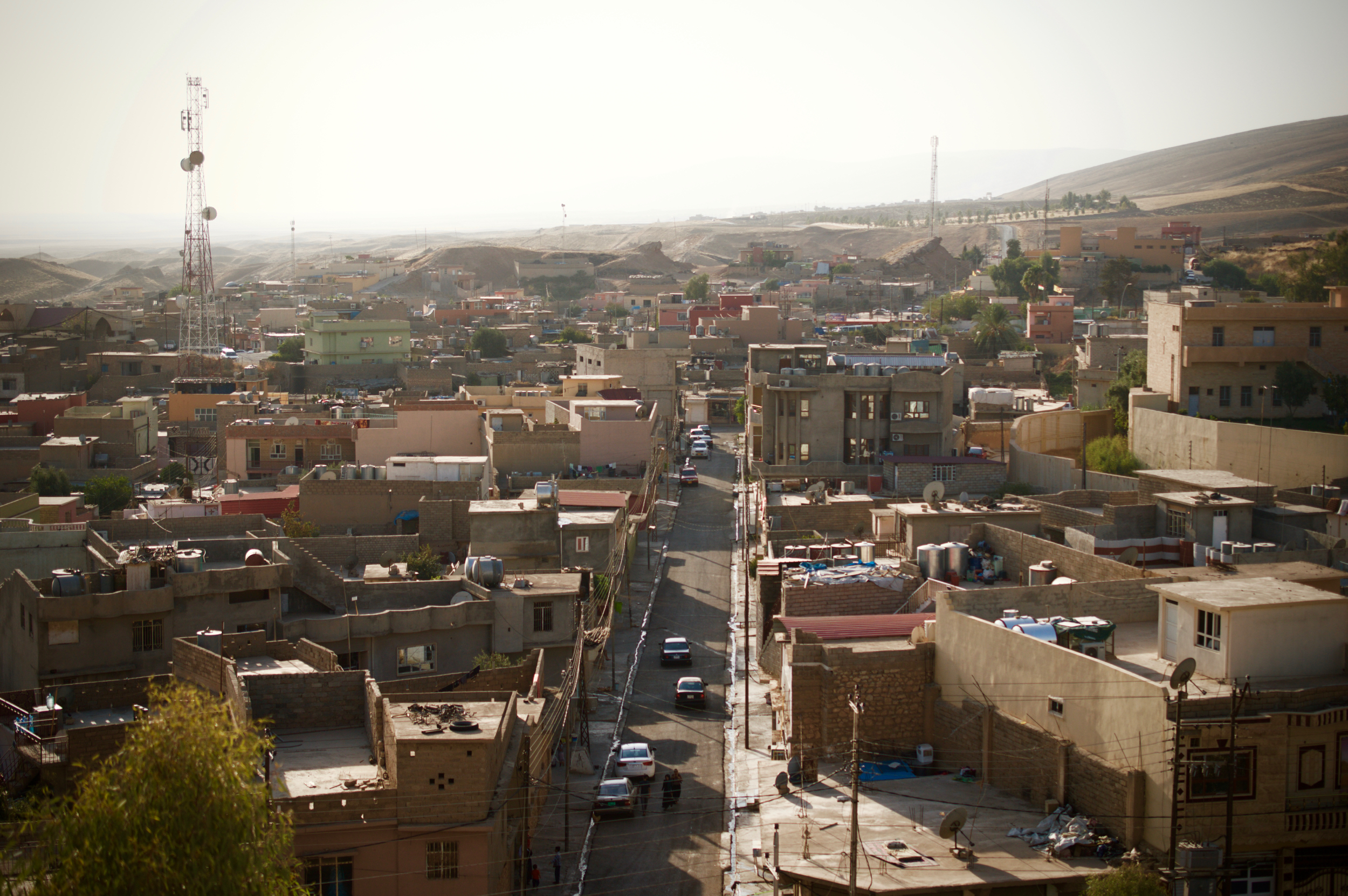

- Location in Iraq Ain Sifni (Iraqi Kurdistan)
- Coordinates: 36°41′30″N 43°21′00″E
- Country: Iraq
- Region: Kurdistan Region (de facto)
- Governorate: Nineveh Governorate (de jure); Dohuk Governorate (de facto)
- District: Shekhan District
- Sub-district: Ain Sifni

Population (2014)
  - Urban: 17,766
  - Rural: 6,355

Ain Sifni (Arabic: عين سفني, Kurdish: ئێسفنێ, romanized: Êsivnê, Syriac: ܥܝܢ ܣܦܢ̈ܐ, romanized: ʿAïn Sappāné) (Note: Alternatively transliterated as ʿAyn Sifni, Ainsefni, Ean Sefne, ʿAïn Sifni, or Ain Siphni.) also known as Shekhan (Kurdish: شێخان, romanized: Şêxan), (Note: Alternatively transliterated as Sheikhan, or Shekhan.) is a town and subdistrict in the Shekhan District of the Nineveh Plains, within the Nineveh Governorate of northern Iraq. Ain Sifni is largely populated by Yazidis, most of whom speak Kurmanji Kurdish.

In the town, there is a Chaldean Catholic church of Mar Yousif, and a church of Mar Gewargis of the Ancient Church of the East. There are also seven Yazidi religious monuments, including mausoleums of Sheikh ‘Alî Chamse and Sheikh Hantuch, and shrines of Sheikh Adi, Nishingaha Peroz, and Sheikh Mushelleh.

== Etymology ==
The Kurdish name of the town is derived from the plural form of "sheikh" ("holy man" in Kurdish), and thus translates to "[the land of the] holy men". According to Yazidi tradition, Shekhan means "two sheikhs", in reference to the place that Abdulqadir Gilani and Sheikh Adi ibn Musafir met, where the Yazidi town of Shekhan, which was formerly the centre of the Yazidi principality, is located. The Arabic name, Ain Sifni, is interpreted to stem from Ain as-Safīna (عين السفينة), referring to the Yazidi tradition that the town was the location of the construction of Noah's Ark.

== History ==
According to Yazidi tradition, Ain Sifni was the residence of Noah and location of the construction of Noah's Ark. Ain Sifni is attested as a diocese of the Church of the East in 576 AD, in which year its bishop Bar Sahde attended the synod of Catholicos Ezekiel of Seleucia-Ctesiphon. The town served as the centre of the subdistrict of Bēth Rustāqa which, as a consequence of the spread of the Syriac Orthodox Church in the district of Bēth Nūhadrā in the late sixth and early seventh centuries, was transferred to the district of Marghā in the late eighth century.

It is suggested that the mausoleum of the Yazidi saint Sheikh ‘Alî Chamse was constructed in the 15th century. The district of Ain Sifni was founded on 16 December 1924. Assyrians of the Baz clan of Hakkari settled at Ain Sifni after the Assyrian genocide in the First World War, and were attacked by the Iraqi army during the Simele massacre in 1933. Until the arrival of the Christian Assyrians, Ain Sifni was populated only by Yazidis and Jews. The Chaldean Catholic Church of Mar Yousif was rebuilt in 1960, replacing an older church built in 1946-1948. By 1961, 180 Chaldean Catholics inhabited the town.

The Yazidi population of Ain Sifni was forcibly relocated to Mahad in 1975 by the Iraqi government as part of its policy of Arabisation, and the town was resettled by Arabs. During the 2003 invasion of Iraq, two Iraqi military installations near Ain Sifni were struck by US airstrikes on 24 March. Two battalions of the Iraqi 108th Regiment, 8th Infantry Division, were stationed at the town at this time. The US bombing campaign against the garrison was ineffective, and an entire Iraqi battalion withdrew with no casualties. On 6 April, ODAs 051, 055, and 056 of the US 10th Special Forces Group and 300 Peshmerga soldiers of the 12th Supay (battalion) seized the town, and 33 Iraqis were killed, 54 wounded, and 230 taken prisoner, and 1 Peshmerga casualty.

In the aftermath of the fall of President Saddam Hussein in 2003, the Arab settlers fled Ain Sifni, allowing its former Yazidi population to return. In January 2005, it was reported that the Kurdistan Democratic Party blocked the delivery of ballot boxes to Ain Sifni, thereby ensuring its population was unable to vote in the Iraqi parliamentary election. The Kurdistan Regional Government (KRG) signed a production sharing contract with Hunt Oil Company to extract oil near Ain Sifni in September 2007, despite the town being officially outside the control of the KRG, and has since been declared illegal by the Iraqi government. The concession at Ain Sifni is estimated to have reservoirs of 900 million recoverable barrels of oil.

A priest house and community hall for local Christians was constructed by the Supreme Committee of Christian Affairs by December 2012. The town had an estimated population of 11,498 in 2013. Most of the town's population of 16,000 people fled during the Islamic State (IS) offensive in August 2014, and under 500 men remained to defend Ain Sifni under the leadership of mayor Mamo al-Bagsri. Prior to the IS offensive, Ain Sifni was inhabited by 700 families, of which 80% were Yazidi, 10% were Christian, and 10% were Muslim. Humanitarian aid was delivered to Ain Sifni by the Assyrian Aid Society in November 2014. In October 2017, 560 Assyrians with 140 families inhabited Ain Sifni.

By June 2018, the population had dropped to 200 families. In November 2018, the refugee camp at Ain Sifni, which is inhabited by Yazidi refugees, was flooded by heavy rainfall. The town was the residence of the Yazidi Emir Tahseen Said until he went into exile in Germany, where he died, and was buried at Ain Sifni on 5 February 2019.

== Geography ==
=== Climate ===
Ain Sifni has a Mediterranean climate (Köppen climate classification: Csa).

Climate data for Ain Sifni
Month	Jan	Feb	Mar	Apr	May	Jun	Jul	Aug	Sep	Oct	Nov	Dec	Year
Mean daily maximum °C (°F)	10.8 (51.4)	12.7 (54.9)	16.6 (61.9)	22.3 (72.1)	29.8 (85.6)	36.7 (98.1)	40.9 (105.6)	40.7 (105.3)	36.4 (97.5)	28.7 (83.7)	19.8 (67.6)	12.7 (54.9)	25.7 (78.2)
Daily mean °C (°F)	5.9 (42.6)	7.5 (45.5)	10.9 (51.6)	15.9 (60.6)	22.3 (72.1)	28.0 (82.4)	32.1 (89.8)	31.6 (88.9)	27.2 (81.0)	20.5 (68.9)	13.6 (56.5)	7.7 (45.9)	18.6 (65.5)
Mean daily minimum °C (°F)	1.0 (33.8)	2.3 (36.1)	5.3 (41.5)	9.6 (49.3)	14.9 (58.8)	19.4 (66.9)	22.3 (72.1)	22.5 (72.5)	18.0 (64.4)	12.4 (54.3)	7.5 (45.5)	2.7 (36.9)	11.5 (52.7)
Average precipitation mm (inches)	126 (5.0)	149 (5.9)	138 (5.4)	97 (3.8)	35 (1.4)	0 (0)	0 (0)	0 (0)	1 (0.0)	18 (0.7)	74 (2.9)	110 (4.3)	748 (29.4)
Source: https://en.climate-data.org/location/934732/

== Gallery ==
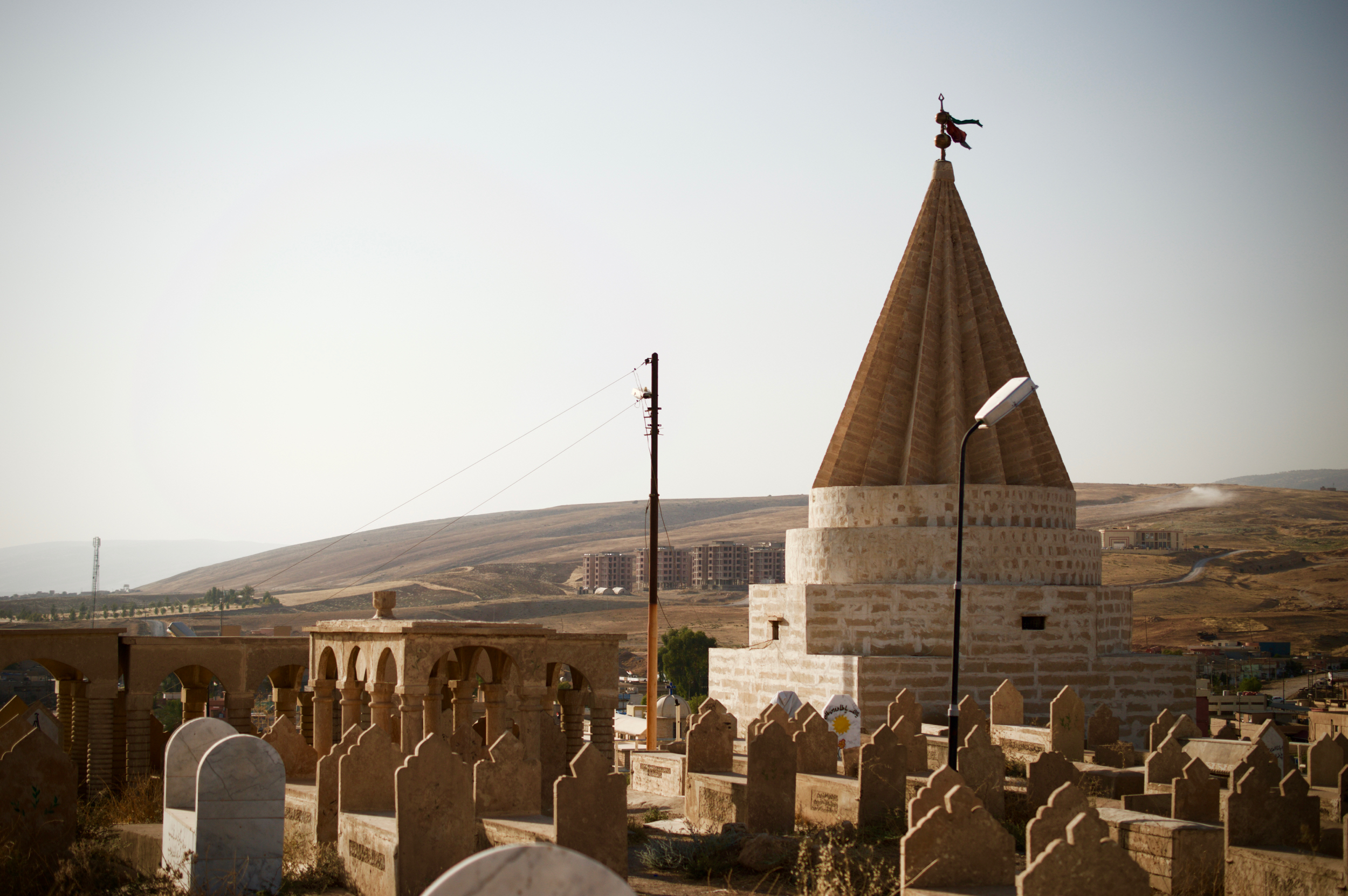
Yazidi cemetery in Ain Sifni

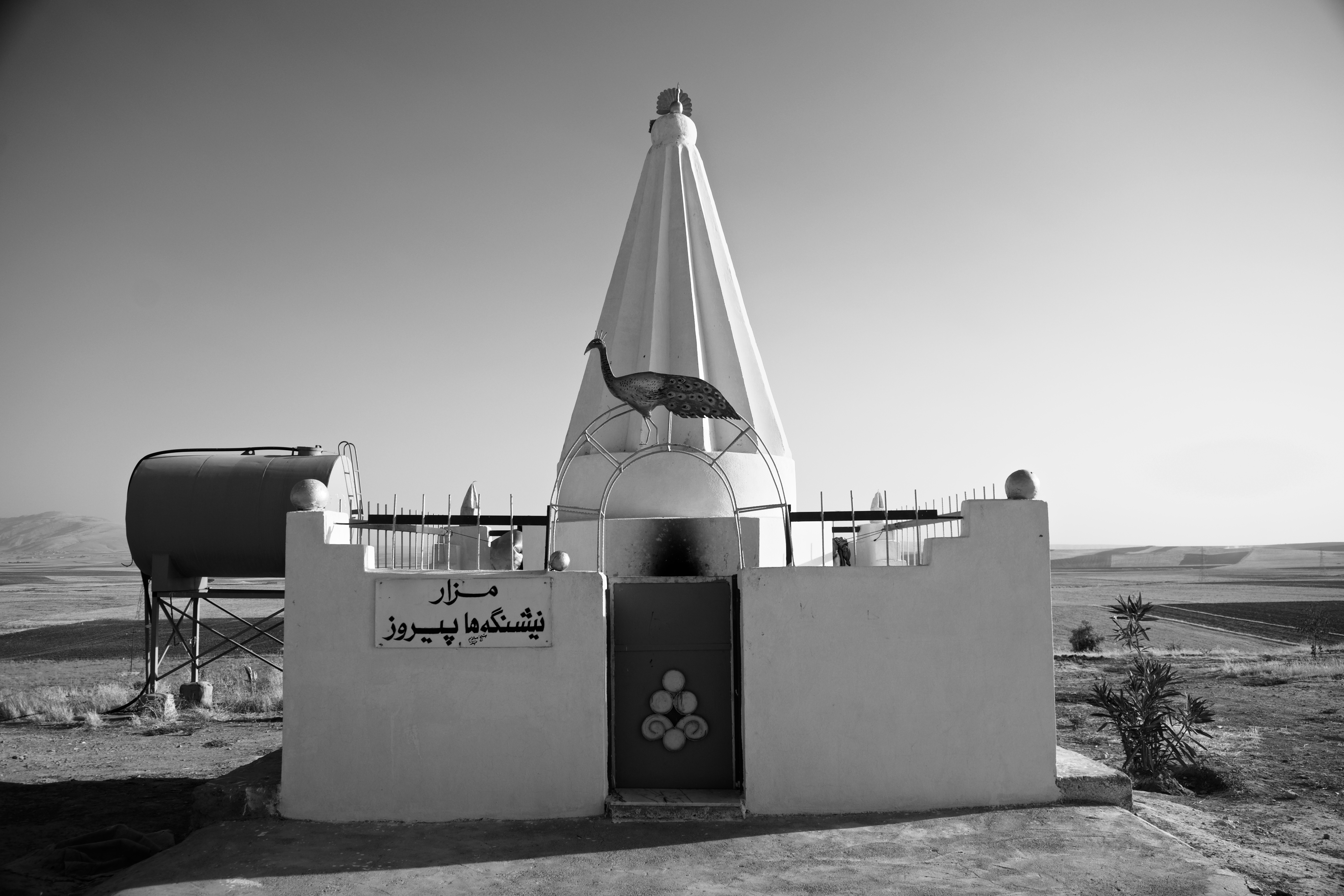
Yazidi shrine of Nishingaha Peroz near Ain Sifni

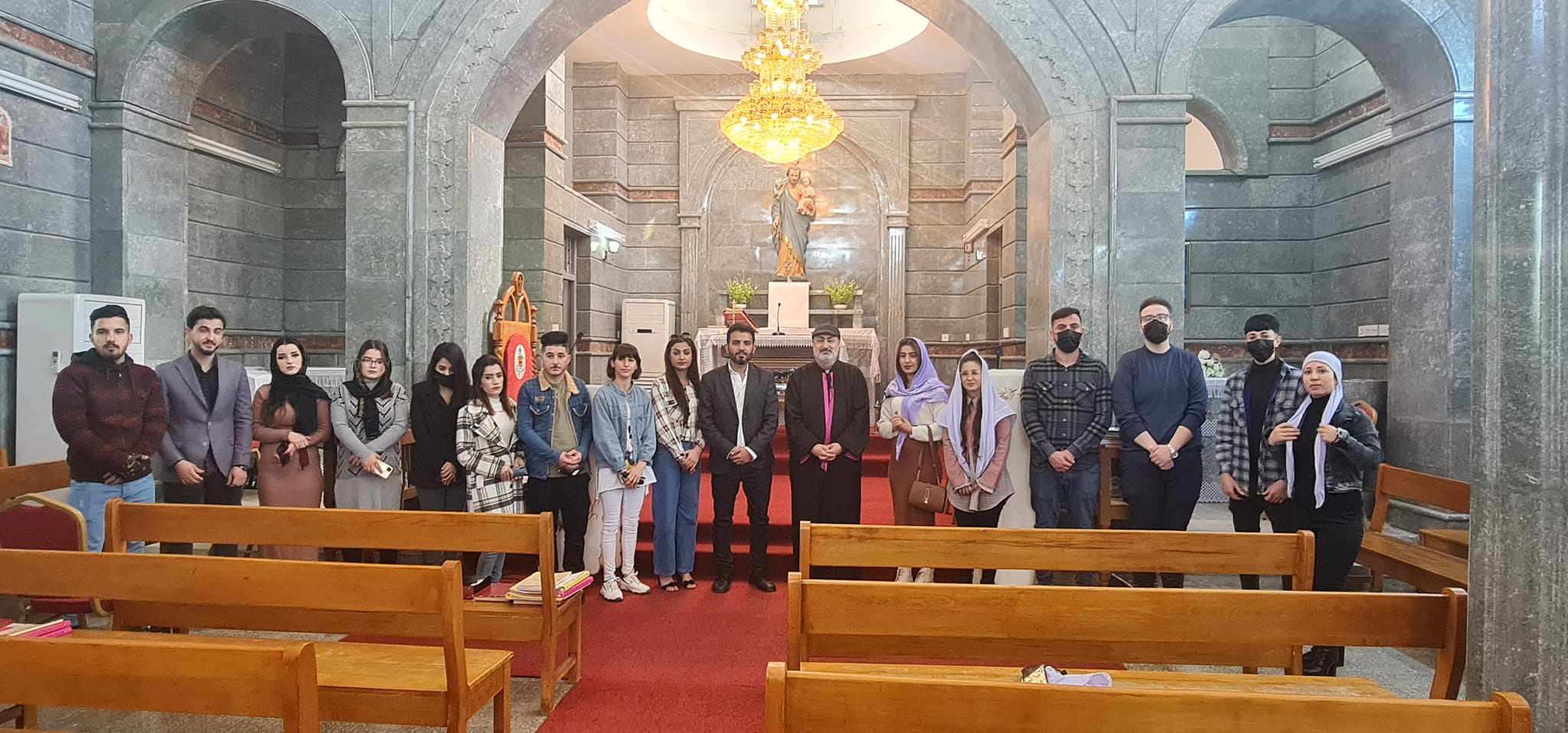
Chaldean Catholics from Ain Sifni

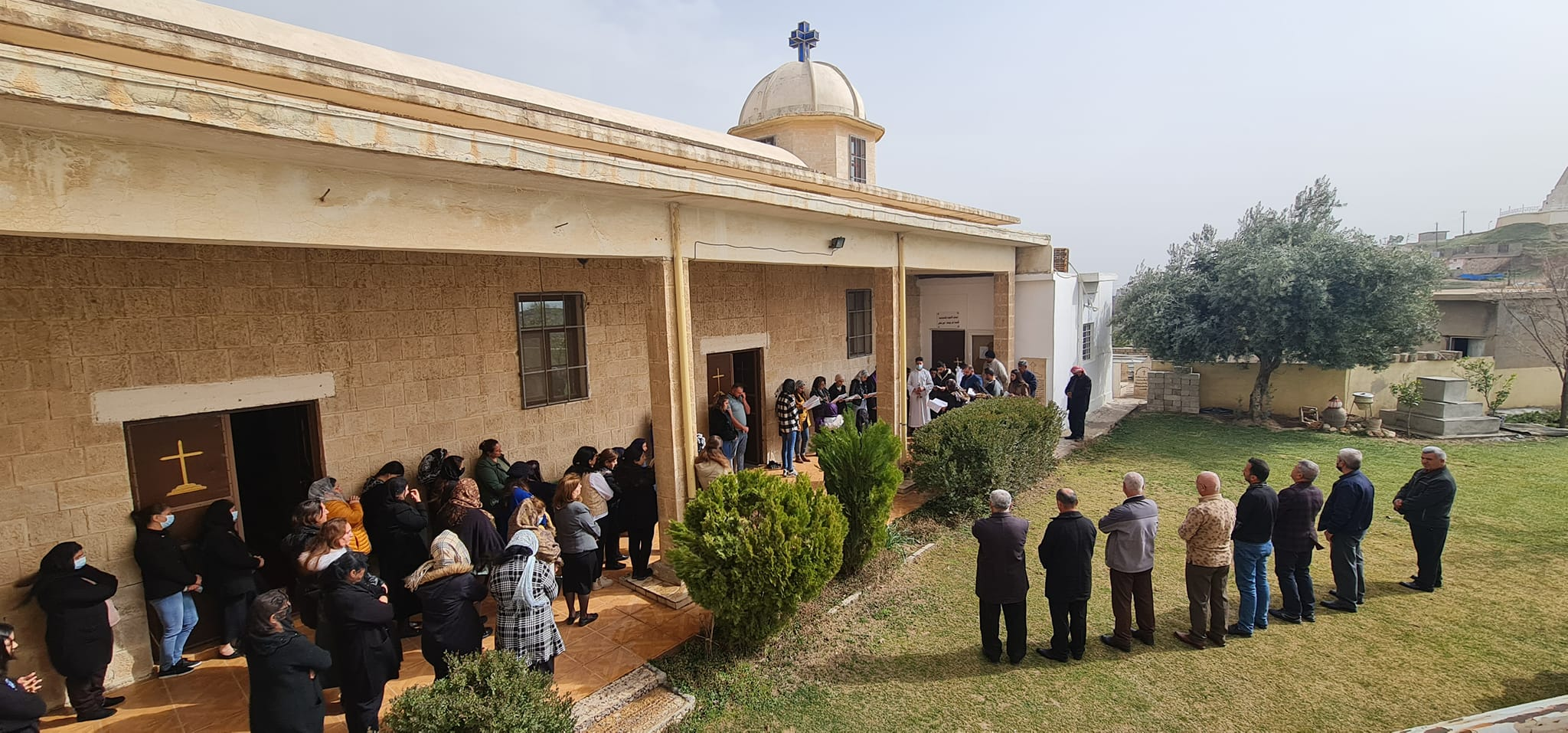
Chaldean Catholic Church of Saint Yousif in Ain Sifni

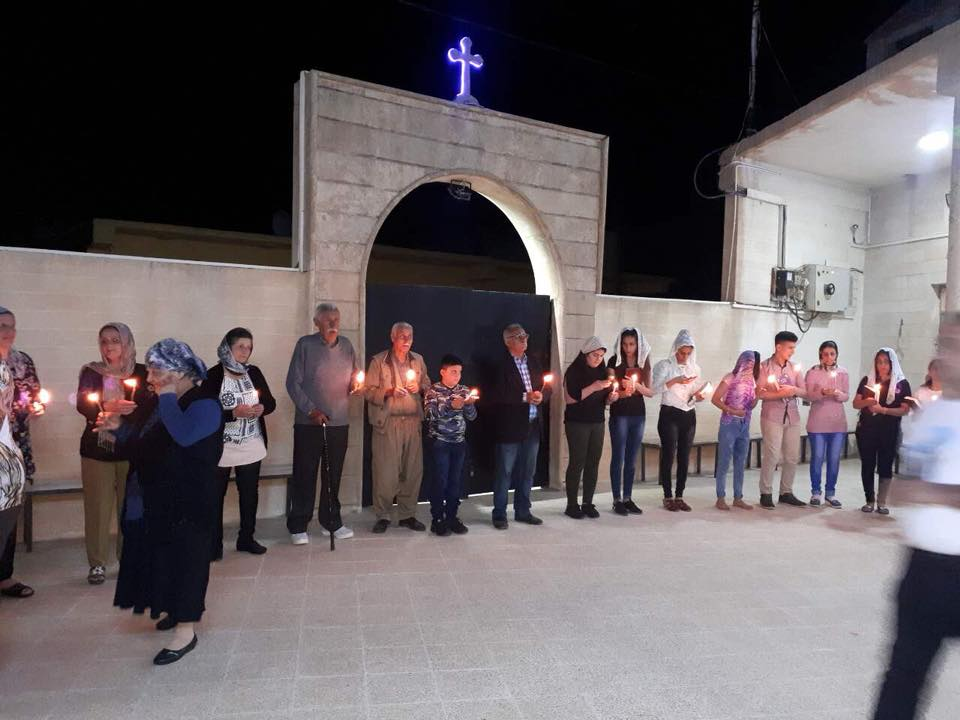
Ancient Church of the East Church of Mar Gewargis in Ain Sifni

== See also ==
- Assyrians in Iraq
- Yazidis in Iraq
- Yazidi settlements

== Bibliography ==
- Chabot, Jean-Baptiste (1902). Synodicon orientale ou recueil de synodes nestoriens (PDF) (in French). Paris: Imprimerie Nationale.
- Donabed, Sargon George (2015). Reforging a Forgotten History: Iraq and the Assyrians in the Twentieth Century. Edinburgh University Press.
- Fiey, Jean Maurice (1975). Assyrie Chrétienne (in French). Vol. 2. Imprimerie Catholique de Beyrouth.
- Finlayson, Kenneth (2005). "This is What You Signed Up For: The Attack on Ayn Sifni" (PDF). Veritas. 1 (1): 75–78.
- Kreyenbroek, Philip (1995). Yezidism: its background, observances, and textual tradition. Lewiston, New York: Edwin Mellen Press. ISBN 0-7734-9004-3. OCLC 31377794.
- Margoliouth, J. P. (2009). Supplement to the Thesaurus Syriacus of R. Payne Smith. Wipf and Stock Publishers.
- Morony, Michael (1982). "Continuity and Change in the Administrative Geography of Late Sasanian and Early Islamic al-'Irāq". Iran. 20. Taylor & Francis, Ltd.: 1–49. doi:10.2307/4299720. JSTOR 4299720.
- Pirbari, Dimitri; Mossaki, Nodar; Yezdin, Mirza Sileman (March 2020). "A Yezidi Manuscript:—Mišūr of P'īr Sīnī Bahrī/P'īr Sīnī Dārānī, Its Study and Critical Analysis". Iranian Studies. 53 (1–2): 223–257. doi:10.1080/00210862.2019.1669118. ISSN 0021-0862. S2CID 214483496.
- Wilmshurst, David (2000). The Ecclesiastical Organisation of the Church of the East, 1318–1913 (PDF). Peeters Publishers.
