= Rai (East Syriac ecclesiastical province) =

Metropolitan province of the Church of the East

The Metropolitanate of Rai was an East Syriac metropolitan province of the Church of the East, between the eighth and twelfth centuries. The province of Rai had a suffragan diocese for Gurgan.

== Background ==
In Tabaristan (northern Iran), the diocese of Rai (Beth Raziqaye) is first mentioned in 410, and seems to have had a fairly uninterrupted succession of bishops for the next six and a half centuries. Bishops of Rai are first attested in 424 and last mentioned towards the end of the eleventh century.

An East Syriac diocese was established in the Sassanian province of Gurgan (Hyrcania) to the southeast of the Caspian Sea in the fifth century for a community of Christians deported from Roman territory. The bishop Domitian 'of the deportation of Gurgan', evidently from his name a Roman, was present at the synod of Dadishoʿ in 424, and three other fifth- and sixth-century bishops of Gurgan attended the later synods, the last of whom, Zaʿura, was among the signatories of the acts of the synod of Ezekiel in 576. The bishops of Gurgan probably sat in the provincial capital Astarabad.

The diocese of Rai was raised to metropolitan status in 790 by the patriarch Timothy I. According to Eliya of Damascus, Gurgan was a suffragan diocese of the province of Rai in 893. It is doubtful whether either diocese still existed at the end of the thirteenth century. The last-known bishop of Rai, ʿAbd al-Masih, was present at the consecration of ʿAbdishoʿ II in 1075 as 'metropolitan of Hulwan and Rai', suggesting that the episcopal seat of the bishops of Rai had been transferred to Hulwan. According to the Mukhtasar of 1007/08, the diocese of 'Gurgan, Bilad al-Jibal and Dailam' had been suppressed, 'owing to the disappearance of Christianity in the region'.

== The Diocese of Rai ==
The bishop David of Rai was among the signatories of the acts of the synod of Dadishoʿ in 424.

The priest Abraham 'of the great church of Aksondnokre' was among the signatories of the acts of the synod of Acacius in 486, on behalf of the bishop Joseph of Rai.

The priest and secretary Ahaï was among the signatories of the acts of the synod of Babaï in 497, on behalf of the bishop Joseph of Rai.

The bishop Daniel 'of the Raziqaye' adhered by letter to the acts of the synod of Joseph in 554.

The bishop Ahron, 'metropolitan of the Raziqaye', was previously a disciple of Sabrishoʿ of Beth Qoqa, who died c.650.

The bishop Mark of Beth Bgash was appointed metropolitan of Rai by the patriarch Yohannan III immediately after his consecration on 15 July 893.

The metropolitan ʿAbd al-Masih of 'Hulwan and Rai' was present at the consecration of ʿAbdishoʿ II in 1075, and died at an unknown date during his reign.

== The Diocese of Gurgan ==
The bishop Domitian of 'the deportation of Gurgan' was among the signatories of the acts of the synod of Dadishoʿ in 424.

The bishop Abraham of Gurgan was among the signatories of the acts of the synod of Babaï in 497.

The bishop Peter of Gurgan was deposed by the patriarch Mar Aba I in 540.

The bishop Zaʿura of Gurgan was among the signatories of the acts of the synod of Ezekiel in 576.
