= Catholicos Gregory I =

Catholicos Gregory I may refer to:

- Gregory the Illuminator, a religious leader who is credited with converting Armenia from paganism to Christianity in 301
- Gregory (Nestorian patriarch), patriarch of the Church of the East from 605 to 609
