= Adiabene (East Syriac ecclesiastical province) =

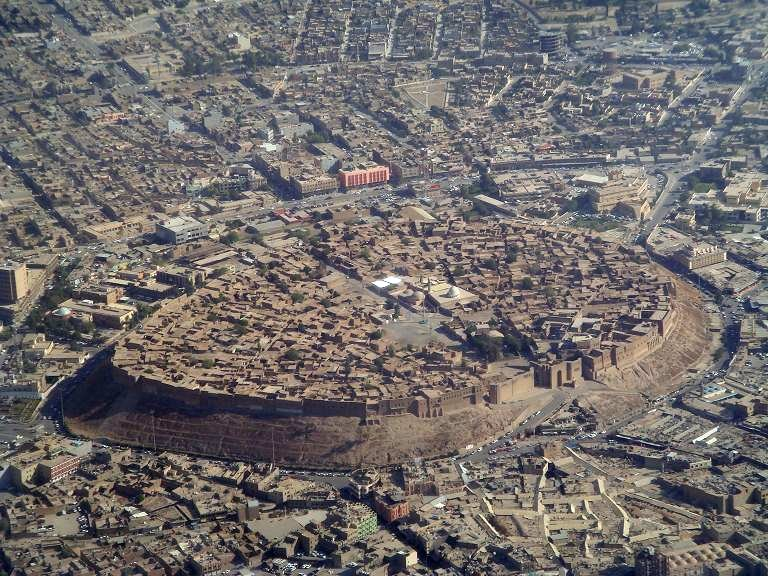
The citadel of Erbil, chief town in the East Syriac metropolitan province of Adiabene

Metropolitanate of Adiabene (Syriac: Hadyab ܚܕܝܐܒ) was an East Syriac metropolitan province of the Church of the East between the 5th and 14th centuries, with more than fifteen known suffragan dioceses at different periods in its history. Although the name Hadyab normally connoted the region around Erbil and Mosul in present-day Iraq, the boundaries of the East Syriac metropolitan province went well beyond the Erbil and Mosul districts. Its known suffragan dioceses included Beth Bgash (the Hakkari region of eastern Turkey) and Adarbaigan (the Ganzak district, to the southeast of Lake Urmi), well to the east of Adiabene proper.

== Ecclesiastical history ==
Adiabene and its environs

The bishop of Erbil, present-day Iraqi Kurdistan, became metropolitan of Adiabene in 410, responsible also for the six suffragan dioceses of Beth Nuhadra (ܒܝܬ ܢܘܗܕܪܐ), Beth Bgash, Beth Dasen, Ramonin, Beth Mahqart and Dabarin. Bishops of the dioceses of Beth Nuhadra, Beth Bgash and Beth Dasen, which covered the modern ʿAmadiya and Hakkari regions, were present at most of the early synods, and these three dioceses continued without interruption into the 13th century. The other three dioceses are not mentioned again, and have been tentatively identified with three dioceses better known under other names: Ramonin with Shenna d'Beth Ramman in Beth Aramaye, on the Tigris near its junction with the Great Zab; Beth Mahrqart with Beth Qardu in the Nisibis region, across the Tigris from the district of Beth Zabdaï; and Dabarin with Tirhan, a district of Beth Aramaye which lay between the Tigris and the Jabal Hamrin, to the southwest of Beth Garmaï.

By the middle of the 6th century, there were also dioceses in the province of Adiabene for Maʿaltha (ܡܥܠܬܐ) or Maʿalthaya (ܡܥܠܬܝܐ), a town in the Hnitha (ܚܢܝܬܐ) or Zibar district to the east of ʿAqra, and for Nineveh. The diocese of Maʿaltha is first mentioned in 497, and the diocese of Nineveh in 554, and bishops of both dioceses attended most of the later synods.

Erbil, the chief town of Adiabene, lost much of its former importance with the growth of the city of Mosul, and during the reign of the patriarch Timothy I (780–823) the seat of the metropolitans of Adiabene was moved to Mosul. The dioceses of Adiabene were governed by a 'metropolitan of Mosul and Erbil' for the next four and a half centuries. Around 1200, Mosul and Erbil became separate metropolitan provinces. The last known metropolitan of Mosul and Erbil was Tittos, who was appointed by Eliya III (1175–89). Thereafter separate metropolitan bishops for Mosul and for Erbil are recorded in a fairly complete series from 1210 to 1318.

Five new dioceses in the province of Mosul and Erbil were established during the Umayyad and ʿAbbasid periods: Marga, Salakh (ܣܠܟ), Haditha, Taimana and Hebton. The dioceses of Marga and Salakh, covering the districts around ʿAmadiya and ʿAqra, are first mentioned in the 8th century but may have been created earlier, perhaps in response to West Syriac competition in the Mosul region in the 7th century. The diocese of Marga persisted into the 14th century, but the diocese of Salakh is last mentioned in the 9th century. By the 8th century there was also an East Syriac diocese for the town of Hdatta (Haditha) on the Tigris, which persisted into the 14th century. The diocese of Taimana, which embraced the district south of the Tigris in the vicinity of Mosul and included the monastery of Mar Mikha'il, is attested between the eighth and 10th centuries, but does not seem to have persisted into the 13th century.

A number of East Syriac bishops are attested between the eighth and 13th centuries for the diocese of Hebton, a region of northwest Adiabene to the south of the Great Zab, adjacent to the district of Marga. It is not clear when the diocese was created, but it is first mentioned under the name 'Hnitha and Hebton' in 790. Hnitha was another name for the diocese of Maʿaltha, and the patriarch Timothy I is said to have united the dioceses of Hebton and Hnitha in order to punish the presumption of the bishop Rustam of Hnitha, who had opposed his election. The union was not permanent, and by the 11th century Hebton and Maʿaltha were again separate dioceses.

Bishops of Adarbaigan, a diocese centred on the town of Ganzak and bounded on the west by the Salmas and Urmi plains and on the east by the Caspian Sea, were present at most of the 5th-century synods, but Adarbaigan was not among the dioceses assigned to a metropolitan province in 410. By the 8th century it was part of the metropolitan province of Adiabene.

At the beginning of the 13th century, there were at least eight suffragan dioceses in the provinces of Mosul and Erbil: Haditha, Maʿaltha, Hebton, Beth Bgash, Dasen, Beth Nuhadra, Marga and Urmi. The diocese of Hebton is last mentioned in 1257, when its bishop Gabriel attended the consecration of the patriarch Makkikha II. The diocese of Dasen definitely persisted into the 14th century, as did the diocese of Marga, though it was renamed Tella and Barbelli in the second half of the 13th century. It is possible that the dioceses of Beth Nuhadra, Beth Bgash and Haditha also survived into the 14th century. Haditha, indeed, is mentioned as a diocese at the beginning of the 14th century by ʿAbdishoʿ of Nisibis. Urmi too, although none of its bishops are known, may also have persisted as a diocese into the 16th century, when it again appears as the seat of an East Syriac bishop. The diocese of Maʿaltha is last mentioned in 1281, but probably persisted into the 14th century under the name Hnitha. The bishop ʿAbdishoʿ 'of Hnitha', attested in 1310 and 1318, was almost certainly a bishop of the diocese formerly known as Maʿaltha.

== Dioceses in the Erbil region ==
=== The diocese of Erbil ===
According to the Chronicle of Erbil, a history of Christianity in Adiabene under the Parthians and Sassanians purportedly written by the 6th-century East Syriac author Mshiha-zkha, a diocese was established for Erbil at the beginning of the 2nd century. The Chronicle describes the careers of twenty bishops of Erbil between the second and 6th centuries and provides precise reign dates for each of them. According to the Chronicle, the early bishops of Erbil were Paqida (104–14), Samson (120–3), Isaac (135–48), Abraham (148–63), Nuh (168–79), Habel (183–90), ʿAbd-mshiha (190–225), Hiran (225–58), Shahlupha (258–73), Ahadabui (273–91), Sriʿa (291–317), Yohannan (317–46), Abraham (346–7), Maran-zkha (347–76), Shubhalishoʿ (376–407), Daniel (407–31), Rima (431–50), ʿAbbushta (450–99), Joseph (499–511) and Hnana (from 511).

The authenticity of the Chronicle of Erbil has been questioned, and scholars remain divided on how much credence to place in its evidence. Some of the bishops mentioned in the Chronicle of Erbil, particularly those from the 4th century onwards, are attested in other sources, but the early bishops are probably legendary.

The metropolitan Daniel of Adiabene was present at the synod of Isaac in 410 and subscribed to its acts. He was also among the signatories of the acts of the synod of Dadishoʿ in 424.

Towards the end of the 5th century Adiabene had two metropolitans. The bishop Joseph, 'bishop of Erbil, metropolitan of Adiabene', was among the signatories of the acts of the synod of Babai in 497, and the secretary Sidura signed the acts of the same synod on behalf of the bishop ʿAbbushta, 'metropolitan of Adiabene'.

The metropolitan Hnana of Adiabene was among the signatories of the acts of the synod of Aba I in 544.

The metropolitan Mshabbha of Adiabene was among the signatories of the acts of the synod of Joseph in 554.

The metropolitan Hnana of Adiabene was among the signatories of the acts of the synod of Ezekiel in 576. The priest and archdeacon Bar Aba was among the signatories of the acts of the synod of Ishoʿyahb I in 585, on behalf of the metropolitan Hnana, 'metropolitan of the Athoraye', probably the same man.

The metropolitan Yonadab of Adiabene was among the signatories of the acts of the synod of Gregory in 605.

The patriarch Ishoʿyahb III of Adiabene (649–59) was metropolitan of Adiabene from 637 to 649.

The metropolitan Yohannan of Adiabene flourished in the first half of the 8th century. The nephew of the celebrated East Syriac writers Hnanishoʿ and Ishoʿyahb of Beth ʿAbe, Yohannan was formerly a monk of the monastery of Beth ʿAbe, later its superior, and later still bishop of Beth Bgash. He was consecrated metropolitan of Adiabene by the patriarch Sliba-zkha (714–28), and died during the reign of the patriarch Mar Aba II (742–52).

The metropolitan Ahha of Adiabene flourished around the middle of the 8th century. Originally a monk of the monastery of Beth ʿAbe, he later became its superior. He was appointed metropolitan of Adiabene by the patriarch Aba II (742–52) on the death of the metropolitan Yohannan. During his metropolitanate he consecrated the bishops Sargis of Maʿaltha and Hnitha and Maranʿammeh of Salakh.

The metropolitan Maranʿammeh of Adiabene flourished during the third quarter of the 8th century. An ascetic from the town of Htara in the Tirhan district, he studied in his youth under Rabban Babai in Gbilta and later opened a school in the Erbil village of Kfar ʿUzail, where he taught for many years. In his late middle age, during the reign of the patriarch Aba II (742–52), he was consecrated bishop of Salakh by the metropolitan Ahha of Adiabene. He was appointed metropolitan of Adiabene by the patriarch Yaʿqob II (754–73) on Ahha's death. He died of sickness and extreme old age shortly after the accession of Timothy I in 780 in the village of Beth Rewai, and his body was buried in the village's church. Thomas of Marga devoted the entire third book of his Book of Governors to Maranʿammeh's life and work.

The metropolitan Ishoʿyahb of Adiabene was consecrated by the patriarch Timothy I shortly after his election in 780, on the death of the metropolitan Maranʿammeh. Ishoʿyahb, the elderly superior of the monastery of Beth ʿAbe, had originally intended to contest the 780 patriarchal election and was widely expected to win it. His rival Timothy, then bishop of Beth Bgash, persuaded him to withdraw his candidacy on the grounds of old age, and promised to appoint him metropolitan of Adiabene if he became patriarch himself.

Erbil, the chief town of Adiabene, lost much of its former importance with the growth of the city of Mosul, and during the reign of the patriarch Timothy I (780–823) the seat of the metropolitans of Adiabene was moved to Mosul. The dioceses of Adiabene were governed by a 'metropolitan of Mosul and Erbil' for the next four and a half centuries. Around 1200, Mosul and Erbil became separate metropolitan provinces. The last known metropolitan of Mosul and Erbil was Tittos, who was appointed by Eliya III (1175–89). Thereafter separate metropolitan bishops for Mosul and for Erbil are recorded in a fairly complete series from 1210 to 1318.

The metropolitan Sabrishoʿ Ibn Qayyoma 'of Hazza and Erbil' was present at the consecration of the patriarch Sabrishoʿ IV in 1222.

The metropolitan Denha of Erbil (the future patriarch Denha I, 1265–81), was present at the consecration of the patriarch Makkikha II in 1257.

The metropolitan Mushe of Erbil was present at the consecration of the patriarch Yahballaha III in 1281.

The metropolitan Joseph of Erbil became patriarch in 1318, taking the name Timothy II. According to ʿAbdishoʿ of Nisibis, he was originally metropolitan of Mosul, and was transferred to the diocese of Erbil upon the death of its metropolitan Abraham.

=== The diocese of Ramonin ===
The bishop ʿAqballaha of Ramonin was confirmed as a suffragan bishop of the metropolitan Daniel of Adiabene in Canon XXI of the synod of Isaac in 410.

=== The diocese of Dabarin ===
The bishop Nuh (Noah) of 'the fortress of Dabarin', was confirmed as a suffragan bishop of the metropolitan Daniel of Adiabene in Canon XXI of the synod of Isaac in 410.

=== The diocese of Maʿaltha and Hnitha ===
The bishop Yohannan of Maʿaltha was among the signatories of the acts of the synod of Babaï in 497.

The bishop Shemʿon of Maʿaltha was among the signatories of the acts of the synod of Mar Aba I in 544.

The bishop Yazdpanah of Maʿaltha was among the signatories of the acts of the synod of Joseph in 554.

The bishop Bar Shabtha of Maʿaltha was among the signatories of the acts of the synods of Ezekiel in 576 and Ishoʿyahb I in 585.

The bishop Klilishoʿ of Maʿaltha was among the signatories of the acts of the synod of Gregory in 605.

The bishop Dindowai of 'Maʿaltha and Hnitha', formerly a monk of the monastery of Beth ʿAbe, was appointed by the metropolitan Yohannan of Adiabene at an unknown date in the first half of the 8th century. After his death he was buried in the monastery of Beth ʿAbe.

The bishop Sargis of 'Maʿaltha and Hnitha', formerly a monk of the monastery of Beth ʿAbe, was appointed around the middle of the 8th century by the metropolitan Ahha of Adiabene after the death of Dindowai. Sargis abandoned his diocese in the wake of a raid on the Hnitha district by the Dailomaye and took refuge in the monastery of Beth ʿAbe, where he remained until his death. Like his predecessor, he was buried in the monastery. Thomas of Marga considered his flight from his diocese discreditable, and remarked that he had 'failed to live up to the hopes that had been placed in him'.

The bishop Yohannan Ibn Bokhtishoʿ of Maʿaltha was appointed metropolitan of Mosul by the patriarch Yohannan III immediately after his consecration on 15 July 893.

The bishop Yohannan of Maʿaltha ('in the province of Mosul') was present at the consecration of the patriarch ʿAbdishoʿ II in 1074.

The bishop Quriaqos of Maʿaltha was present at the consecration of the patriarch Makkikha I in 1092.

The bishop ʿAbdishoʿ of Maʿaltha was present at the consecration of the patriarch Denha I in 1265.

The bishop Giwargis 'of Maʿaltha' was present at the consecration of the patriarch Yahballaha III in 1281.

The bishop ʿAbdishoʿ of Hnitha was present at the consecration of the patriarch Timothy II in 1318.

=== The diocese of Hebton ===
The bishop David 'of Hnitha and Hebton' was among the bishops who witnessed a retraction of the Messallian heresy made by the priest Nestorius of the monastery of Mar Yozadaq in 790 before his consecration as bishop of Beth Nuhadra.

The monk Dnah-maran of the monastery of Beth Qoqa was consecrated bishop of Hebton at an unknown date in the first half of the 9th century.

An unperfected bishop of Hebton, whose name is not mentioned, accompanied the metropolitan of Mosul to the consecration of the patriarch Eliya I in 1028, and was perfected by the patriarch immediately after his consecration.

The bishop Mark of Hebton, 'in the province of Mosul', was present at the consecration of the patriarch ʿAbdishoʿ II (1074–90) in 1074, accompanied by a bishop of Maʿaltha. The metropolitan Yohannan of Damascus was deposed at an unknown date during the reign of the same patriarch, and Mark was appointed metropolitan of Damascus in his place.

The bishop Sabrishoʿ of Hebton was present at the consecration of the patriarch Makkikha I in 1092.

An unnamed and unperfected bishop of Hebton, 'in the province of Mosul', was present at the consecration of the patriarch ʿAbdishoʿ III in 1139.

The bishop Gabriel of Hebton was present at the consecration of the patriarch Makkikha II in 1257.

=== The diocese of Haditha ===
The bishop Shlemun of Hdatta was one of the bishops who opposed the election of the patriarch Timothy I in 780.

The patriarch Abraham of Marga (837–50) was originally an archimandrite in the monastery of Beth ʿAbe, and later bishop of Hdatta (Haditha).

The bishop Ishodad of Merv served as bishop of Hdatta sometime after Abraham until the 850s.

The bishop Ishoʿyahb of Haditha was appointed metropolitan of Mosul during the reign of the patriarch Mari (987–99).

An unnamed and unperfected bishop of Haditha was present at the consecration of the patriarch ʿAbdishoʿ II in 1074.

The bishop David of Haditha was consecrated metropolitan of Beth Garmaï during the reign of the patriarch ʿAbdishoʿ II (1074–90).

The bishop ʿAbdishoʿ of Haditha was present at the consecration of the patriarch Makkikha I in 1092.

=== The diocese of al-Bariya ===
An unnamed bishop of 'al-Bariya', a diocese not otherwise attested, accompanied the metropolitan of Mosul to the consecration of the patriarch Eliya I in 1028.

== Dioceses in the Mosul region ==
=== The diocese of Mosul ===
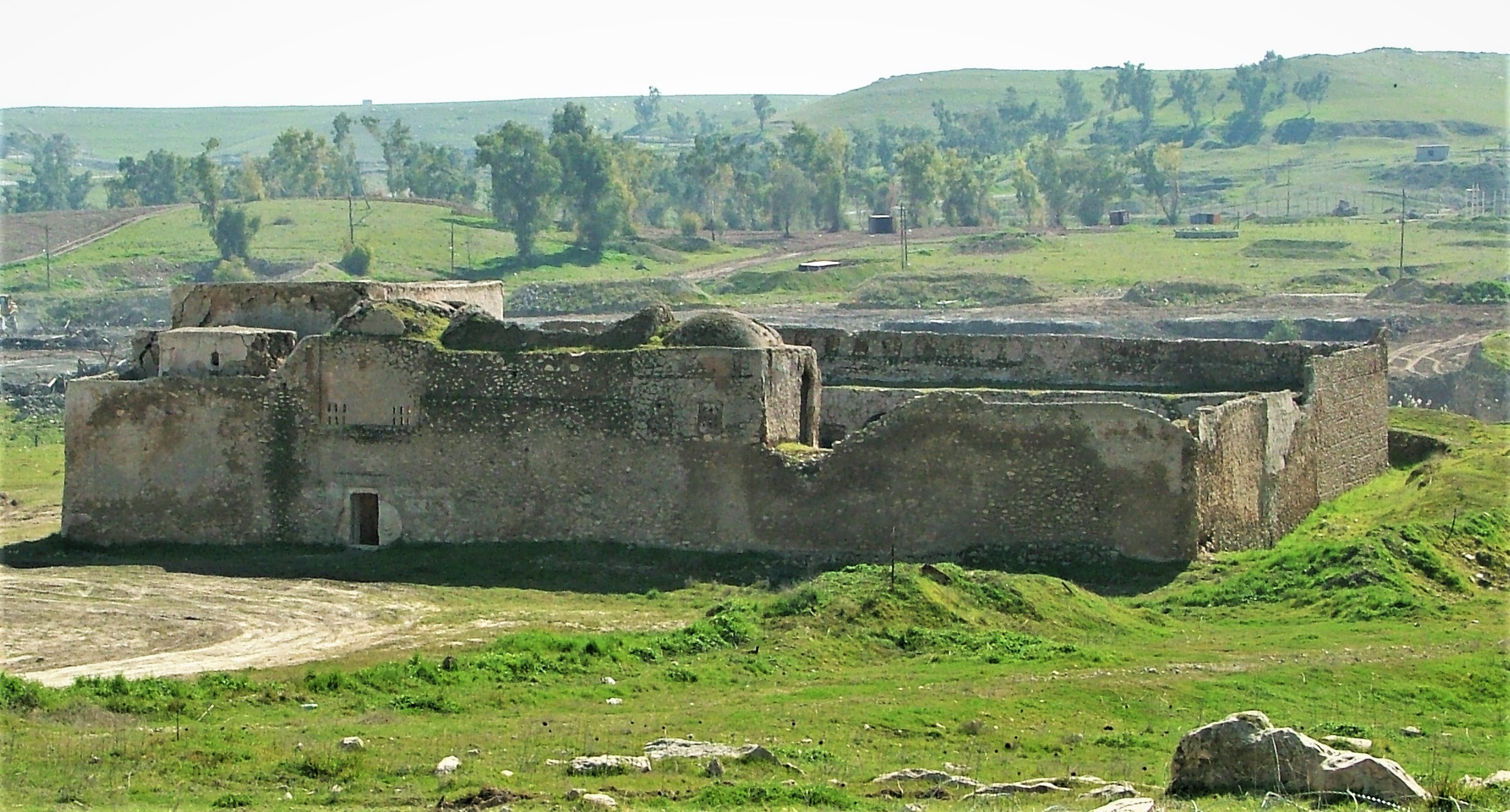
The East Syriac monastery of Mar Eliya, Mosul

Erbil, the chief town of Adiabene, lost much of its former importance with the growth of the city of Mosul, and during the reign of the patriarch Timothy I (780–823) the seat of the metropolitans of Adiabene was moved to Mosul. The dioceses of Adiabene were governed by a 'metropolitan of Mosul and Erbil' for the next four and a half centuries. Around 1200, Mosul and Erbil became separate metropolitan provinces. The last known metropolitan of Mosul and Erbil was Tittos, who was appointed by Eliya III (1175–89). Thereafter separate metropolitan bishops for Mosul and for Erbil are recorded in a fairly complete series from 1210 to 1318.

The metropolitan Nestorius 'of Athor' was among the bishops who witnessed a retraction of the Messallian heresy made by the priest Nestorius of the monastery of Mar Yozadaq in 790 before his consecration as bishop of Beth Nuhadra.

ʿAbdishoʿ bar Bahrīz, who flourished between 813 and 827, was metropolitan of Mosul and Hazza.

The future patriarch Enosh (877–84) was appointed metropolitan of Mosul by the patriarch Sargis (860–72).

The bishop Yohannan Ibn Bokhtishoʿ of Maʿaltha was appointed metropolitan of Mosul by the patriarch Yohannan III immediately after his consecration on 15 July 893. He was present at the consecration of the patriarch Yohannan IV in 900.

The metropolitan Luke of Mosul was one of only two metropolitans present at the consecration of the patriarch Emmanuel I on 23 February 938, because 'many metropolitans objected'.

The metropolitan Giwargis bar Tobi was appointed by the patriarch Emmanuel I (937–60), and was an unsuccessful candidate in the patriarchal elections of 960, 963 and 987. He was also one of three metropolitans who were present at the consecration of the patriarch Israel in 961. According to ʿAmr and Sliba, he was also present at the consecration of the patriarch Mari on 10 April 987. According to Mari, however, the diocese of Mosul was vacant at the end of the reign of the patriarch ʿAbdishoʿ I (968–86).

The bishop Ishoʿyahb of Haditha was appointed metropolitan of Mosul during the reign of the patriarch Mari (987–99).

The bishop Gabriel of Arzun was consecrated metropolitan 'of Erbil and Athor' by the patriarch Yohannan VI (1012–16) on 19 November 1012, the day of his own consecration as patriarch.

The metropolitan Eliya, metropolitan of Mosul (Athor) when Elijah of Nisibis completed his Chronography in 1018/19, was originally bishop of Piroz Shabur and later metropolitan of Damascus. He fled from Damascus to Baghdad because of a persecution directed against the 'western Christians', and was subsequently elected metropolitan of Mosul.

The bishop Yahballaha Ibn Abu Darah of Beth Nuhadra was consecrated metropolitan of Mosul by the patriarch Sabrishoʿ III shortly after his consecration in 1064, following the death of the metropolitan Gabriel of Mosul. He was present as 'metropolitan of Hazza and Mosul' at the consecration of the patriarch ʿAbdishoʿ II (1074–90) in 1074. He died in 1085, and was replaced as metropolitan of Mosul by the future patriarch Makkikha Ibn Sulaiman, bishop of Tirhan.

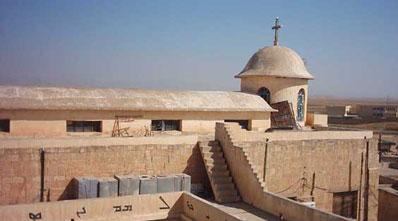
The Assyrian village of Tel Isqof, Mosul district

The metropolitan Yohannan Ibn al-Haddad of Mosul was present at the consecration of the patriarchs Bar Sawma in 1134 and ʿAbdishoʿ III in 1139.

The metropolitan Joseph 'of Athor and Nineveh' is mentioned together with the patriarch Yahballaha II (the start of whose reign has conventionally been placed in 1190) in the colophon of an East Syriac manuscript of August 1189.

The metropolitan Joseph of Mosul was present at the consecration of the patriarch Sabrishoʿ IV in 1222.

The metropolitan ʿAbdishoʿ of Mosul was present at the consecration of the patriarch Makkikha II in 1257.

The metropolitan Shemʿon of Mosul was present at the consecration of the patriarch Denha I in 1265.

The metropolitan Gabriel of Mosul was present at the consecration of the patriarch Yahballaha III in 1281.

The metropolitan Shemʿon of Mosul was present at the consecration of the patriarch Timothy II in 1318.

=== The diocese of Taimana ===
The bishop Mushe of Taimana was among the bishops who witnessed a retraction of the Messallian heresy made by the priest Nestorius of the monastery of Mar Yozadaq in 790 before his consecration as bishop of Beth Nuhadra.

=== The diocese of Nineveh ===
The bishop Ahudemmeh of Nineveh was among the signatories of the acts of the synod of Joseph in 554.

The bishop Yazdpanah of Nineveh was among the signatories of the acts of the synod of Ezekiel in 576.

The bishop Mar Aba of Nineveh was among the signatories of the acts of the synod of Ishoʿyahb I in 585.

The patriarch Maremmeh (646–50) was bishop of Nineveh during the reign of the patriarch Ishoʿyahb II (628–46), who consecrated him metropolitan of ʿIlam.

The patriarch Ishoʿyahb III of Adiabene (649–59) appears to have succeeded Maremmeh as bishop of Nineveh, perhaps around 630. In 637 he was appointed metropolitan of Erbil.

The bishop Mushe of Nineveh was among the bishops present at the deathbed of the patriarch Ishoʿyahb III in 659.

The monk Quriaqos of Awakh, of the monastery of Beth ʿAbe, became bishop of Nineveh at an unknown date in the second half of the 8th century or the first half of the 9th century.

== Dioceses in the ʿAmadiya and ʿAqra regions ==
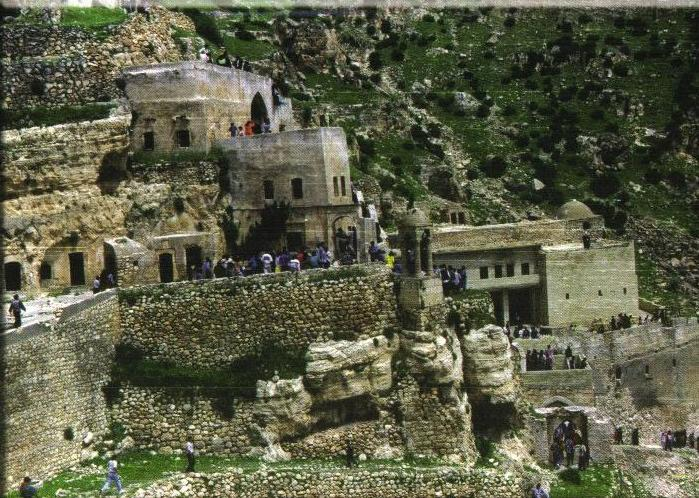
The East Syriac monastery of Rabban Hormizd, Alqosh

There were three main concentrations of East Syriac villages in the ʿAmadiya region: in the Sapna valley to the west of ʿAmadiya, in the Tigris plain around Dohuk, and in the Shemkan district, around the valley of the Gomel river. Before the 14th century the Ṣapna valley was part of the diocese of Dasen and Beth Ture ('the mountains'), which lay to the north of Marga and also covered the Berwari region and the Zibar and Lower Tiyari districts. The villages in the Dohuk district were included in the East Syriac diocese of Beth Nuhadra, whose bishops resided in the small town of Tel Hesh near Alqosh, and those in the Gomel valley in the diocese of Marga, centred on the ʿAqra region. The last-known bishops of Beth Nuhadra and Dasen, Malkishoʿ and Mattai, were present at the consecrations of Denha I in 1265 and Yahballaha III in 1281 respectively, and it is unclear when either diocese came to an end.

=== The diocese of Beth Nuhadra ===
The bishop Isaac of Beth Nuhadra was confirmed as a suffragan bishop of the metropolitan Daniel of Adiabene in Canon XXI of the synod of Isaac in 410.

The bishop Shlemun 'of Nuhadra' was one of eleven named bishops listed in the acts of the synod of Dadishoʿ in 424 as having been reproved at the synods of Isaac in 410 and Yahballaha I in 420.

The bishop Samuel of Beth Nuhadra was among the signatories of the acts of the synod of Babaï in 497.

The bishop Gawsishoʿ of Beth Nuhadra was among the signatories of the acts of the synod of Ishoʿyahb I in 585.

The bishop Yohannan of Beth Nuhadra was among the signatories of the acts of the synod of Gregory in 605.

The bishop Ephrem of Beth Nuhadra is mentioned together with the patriarch Yaʿqob in the colophon of an East Syriac manuscript of 759/760.

The priest Nestorius of the monastery of Mar Yozadaq was consecrated bishop of Beth Nuhadra in 790 after retracting the Messallian heresy in the presence of the metropolitans of Nisibis and Mosul and several other bishops.

The bishop Brikhishoʿ of Beth Nuhadra was present at the consecration of the patriarch Yohannan IV in 900.

Elijah, Elias, or Eliya of Nisibis was consecrated bishop of Beth Nuhadra by the patriarch Yohannan V on Sunday 15 February 1002. He became archbishop of Nisibis on Sunday 26 December 1008, in which office he wrote his famed Chronology.

The bishop Yahballaha Ibn Abu Darah of Beth Nuhadra was consecrated metropolitan of Mosul by the patriarch Sabrishoʿ III shortly after his consecration in 1064.

The bishop Mushe of Beth Nuhadra was present at the consecration of the patriarch Eliya II in 1111.

An unnamed bishop of Beth Nuhadra was present at the consecration of the patriarch Bar Sawma in 1134.

The bishop Sabrishoʿ of Beth Nuhadra is mentioned together with the patriarch 'Yahballaha of Athor' (Yahballaha II) in the dating formula of an East Syriac manuscript of 1208 copied in the monastery of Rabban Hormizd.

The bishop Ishoʿyahb of Beth Nuhadra was present at the consecration of the patriarch Makkikha II in 1257.

The bishop Malkishoʿ of Beth Nuhadra was present at the consecration of the patriarch Denha I in 1265.

=== The diocese of Beth Dasen ===
The bishop Ahadabui of Beth Dasen was confirmed as a suffragan bishop of the metropolitan Daniel of Adiabene in Canon XXI of the synod of Isaac in 410.

The bishop Qiris of Dasen was among the signatories of the acts of the synod of Dadishoʿ in 424.

The bishop Mareh-rahmeh of Beth Dasen was among the signatories of the acts of the synod of Babaï in 497.

The bishop Qamishoʿ of Beth Dasen was among the signatories of the acts of the synod of Ezekiel in 576.

The bishop Burzmihr of Beth Dasen was among the signatories of the acts of the synod of Gregory in 605.

The bishop Stephen of Dasen was a contemporary of the metropolitan Maranʿammeh of Adiabene, who was appointed by Yaʿqob II (754–73) and died shortly after the accession of Timothy I in 780. During Stephen's episcopate Maranʿammeh adjusted the boundaries of the dioceses of Dasen and Marga, transferring the districts of Nahla and Talana from Marga to Dasen and also assigning the Great Monastery to the diocese of Dasen.

The bishop Mattai of Dasen was present at the consecrations of the patriarchs Denha I in 1265 and Yahballaha III in 1281.

=== The diocese of Marga (Tella and Barbelli) ===
The diocese of Marga, attested between the eighth and 14th centuries and frequently mentioned in Thomas of Marga's Book of Governors, included a large number of villages and monasteries around ʿAqra. In the middle of the 8th century, the diocese is known to have included the districts of Sapsapa (the Navkur plain south of ʿAqra, on the east bank of the Khazir river), Talana and Nahla d'Malka (two valleys around the upper course of the Khazir river) and Beth Rustaqa (the Gomel valley), and it probably also included several villages in the Zibar district. The metropolitan Maranʿammeh of Adiabene, who flourished in the third quarter of the 8th century, adjusted the boundaries of the dioceses of Dasen and Marga, transferring the districts of Nahla and Talana from Marga to Dasen and also assigning the Great Monastery to the diocese of Dasen.

The diocese of Marga is first mentioned in the 8th century (the region was probably in the diocese of Beth Nuhadra previously), and several of its bishops are mentioned between the 8th century and the first half of the 13th century. By the second half of the 13th century, the names of two villages in the Gomel valley, Tella and Barbelli (Billan), were also included in the title of the diocese. The last-known bishop of Tella and Barbelli, Ishoʿyahb, was present at the consecration of the patriarch Timothy II in 1318. The diocese is not mentioned thereafter, and no other bishops are known from the ʿAqra region until the 19th century.

=== The diocese of Salakh ===
The diocese of Salakh (ܣܠܟ), which covered the mountainous region to the east of Rawanduz, does not feature in the classical lists of the dioceses of Adiabene, but several 8th-century bishops of Salakh are mentioned in Thomas of Marga's Book of Governors (written c.840). The History of Mar Sabrishoʿ of Beth Qoqa also mentions a 9th-century bishop of Salakh. It is not clear when the diocese came to an end.

== Dioceses in the Hakkari and Urmi regions ==
=== The diocese of Beth Bgash ===
The bishop Barinos of Beth Bgash was confirmed as a suffragan bishop of the metropolitan Daniel of Adiabene in Canon XXI of the synod of Isaac in 410.

The bishop Mari of Beth Bgash was among the signatories of the acts of the synod of Dadishoʿ in 424.

The bishop Aphrahat of Beth Bgash was among the signatories of the acts of the synod of Acacius in 486, and his secretary Hawah signed the acts of the synod of Babaï in 497 on his behalf.

The bishop Mushe of Beth Bgash was among the signatories of the acts of the synod of Mar Aba I in 544.

The bishop Timothy of Beth Bgash was among the signatories of the acts of the synods of Ishoʿyahb I in 585 and Gregory in 605.

The 8th-century metropolitan Yohannan of Adiabene, nephew of the celebrated East Syriac writers Hnanishoʿ and Ishoʿyahb of Beth ʿAbe, was originally a monk of the monastery of Beth ʿAbe, later its superior, and later still bishop of Beth Bgash. He was consecrated metropolitan of Adiabene between 714 and 728 by the patriarch Sliba-zkha.

The bishop Shemʿon of Beth Bgash, who flourished around the middle of the 8th century, is mentioned on several occasions by Thomas of Marga. He was consecrated bishop of Beth Bgash by the metropolitan Maranʿammeh of Adiabene (754–73), built a church in the village of Shalmath (modern Sharmen) near ʿAqra, was bishop of Beth Bgash for only three years, and after his death was buried in the church of Bai.

The elderly bishop Giwargis, uncle of the patriarch Timothy I, was bishop of Beth Bgash c.765, and may well have been Shemʿon's immediate successor.

The future patriarch Timothy I became bishop of Beth Bgash c.770, upon the retirement of his uncle Giwargis, and remained in the diocese until his election as patriarch in 780.

The monks Diodorus and ʿAbdishoʿ of the monastery of Beth ʿAbe were 'elected bishops of Beth Bgash, one after the other' at unknown dates in the second half of the 8th century or the first half of the 9th century.

The bishop Mark of Beth Bgash was appointed metropolitan of Rai by the patriarch Yohannan III immediately after his consecration on 15 July 893.

The bishop Shlemun of Beth Bgash was present at the consecration of the patriarch Yohannan IV in 900.

The monk Sabrishoʿ of the monastery of Mar Mikha'il near Mosul was consecrated bishop of Beth Bgash by the patriarch Eliya II (1111–32).

The bishop Ishoʿzkha of Beth Bgash was present at the consecration of the patriarch Denha I in 1265.

=== The diocese of Adarbaigan ===
The diocese of Adarbaigan appears to have covered the territory included within the Sassanian province of Atropatene. It was bounded on the west by the Salmas and Urmi plains to the west of Lake Urmi, and on the south by the diocese of Salakh, which included the districts around the modern town of Rawanduz. Its centre seems to have been the town of Ganzak. Adarbaigan was not among the dioceses assigned to a metropolitan province in 410, but by the 8th century it was part of the metropolitan province of Adiabene. The metropolitan Maranʿammeh of Adiabene, who flourished during the third quarter of the 8th century, adjusted the boundaries of the dioceses of Salakh and Adarbaigan, transferring the district of Daibur from Salakh to Adarbaigan and the district of Inner Salakh from Adarbaigan to Salakh. These boundary changes probably affected Christian communities living in the upper valley of the Lesser Zab river.

A separate East Syriac metropolitan province was created for Adarbaigan in the second half of the 13th century, possibly centred on Tabriz. Raiding and brigandage were rife in Mesopotamia at this period, and the creation of a new East Syriac metropolitan province reflected a migration of Christians from the Tigris plains to the relative safety of Adarbaigan, where there was a strong Mongol military presence. By the 16th century the title 'Adarbaigan' had been assumed by the East Syriac bishops of Salmas, doubtless reflecting a memory that the Salmas district had once been part of the diocese of Adarbaigan.

== See also ==
- Adiabene
- Assuristan
- Assyria (Roman province)
- Sennacherib II
