= Abdisho =

- Pronunciation: English: /ʕav.diːʃoːʕ./; Assyrian Neo-Aramaic: [ʔoːdiːʃoʔ.]
- Gender: Masculine

Origin
- Origin: Classical Syriac: ܥܒܕܝܫܘܥ (Abdisho)
- Meaning: Servant of Jesus

Other names
- Alternative spelling: Abdicho, Abd'icho, ʾAbdisho, Abdishu, ʿAbd Īshōʿ

Abdisho, ʾAbdisho, Abdishu, or ʿAbd Īshōʿ (Syriac: ܥܒܕܝܫܘܥ, Arabic: عبد يشوع) meaning 'servant of Jesus' in Syriac, is a masculine given name. The name is most predominantly used by Syriac Christians of West Asia, namely the Assyrians.

The name is derived from the Syriac word "abd" (Syriac: ܥܒܕܐ, romanized: ˁaḇd, lit. 'servant') and the Aramaic name for Jesus, Isho (Syriac: ܝܼܫܘܿܥ, romanized: īšōˁ). Abdisho can also alternatively be spelled as Odisho, used as a surname.

Persons with this name include:

- Abdisho (died 345) (298–345), deacon and martyr of the Church of the East
- Abda and Abdisho, two Christian bishops who were martyred on May 16, in either 376
- Abdisho I, Patriarch of the Church of the East from 963 to 986
- Abdisho II, Patriarch of the Church of the East from 1074 to 1090
- Abdisho III, Patriarch of the Church of the East from 1139 to 1148
- Abdisho bar Berika (Ebed-Jesu) (died 1318), author of medieval catalogue of ancient Greek and Syriac writers
- Abdisho IV Maron, second Patriarch of the Chaldean Catholic Church, from 1555 to 1570
- Abdisho V Khayat, or Mar Audishu V Khayyath (1827–1899), patriarch of the Chaldean Catholic Church from 1894 to 1899
- Habib ibn Bahriz, or ʿAbdishoʿ bar Bahrīz, a 9th-century bishop and scholar for the Church of the East

Figures with the name 'Abdisho' are also attested in the early History of Christianity and the Syriac rites:

- a companion in martyrdom to Desan (bishop), who was bishop of the Christian Church
- a martyr at Arbela in 376 alongside Acepsimas of Hnaita

== See also ==
- Odisho
- Isho
