= Mahad, Iraq =

Mahad Mehetê / مەھەتێ
- Village
- Location in Iraq
- Coordinates: 36°38′50″N 43°24′42″E
- Country: Iraq
- Region: Kurdistan Region
- Governorate: Dohuk Governorate
- District: Shekhan District

Population
  - Estimate (2018): 11,000

Mahad (Arabic: مهد; Kurdish: مەھەتێ, romanized: Mehetê) is a village located in the Shekhan District of the Dohuk Governorate of Kurdistan Region in Iraq. The village is located 9 kilometres (5.6 mi) southeast of Ain Sifni in the Nineveh Plains. Mahad is populated by Yazidis.

== History ==
In 1975, Ba'athists made Mahad an exclusively Yazidi settlement as part of their projects of Arabizing the area. They moved the inhabitants from 13 Yazidi villages in the vicinity together into one place and replaced their villages with thousands of Arab settlers. Between 1975 and 2003, these colonizers destroyed most of the Yazidi mausoleums in those villages. Mam Rashan, Jarwana, Baqasre, Betnar, Mahmuda, Musakan and Kandale villages in Shekhan region were destroyed by the Iraqi government and their inhabitants were relocated to the collective town of Mahad.

With the fall of Saddam Hussein's regime in 2003, Yezidis began returning to their native villages while the Arab settlers left. The Yazidi mausoleums were reconstructed and large numbers of Yazidi brought their dead, buried in Mahad, back to their villages.

On 6 August 2014, with ISIS advance, the inhabitants of Mahad fled the area and sought refuge mainly in the nearby cities of Zakho, Amadia and Dohuk. Ten days later, when ISIS advance was pushed back, most of the displaced began returning to Mahad

In 2015, Mahad and the 13 villages in the vicinity still had 9,210 inhabitants. Three years later, in 2018, the population of the complex had reached almost 11,000 inhabitants

== Yazidi holy sites ==
In Mahad as well as the surrounding villages that were incorporated into the collective town of Mahad, the following shrines can be found:

1. Pîr Dawûd
2. Pîr Afat
3. Şerfedîn
4. Şêx Zirrî
5. Şêx Fexir
6. Şêx Mehmûd
7. Şêx Mûsa Sor
8. Melik Şêxsin
9. Tawûsî Melek
