= Maremmeh =

Orthodox Syrian bishop

Maremmeh was patriarch in the Church of the East from 646 to 649.

== Sources ==
Brief accounts of Maremmeh's patriarchate are given in the Chronicle of Seert (an anonymous ninth-century Nestorian ecclesiastical history), the Ecclesiastical Chronicle of the Jacobite writer Bar Hebraeus (thirteenth-century), and the ecclesiastical histories of the Nestorian writers Mari (twelfth-century), ʿAmr (fourteenth-century) and Sliba (fourteenth-century).

== Maremmeh's patriarchate ==
The following account of Maremmeh's patriarchate is given in the Chronicle of Seert:

This father was originally from Arzun. After studying at the School of Nisibis, he became a monk in the monastery of Mar Abraham, where he lived in a cell from which he never emerged. He was subsequently appointed bishop of Nineveh. His predecessor the patriarch Ishoʿyahb wrote to the inhabitants of Jundishapur, who had asked him for a metropolitan for their country, praising the virtues of this father, who was then bishop of Nineveh. He then sent for him and consecrated him. He governed this throne with great wisdom. In the patriarchal election held after the death of Ishoʿyahb he was elected patriarch in spite of his advanced age. He was good, virtuous and charitable, and was anxious to increase the number of scholars. He was the first to order the scholars to gird themselves with a belt to distinguish themselves from other people. Three years after his consecration, during a visit to Karkha d'Gedan, he fell ill as a result of the hardships of the journey and the heat. He refused to take the remedies the doctors prescribed for him and kept saying, 'The harvest is ready'. He died in the days of ʿOthman bin ʿAffan, after a reign of three years. Some historians say that the Moslems worked to make him catholicus because, when he was bishop of Nineveh at the time of the conquest, he had brought them food during their invasion of the Mosul region.

== See also ==
- List of patriarchs of the Church of the East

== Notes ==
Church of the East titles
Preceded by Ishoʿyahb II (628–645)	Catholicos-Patriarch of the East (646–649)	Succeeded by Ishoʿyahb III (649–659)
