= Ishoyahb II =

Sasanian patriarch

Ishoʿyahb II of Gdala was Patriarch of the Church of the East from 628 to 645. He reigned during a period of great upheaval in the Sasanian Empire. He became patriarch at the end of a disastrous war between the Byzantine Empire and Persia, which weakened both powers. Two years later the Muslim Arabs began a career of conquest in which they overthrew the Sassanids and occupied the eastern provinces of the Byzantine Empire. Ishoʿyahb lived through this momentous period, and is said to have met both the Byzantine emperor Heraclius and the second Muslim caliph Umar.

The Syriac name Ishoʿyahb means 'Jesus has given', and is spelled variously in English. Alternative spellings include Yeshuyab and Ishu-yahb. Ishoʿyahb II is commonly known as Ishoʿyahb of Gdala, to distinguish him from two near-contemporary Eastern patriarchs, Ishoʿyahb I of Arzun (582–95) and Ishoʿyahb III of Adiabene (649–59).

== Sources ==
Ishoʿyahb's patriarchate, the Arab conquest of Iraq and Ishoʿyahb's dealings with the Muslim leaders are described in considerable detail in the Chronicle of Seert. Briefer accounts are given in the Ecclesiastical Chronicle of the Jacobite writer Bar Hebraeus (thirteenth-century), and the ecclesiastical histories of the Nestorian writers Mari (twelfth-century), ʿAmr (fourteenth-century) and Sliba (fourteenth-century).

== Life ==
Ishoʿyahb was a native of the village of Gdala in the district of Beth ʿArbaye between Nisibis and Mosul.

Ishoʿyahb studied at the School of Nisibis when it was under the presidency of the controversial theologian Henana, who searched for common theological ground between the Nestorianism of the Church of the East and the Chalcedonian doctrines held in the Roman Empire. He was one of the 300 students who left the college when Henana was expelled. After a long vacancy in the patriarchate, he was elected patriarch of the Church of the East in 628.

In 630 Ishoʿyahb led a delegation of Persian clerics to Aleppo to discuss with the Roman emperor Heraclius the possibility of a reconciliation between the Roman and Persian Churches. Although little is known of the content of Ishoʿyahb’s discussions with Heraclius, he evidently persuaded the emperor that, despite its traditional reverence for the teachings of Theodore of Mopsuestia, the doctrinal position of the Church of the East was orthodox. He was asked for his views on monoenergism, the doctrine of the single energy recently espoused by the patriarchate of Constantinople, and responded with a confession of faith which was accepted by the Roman bishops. Two masses were then celebrated, one conducted by Ishoʿyahb according to the rite used by the Church of the East, in which both Heraclius and his bishops received the eucharist from his hands, and one according to the Chalcedonian rite. In his mass Ishoʿyahb omitted the customary references to the 'three doctors' Diodorus, Theodore and Nestorius, hoping that the Romans would avoid any mention of Cyril of Alexandria in theirs; but his conciliatory gesture was not reciprocated by the Romans. On his return to Persia Ishoʿyahb was accused by the bishop Bar Sawma of Susa of making damaging concessions to the Romans.

Ishoʿyahb II was patriarch during the Arab conquest of Iraq, and according to later Nestorian tradition approached the Muslim leaders to win guarantees for the treatment of Christians in the Sasanian Empire. The Chronicle of Seert, probably written in the ninth century, records two approaches to the Muslims, one by Ishoʿyahb's emissaries to Muhammad's successor Abu Bakr (632–4), and a second by Ishoʿyahb himself to the caliph Umar (634–44). Umar is said to have granted the Church of the East a charter of protection. The authenticity of these supposed approaches is very doubtful, and modern authorities are inclined to reject them.

Ctesiphon, the capital of the Sasanian Empire and the seat of the Nestorian patriarchs at this period, fell to Sa'd ibn Abi Waqqas in the spring of 637. Sa'd carried off its gates, symbolising the rulership of central Iraq, to Kufa, and for the rest of his reign Ishoʿyahb resided at Karka d'Beth Slokh (modern Kirkuk) in Beth Garmai.

In 645 Ishoʿyahb journeyed to Nisibis to settle a dispute between the city's Nestorian Christians and their metropolitan Quriaqos. He died at Karkh Guddan and was buried there.

=== Literary achievement ===
Ishoʿyahb II is included in the list of Syriac authors compiled by the fourteenth-century Nestorian writer ʿAbdishoʿ of Nisibis. According to ʿAbdishoʿ, his principal writings were a commentary on the Psalms and a number of letters, histories, and homilies. A hymn of his has survived in a Nestorian psalter (British Library Add MS 14675).

=== Nestorian mission to China, 635 ===
The first recorded Christian mission to China arrived in the Chinese capital of Chang'an in 635, during Ishoʿyahb's reign. The mission, whose history was recorded on the famous Nestorian Stele, erected in Chang'an in 781, was led by a Nestorian monk with the Chinese name A-lo-pen. It is possible, but by no means certain, that Ishoʿyahb was behind this initiative.

== Relations with Byzantium ==
According to Dale T. Irvin: "Early in the seventh century Catholicos Yeshuyab II shared communion with the East Roman emperor when the former was sent on a diplomatic mission on behalf of the shah, but this was by then an exception."

== See also ==
- List of Patriarchs of the Church of the East

== Notes ==
Church of the East titles
| Preceded by Gregory (605–609); Vacant (609–628) | Catholicos-Patriarch of the East (628–645) | Succeeded by Maremmeh (646–649) |
