= Odisho =

- Pronunciation: /oʊdiʃoʊ/; Classical Syriac: [ʕabdiʃoʕ], Syriac: [ʔo.diːʃo.], Syriac: [ʕaw.diːʃoʕ.]
- Gender: Masculine

Origin
- Origin: Classical Syriac: ܥܒܕܝܫܘܥ (Abdisho)
- Meaning: "servant of Jesus"

Other names
- Alternative spelling: Odicho, Awdisho, Audisho
- Nickname: Odi

Odisho, Odicho, Awdisho, or Audisho (Syriac: ܥܲܒ݂ܕܝܼܫܘܿܥ) is a masculine given name of Classical Syriac and Neo-Aramaic origin and a surname. It is predominantly used by ethnic Assyrians, who follow churches of the Syriac-rite of Christianity.

The name is derived from the Syriac word "abd" (Syriac: ܥܒܕܐ, romanized: ˁaḇd, lit. 'servant') and the Aramaic name for Jesus, Isho (Syriac: ܝܼܫܘܿܥ, romanized: īšōˁ). Odisho also has the same meaning as the given name Abdisho.

Persons with the name Odisho as a given name include:

- Odisho Oraham (born 1961), bishop of the Assyrian Church of the East in Scandinavia and Germany

Persons with the name Odisho as a surname include:

- Ayoub Odisho (born 1960), Iraqi football manager and former player
- Michael Odisho, Australian gangster
- Tiras Odisho, martial artist of Iraqi-Assyrian origin
- Ramina Odicho, Assyrian American comedian with origins from Syria
- William Ishaya Odisho, Iraqi-Assyrian former diplomat for the United Nations
- Ashoor Audisho, Assyrian-Australian murdered in 2006 by members of the gang The Last Hour

== See also ==
- Abdisho, the Classical Syriac form of the name
- Isho
