= Adarbaigan (East Syriac diocese) =

Classical diocese of the Church of the East

Diocese of Adarbaigan was one of the classical East Syriac dioceses of the Church of the East. The diocese, attested between the fifth and eighth centuries, was centred on the town of Ganzak and was included in the metropolitan province of Adiabene.

== History ==
Map showing the relative positions of Adiabene and Adarbaigan (Atropatene)

The diocese of Adarbaigan appears to have covered the territory included within the Sassanian province of Atropatene. It was bounded on the west by the Salmas and Urmi plains to the west of Lake Urmi, and on the south by the diocese of Salakh, which included the districts around the modern town of Rawanduz. Its centre seems to have been the town of Ganzak. Adarbaigan was not among the dioceses assigned to a metropolitan province in 410, but by the eighth century it was part of the metropolitan province of Adiabene. The metropolitan Maranʿammeh of Adiabene, who flourished during the third quarter of the eighth century, adjusted the boundaries of the dioceses of Salakh and Adarbaigan, transferring the district of Daibur from Salakh to Adarbaigan and the district of Inner Salakh from Adarbaigan to Salakh. These boundary changes probably affected Christian communities living in the upper valley of the Lesser Zab river.

A separate East Syriac metropolitan province was created for Adarbaigan in the second half of the thirteenth century, possibly centred on Tabriz. Raiding and brigandage were rife in Mesopotamia at this period, and the creation of a new East Syriac metropolitan province reflected a migration of Christians from the Tigris plains to the relative safety of Adarbaigan, where there was a strong Mongol military presence. By the sixteenth century the title 'Adarbaigan' had been assumed by the East Syriac bishops of Salmas, doubtless reflecting a memory that the Salmas district had once been part of the diocese of Adarbaigan.

== Bishops of Adarbaigan ==
The bishop Hosea of 'Ganzak of Adarbaigan' was among the signatories of the acts of the synod of Acacius in 486.

The bishop Yohannan 'of Adarbaigan' was among the signatories of the acts of the synod of Mar Aba I in 544.

The bishop Melchisedec of Adarbaigan adhered by letter to the acts of the synod of Joseph in 554, and was among the signatories of the acts of the synod of Ezekiel in 576.

The bishop Hnanishoʿ of Adarbaigan was among the signatories of the acts of the synod of Gregory in 605.
