= Abraham III of Seleucia-Ctesiphon =

Abraham III Abraza was Patriarch of the Church of the East from 906 to 937. He was remembered as a patriarch who was well-versed in his ecclesiastical duties but was also hot-tempered and corrupt.

== Sources ==
Brief accounts of Abraham's patriarchate are given in the Ecclesiastical Chronicle of the Jacobite writer Bar Hebraeus (floruit 1280) and in the ecclesiastical histories of the Nestorian writers Mari (twelfth-century), ʿAmr (fourteenth-century) and Sliba (fourteenth-century)

== Abraham's election ==
The following account of Abraham's election is given by Bar Hebraeus:

He [Yohannan IV] was succeeded by Abraham III of Beth Garmaï, the bishop of Marga, who was in Baghdad when the catholicus Yohannan died. At that time there lived the scribe ʿAbdallah, son of Shemʿon, a man of very great influence at the king's court. This man procured a royal decree for him, after first obtaining from Abraham a written promise that he would show no favour to the petition of Theodore (who later embraced Islam when he was caught in fornication with an Arab woman, and accepted her among his wives), but would rather show special honour to Shemʿon's son, and raise him to a higher rank than any of his colleagues. So Abraham set out for Seleucia, and was consecrated on the tenth day of the latter kanun [January] in the year 293 of the Arabs [AD 906], on the eleventh day of the third month. He was well versed in his ecclesiastical duties, but was too fond of money and also prone to anger. He secured the catholicate for himself by bribery.

They say that after the death of the catholicus Yohannan the metropolitan of Mosul Yohannan Bar Bokhtishoʿ wrote to ask for Abraham's backing, and that Abraham wrote back advising him to wait for a while and not rush down to Baghdad, so as to avoid a repetition of the events that had followed the death of the catholicus Yunanis. Abraham told him to stay at home until he was able to forge a consensus, and promised to send for Yohannan as soon as he was sure that he would be welcomed with honour. Bar Bokhtishoʿ trusted in Abraham's word, and remained at home awaiting his summons. Meanwhile, Abraham betrayed him and obtained the leadership for himself. When Yohannan heard of this, he was furious and hastened down to Baghdad, but his opposition was of no avail. After a bitter argument between the two men, Yohannan quietly withdrew to the monastery of Mar Pethion. There he was informed that the catholicus Abraham had come to see him and to humble himself before him. Yohannan swore on the gospel, 'If he comes to me, I shall make him sit on the throne of the bishops, in his former seat.' A little while later the catholicus unexpectedly came over to him, and when Yohnnan saw him he stopped him, rose and went over to him, and made him sit above him. Then Abraham said to him, 'Father, you are worthier than I, and the office of catholicus should by rights be yours, not mine. I wish to hand over the office to you, and ask only that you make me your vicar and treat me as your disciple.' Yohannan was touched by his humility, and left with him and took part with him in the celebration of the mysteries. On the same day Abraham conceded to Yohannan all the privileges of reading the gospel and praying, and treated him with honour. Afterwards Yohannan's friends reproached him for swearing on oath to do one thing and then doing the opposite. He said to them, 'Believe me, I really intended to snub him. But as soon as I saw him, my reason prevailed over my will, and I no longer felt inclined to break the law and deny him the honour due to his rank.'

== Relations with the Melkites and Jacobites ==
The most important event of Abraham's reign was a crisis provoked by the arrival of a Greek Orthodox metropolitan in Baghdad. Abraham was able to extract a firman from the caliph al-Muqtadir (907–32) stipulating that only the catholicus of the Nestorians might reside permanently in Baghdad. This concession, doubtless obtained by bribery, as alleged by Bar Hebraeus, represented a striking victory for the Nestorians not only over the Melkites but also over the Jacobites, and the Nestorians invoked al-Muqtadir's firman on several occasions thereafter in defence of their privileges. The following account of this incident is given by Bar Hebraeus, who wrongly presents it as a bilateral agreement between the Nestorians and the Melkites. Neither church enjoyed such powers under Arab rule, and other sources confirm that the dispute was settled by the issue of a firman by the caliph al-Muqtadir:

The Greeks at that time were living in great numbers in Baghdad, and their scribes, doctors and common people asked Eliya, the Chalcedonian patriarch of Antioch, to send them a metropolitan. A certain Jani [John] was sent to them. After he arrived and took up residence in a Greek church in Baghdad, he was attacked by Abraham, the catholicus of the Nestorians, who brought him to trial before the wazir. 'We Nestorians', said the catholicus, 'are the friends of the Arab people, and pray for their victory. How can this enemy of the Arab people possibly be given the same honours as me?' The wazir replied, 'You Christians are all alike! You all hate us, and you just put on a show of friendship!' The catholicus was struck dumb, and could not find a word to say. But he promised a thousand dinars to one of the great doctors of the Arabs, who was sitting next to him, to take up his cause. This man said, 'How can you treat the Nestorians, who have no other ruler except the Arabs, the same as the Greeks, whose kings are constantly at war with the Arabs? In their attitude towards us, they are as different as friends and enemies.' The Arabs who were standing by all applauded the doctor's words. The catholicus Abraham is said to have laid out 30,000 gold dinars to bring Eliya, the patriarch of the Greeks, to Baghdad in the year 300 of the Arabs (AD 912), where he obtained a written promise from him that no Greek catholicus or metropolitan would remain permanently in Baghdad, and that if circumstances required him to send a bishop to visit the Greeks of Baghdad, the bishop would return to his own country as soon as he had transacted his business.

== Ecclesiastical reforms ==
Nestorian Christians in the ʿAbbasid caliphate were in the habit of fasting on Sundays and during the forty days of Lent, but by Abraham's time some of the Christians of Baghdad were breaking their Sunday fast in daylight, at outdoor barbecue parties, after celebrating the eucharist in the early afternoon. Abraham put an end to this practice, which he doubtless considered unseemly, by deferring the eucharist service to the early evening. He enforced this new custom by writing to the bishops of all the far-flung dioceses of the Church of the East. The following account of Abraham's innovation is given by Bar Hebraeus:

In the same year [AD 937] the catholicus Abraham died, having fulfilled his office for thirty-two years. Up to his time the Nestorians had kept Sundays and the days of the Lenten Fast like all the other Christian peoples. They used to offer sacrifice at the third hour, then each man would go home and break his fast indoors. But the catholicus was told that some people celebrated the eucharist on Sunday and then sat down to an alfresco banquet in their gardens. The catholicus forbade the eucharist to be celebrated before evening on Sundays and during the Lenten Fast, and wrote to all the regions informing them of these prohibitions. In this way a new custom was established, which the Nestorians observe to this day.

== See also ==
- List of patriarchs of the Church of the East

== Notes ==
Church of the East titles
Preceded by Yohannan IV (900–905)	Catholicos-Patriarch of the East (906–937)	Succeeded by Emmanuel I (937–960)
