= Marga (East Syriac diocese) =

Map showing the ancient sites of Upper Mesopotamia and Syria. Marga region is in the midd-east.

The Diocese of Marga was an East Syriac diocese of the Church of the East. The diocese was included in the metropolitan province of Adiabene, and is attested between the eighth and fourteenth centuries. Towards the end of the thirteenth century the name of the diocese was changed to 'Tella and Barbelli'.

== History ==
The diocese of Marga, attested between the eighth and fourteenth centuries and frequently mentioned in Thomas of Marga's Book of Governors, included a large number of villages and monasteries around ʿAqra. In the middle of the eighth century the diocese is known to have included the districts of Sapsapa (the Navkur plain south of ʿAqra, on the east bank of the Khazir river), Talana and Nahla d'Malka (two valleys around the upper course of the Khazir river) and Beth Rustaqa (the Gomel valley), and it probably also included several villages in the Zibar district. The metropolitan Maranʿammeh of Adiabene, who flourished in the third quarter of the eighth century, adjusted the boundaries of the dioceses of Dasen and Marga, transferring the districts of Nahla and Talana from Marga to Dasen and also assigning the Great Monastery to the diocese of Dasen.

The diocese of Marga is first mentioned in the eighth century (the region was probably in the diocese of Beth Nuhadra previously), and several of its bishops are mentioned between the eighth century and the first half of the thirteenth century. By the second half of the thirteenth century the names of two villages in the Gomel valley, Tella and Barbelli (Billan), were also included in the title of the diocese. The last-known bishop of Tella and Barbelli, Ishoʿyahb, was present at the synod of Timothy II in 1318. The diocese is not mentioned thereafter, and no other bishops are known from the ʿAqra region until the nineteenth century.

== Bishops of Marga ==
The bishop ʿAbdishoʿ of Marga was among the bishops who witnessed a retraction of the Messallian heresy made by the priest Nestorius of the monastery of Mar Yozadaq in 790 before his consecration as bishop of Beth Nuhadra.

The monks Laʿzar, Gabriel and Yaʿqob of the monastery of Beth ʿAbe were bishops of Marga at unknown dates in the second half of the eighth century or the first half of the ninth century.

Thomas of Marga, author of the Book of Governors, was bishop of Marga around the middle of the ninth century. According to Wallis Budge he was appointed bishop of Marga by the patriarch Abraham I (837–50).

The patriarch Abraham III (906–37) was bishop of Marga before his consecration as patriarch on 10 January 906.

A manuscript was copied in the monastery of Beth ʿAbe in 1218 for the village of Beth Bozi at the request of the bishop ʿAbdishoʿ of Marga.

The bishop Shemʿon 'of Tella and Barbelli' was present at the consecration of the patriarch Denha I in 1265. He was also present at the consecration of the patriarch Yahballaha III in 1281.

A manuscript copied in the monastery of Beth ʿAbe in 1218 for the village of Beth Bozi contains a note written in 1297 or slightly later by the bishop ʿAbdishoʿ of Karamlish, 'bishop of Marga, Tella and Barbella'.

The bishop Ishoʿyahb of 'Tella and Barbelli' was present at the consecration of the patriarch Timothy II in 1318.

== Topographical survey ==
The Christian topography of the ʿAqra region before the fourteenth century is known in unusually fine detail. The seventh-century History of Rabban Bar ʿIdta and Thomas of Marga's ninth-century Book of Governors supply the names of a large number of nearby monasteries, sanctuaries, and villages, many of which can be localised.

There were more than twenty monasteries in the Marga region in the ninth century. Besides the important monasteries of Rabban Bar ʿIdta and Mar Yaʿqob of Beth ʿAbe, there were three other monasteries in the Sapsapa district: the monastery of Bar Tura, the monastery of Rabban Cyprian; and the monastery of Mar Ishoʿrahma. There was a 'great monastery' in either the Nahla d'Malka or Talana district. In Beth Rustaqa there were monasteries of Mar Gregory, Mar Aba, Mar Hnanishoʿ, Abba Hbisha and Mar Ithallaha. At least ten other monasteries are known to have existed in the ninth century, but they cannot now be confidently localised. Little is known of most of these monasteries and, with two exceptions, none are mentioned after the tenth century.

The monastic histories also mentioned over sixty East Syriac villages either in the Marga region or not far beyond it, some of which still had Christian communities in 1913. The histories often indicate at least the approximate locality of these villages, and many of their names remain recognisable today.

A passage in the Book of Governors also describes how schools were founded in a number of monasteries and villages in the Marga region by the eighth-century reformer Rabban Babaï. Evidently the importance of education was recognised by several influential East Syriacs in the region, and at least some villages were sufficiently prosperous to maintain schools:

When this blessed man had come to the country of Marga, he first of all gathered together the scholars and founded the hudra, and revised and corrected the sections. He next built a school in Bashosh, a village of Sapsapa, and after this another in the monastery of Barsil, in the province of Garin, another in the monastery of Shamira, another in the monastery of Qori, another in ʿEqra, another in Khardes, another in Shalmath, another in Beth ʿEdraï, another in Htara, another in Maqqabtha, another in Sawra d’Niram d’Raʿawatha, another in Qob, another in Nerab Barzaï, another in Gube, another in the monastery of Mar Ephrem, another in the monastery of Mar Ahha, another in Maya Qarire, another in Beth Asa, another in Beth Sati, another in Beth Qardagh, another in Hennes, another in Beth Rastaq, another in Beth Narqos and another in Beth Tarshmaye.

This prosperity did not last. Few of the Marga villages named in the monastic histories are mentioned again, and it is very probable that by the fourteenth century the only East Syriac villages which remained in the ʿAqra region were the twenty or thirty villages which survived into the nineteenth century.
