= Yohannan IV =

Yohannan IV was Patriarch of the Church of the East from 900 to 905.

== Sources ==
Accounts of Yohannan's patriarchate are given in the Ecclesiastical Chronicle of the Jacobite writer Bar Hebraeus (floruit 1280) and in the ecclesiastical histories of the Nestorian writers Mari ibn Suleiman (twelfth-century), ʿAmr (fourteenth-century) and Sliba (fourteenth-century)

== Yohannan's patriarchate ==
Bar Hebraeus devoted two paragraphs to Yohannan's patriarchate:

The caliph issued a decree that the bishops should be free to choose whomever they wished as their leader, and Yohannan bar ʿIsa was consecrated at Seleucia on the fifth feast day of the year 287 of the Arabs (AD 900/1). He was a man revered for his knowledge and continence. In his days the metropolitan Theodore of Beth Garmaï was detected in fornication and deposed.

The catholicus Yohannan, after he had fulfilled his office for nearly five years, died in the year 292 [AD 904/5]. The story goes that he never took a bribe for the laying on of hands, and led a life of very great poverty. When he was about to die he said to his disciple, 'Behold, I have 260 zuzae of silver hidden away in such and such a place, which were bequeathed to me by my parents. Take them, and spend them on my funeral.

== See also ==
- List of patriarchs of the Church of the East

== Notes ==
Church of the East titles
Preceded by Yohannan III (893–899)	Catholicos-Patriarch of the East (900–905)	Succeeded by Abraham III (906–937)
