= Sabrisho I =

Sabrisho I (also Sabr-Ishu, Syriac for "hope in Jesus") was Patriarch of the Church of the East from 596 to 604, during the rule of King Khosrow II.

Sabrisho was born in 525 in Beth Garmai (near modern-day Kirkuk) in the Sasanian Empire. He was the son of a shepherd from the mountainous region of Shahrizur. His priest sent him to the School of Nisibis.

He was a hermit for many years and was a strong supporter of the monastic way of life. He was influential in integrating monasticism into the church. Another strong supporter of monasticism at the time was Abraham the Great of Kashkar.

He became Bishop of Lashom in 577 and carried out several missionary journeys. He was involved in the conversion of King Nuʿman III of Ḥirta of the Lakhmid kingdom.

Shortly after his appointment in 596, he started to convene a synod which was held in 598 in Seleucia-Ctesiphon where he anathematized the opponents of Theodore of Mopsuestia. Other conflicts during Sabrisho's tenure included that with Henana of Adiabene, who he excommunicated from the Church.

== Death and legacy ==
Sabrisho died in 604. There was a subsequent power struggle over the election of a new Patriarch, between the King, his wife Shirin, and the Synod (council) of bishops. The following year, Gregory of Seleucia-Ctesiphon took on the patriarchy.

Sabrisho's friend, Petros the Solitary wrote a memoir entitled "The Life of Sabrisho". It focused on miracles which Sabrisho was said to have carried out. Several miracles were also mentioned in notices in the Chronicle of Siirt (LXV-LXXII; PO 13.4, 154-78).

== Sources ==
- Chabot, Jean-Baptiste (1902). Synodicon orientale ou recueil de synodes nestoriens (PDF). Paris: Imprimerie Nationale.
- Wigram, W. A. (2004). An introduction to the history of the Assyrian Church, or, The Church of the Sassanid Persian Empire, 100–640 A.D. Gorgias Press. ISBN 1-59333-103-7.
- Baum, Wilhelm; Winkler, Dietmar W. (2003). The Church of the East: a concise history. Routledge. ISBN 978-0-415-29770-7.
- Walker, Joel Thomas (2006). The Legend of Mar Qardagh: Narrative and Christian Heroism in Late Antique Iraq. University of California Press. ISBN 978-0-520-93219-7.
- Sebastian P. Brock, “Sabrishoʿ I,” in Sabrishoʿ I, edited by Sebastian P. Brock, Aaron M. Butts, George A. Kiraz and Lucas Van Rompay.

Church of the East titles
Preceded by Ishoʿyahb I (582–595)	Catholicos-Patriarch of the East (596–604)	Succeeded by Gregory (605–609)
