= Ishoʿsabran =

Ishoʿsabran (Syriac: ܝܫܘܥܣܒܪܢ, Īšōʿsawrān), born Mahanosh, was a Persian Zoroastrian convert to Christianity who was martyred in the Sasanian Empire in 620 or 621. His life and martyrdom is recounted in one of the Persian martyr acts, the History of Ishoʿsabran. He is commemorated as a saint in the East Syriac churches on the third Friday after Annunciation.

At least four persons named Ishoʿsabran appear in East Syriac liturgical calendars, but only the martyr of 620/1 has a written hagiography. This was written by Ishoʿyahb of Adiabene before he became patriarch in 649 based on the testimony of Ishoʿsabran's surviving companion, Ishoʿzka. In the words of Jean Maurice Fiey, this biography is "as much from a literary point of view as a critical point of view, one of the best productions of one of the best East Syriac writers."

Born Mahanosh in the town of Qūr in Adiabene and raised Zoroastrian, he was converted by the words of his already-converted wife and the local priest, Ishoʿ Raḥme. He was baptised in the monastery of Beth Shakūḥ, east of Arbela, and took the name Ishoʿsabran. At first he practised his new religion secretly. After publicising his conversion, he was denounced by his brother to a local judge—since conversion from Zoroastrianism was illegal—and imprisoned in Ḥazza, capital of Adiabene.

Ishoʿsabran was on trial before the governor when a fellow Christian, Yazdīn, a minister of Shah Khosrow II, happened to be passing through and procured his release. His brother died not long after his release and he decided to leave his wife and become a mendicant in the mountains. He returned to Qūr to study the Bible under Ishoʿzka, son of the priest Ishoʿ Raḥme. He intended to provoke his own persecution in the hopes of securing martyrdom.

Ishoʿsabran founded a monastery two miles outside Qūr, which became renowned for its charity. Against the wishes of his own monks, he took in twenty foundlings. He also distributed food to the poor and widows during a famine. After almost two years, he was arrested at the instigation of the Magoi and taken under military escort to Arbela.

Ishoʿsabran remained in prison for fifteen years, during which time the Monophysites attempted, unsuccessfully, to convert him to their creed. With several other notables from Beth Garmai, he was brought before the shah. A further intervention by Yazdīn was unsuccessful. After six days of interrogation, he was tortured. With the others, he was brought to Beth Warda and crucified.
