= Abdisho I =

Patriarch of the Church of the East

ʿAbdishoʿ I was Patriarch of the Church of the East from 963 to 986.

== Sources ==
Brief accounts of ʿAbdishoʿ's patriarchate are given in the Ecclesiastical Chronicle of the Jacobite writer Bar Hebraeus (floruit 1280) and in the ecclesiastical histories of the Nestorian writers Mari (twelfth-century), ʿAmr (fourteenth-century) and Sliba (fourteenth-century). Modern assessments of his reign can be found in Jean-Maurice Fiey's Chrétiens syriaques sous les Abbassides and David Wilmshurst's The Martyred Church.

== ʿAbdishoʿ's patriarchate ==
The following account of ʿAbdishoʿ's patriarchate is given by Bar Hebraeus:

Then a certain doctor, a secular priest, Pethion by name, went to the governor, and promised him 300,000 nummi of silver to be appointed catholicus. On hearing the news, the bishops fled and hid, so that they should not be forced to consecrate him. Then the lawyers interceded between the bishops and the governor, and promised to hand over 130,000 zuze from the patriarchal cell provided that they were allowed to elect a leader of their own choice. It is said that after the death of Emmanuel 70,000 gold dinars were found in his cell, and 6,000 silver zuze. But the lawyers did not know that such a sum of money had come to light, but instead took the precious objects from the churches, and the gold and silver cups, and broke them and sold them so that they could offer the proceeds to the governor. Then, by common consent, lots were drawn. The lots bore the names of four candidates, and the name of ʿAbdishoʿ, the bishop of Maʿaltha, was drawn. He was accepted by all, and although he did his best to refuse the honour and only consented reluctantly, he was consecrated in the year 352 [AD 963/4]. He was well versed in canon law and was instructed in dialectic by Bar Nasiha, the disciple of the most devout Mushe Bar Kepha, one of our men. Up to the time of that catholicus, during the service of the eucharist, the celebrants at the altar recited one sentence from the creed while the congregation responded with another sentence. They did the same thing with the prayer 'Our father, which art in Heaven'. He now instructed that everybody should recite the words at the same time, as we do.

== Ecclesiastical administration ==
ʿAbdishoʿ was a pious and well-read man, but would have been a better patriarch if he had demanded the highest standards of conduct from his officials. Some of his assistants enriched themselves during his reign from the ample funds left in the treasury by Emmanuel I. Their peculation mostly went unchecked by the patriarch, though ʿAbdishoʿ dismissed one or two men in his entourage whose misdeeds were too scandalous to escape notice. He also did not always discipline his bishops as they deserved. He deposed the arrogant bishop Abraham of Kashkar, who was ruling his diocese with a high hand, but later relented and sent him back to his former diocese of Hamadan. In other respects, however, he was a sound administrator. According to Mari, he consecrated a total of 134 metropolitans and bishops (Bar Hebraeus misquoted this number as 104). At the time of his death only three archdioceses (Merv, Mosul and Erbil, and Basra) did not have an archbishop; and the vacancy in the archdiocese of Basra, due to the death of its metropolitan ʿAbd al-Masih, occurred only two days before ʿAbdishoʿ's own death.

ʿAbdishoʿ attempted to revive the faltering Nestorian mission to China. His interest in this mission was recorded by the tenth-century Nestorian writer Abu'lfaraj, who met a Nestorian monk in Baghdad in 987 who had recently returned from China:

In the year 377 of the Arabs [AD 987], in the Christian quarter behind the church, I met a monk from Najran who seven years before had been sent by the catholicus to China with five other clergy to set in order the affairs of the Christian church. I saw a man still young and of a pleasant appearance, but he spoke little and did not open his mouth except to answer the questions which were put to him. I asked him for some information about his journey, and he told me that Christianity was just extinct in China; the native Christians had perished in one way or another; the church which they had used had been destroyed; and there was only one Christian left in the land. The monk, having found no one remaining to whom his ministry could be of any use, returned more quickly than he went.

== See also ==
- List of patriarchs of the Church of the East

== Notes ==
Church of the East titles
Preceded by Israel (961)	Catholicos-Patriarch of the East (963–986)	Succeeded by Mari (987–999)
