= Gregory of Seleucia-Ctesiphon =

Gregory of Prat was patriarch of the Church of the East from 605 to 609. His name is included in the traditional list of patriarchs of the Church of the East.

Before he was patriarch, he was a teacher of biblical interpretation at the School of Seleucia-Ctesiphon.

== Sources ==
Brief accounts of Gregory's patriarchate are given in the Ecclesiastical Chronicle of the Jacobite writer Bar Hebraeus (floruit 1280) and in the ecclesiastical histories of the Nestorian writers Mari (twelfth-century), ʿAmr (fourteenth-century) and Sliba (fourteenth-century). A lengthier and more circumstantial account is given in the Chronicle of Seert, an anonymous ninth-century Nestorian history.

== Gregory's patriarchate ==
The following account of Gregory's patriarchate is given by Bar Hebraeus:

In the year 915 [AD 604], after hearing that his father-in-law Maurice had been killed by the Greeks, Khusro Abroes broke the peace, and setting out against Dara besieged it for nine months and captured it. The catholicus Sabrishoʿ accompanied him, and died there after sitting for eight years. He was succeeded by Gregory of Kashkar, a doctor of the church of Seleucia, who was given over to avarice and luxury. He had a number of disciples of poor repute, on account of whom he was held in contempt not only by his own people but also by the Persian nobles. After he had fulfilled his office for four years, he died and was buried at Seleucia. Then the Persians put his disciples to the question until they handed back all the money that had been amassed by their master. At that time there flourished the orthodox Christian Gabriel, a doctor of the king Khusro Abroes, who was a native of the town of Shigar, who was called Airir Astabad on account of the great honour he enjoyed with the king. He was a bitter enemy of the Nestorians, and accused and overthrew their leaders. After Gregory the Nestorians remained for the space of eighteen years without a leader.

== See also ==
- List of patriarchs of the Church of the East

== Notes ==
Church of the East titles
Preceded by Sabrishoʿ I (596–604)	Catholicos-Patriarch of the East (605–609)	Succeeded by Vacant (609–628); Ishoʿyahb II (628–645)
