= Ishoyahb I =

Ishoʿyahb I of Arzun was patriarch of the Assyrian Church of the East from 582 to 595. After his death, he was buried in the Monastery of Hind the Younger.

== Sources ==
Brief accounts of Ishoʿyahb's patriarchate are given in the Ecclesiastical Chronicle of the Jacobite writer Bar Hebraeus (floruit 1280) and in the ecclesiastical histories of the Nestorian writers Mari (twelfth-century), ʿAmr (fourteenth-century) and Sliba (fourteenth-century). A lengthier and more circumstantial account is given in the Chronicle of Seert, an anonymous ninth-century Nestorian history.

== Ishoʿyahb's patriarchate ==
The following account of Ishoʿyahb's patriarchate is given by Bar Hebraeus:

The catholicus Ezekiel, who had called his bishops blind and later became blind himself, lived in the time of Hormizd, son of Khusro. He died two years after he went blind, and was succeeded by Ishoʿyahb, bishop of Arzun. This man, after fulfilling his office for fifteen years, set out to visit Nuʿman, king of the Christian Arabs, to try to detach him to the Nestorian faith, as he belonged to our church, but was unable to change his mind. He died in the tents of the Maʿadaye, and was buried in the monastery of Hind, the daughter of Nuʿman, who dressed him in a monk’s robe. In his days two monasteries were built, Deir Saʿid near Mosul and the monastery of Mansur in the region of the Ninevites. After Hormizd had reigned for two years, the Persians attacked him and killed him. His son Khusro Abroes ascended the throne after him, in the year 901 [AD 589–90], and reigned for eighteen years. During his reign the catholicus Ishoʿyahb died, and was succeeded by Sabrishoʿ, who was a native of the village of Pirozabad in the country of Beth Garmai.

== See also ==
- Ishoyahb II (d. 645)
- Ishoyahb III (d. 659)
- List of patriarchs of the Church of the East

== Notes ==
Church of the East titles
| Preceded by Ezekiel (570–581) | Catholicos-Patriarch of the East (582–595) | Succeeded by Sabrishoʿ I (596–604) |
