= Israel of Seleucia-Ctesiphon =

Patriarch of the Church of the East in 961

Israel was Patriarch of the Church of the East in 961.

== Sources ==
Brief accounts of Israel's short patriarchate are given in the Ecclesiastical Chronicle of the Jacobite writer Bar Hebraeus (floruit 1280) and in the ecclesiastical histories of the Nestorian writers Mari (twelfth-century), ʿAmr (fourteenth-century) and Sliba (fourteenth-century).

== Israel's patriarchate ==
The following account of Israel's patriarchate is given by Bar Hebraeus:

Before this same year, namely the year 350 of the Arabs [AD 961/2], Israel, the successor of Emmanuel, was ordained catholicus, who had earlier been bishop of Kashkar. For after the death of Emmanuel several people favoured Gabriel, the metropolitan of Fars, but the bishops did not accept him, saying, 'He is the brother of a man who recently embraced Islam and denied his faith. It would bring great shame on us if we appointed as our chief the brother of such a man.' And so everybody gave their consent to this Israel, and consecrated him catholicus at Seleucia. He was venerable and chaste, but a doddering old man, and he died one hundred and six days after his consecration, at the age of ninety.

== See also ==
- List of patriarchs of the Church of the East

== Notes ==
Church of the East titles
Preceded by Emmanuel I (937–960)	Catholicos-Patriarch of the East (961)	Succeeded by ʿAbdishoʿ I (963–986)
