= Emmanuel I of Seleucia-Ctesiphon =

Emmanuel I was Patriarch of the Church of the East from 937 to 960.

== Emmanuel's patriarchate ==
The following account of Emmanuel's patriarchate is given by Bar Hebraeus:

After the death of the catholicus Abraham, the bishops gathered together and conspired to consecrate one of their own number catholicus, whoever it might be, rather than some outside monk. But Abu'lhasan, the counsellor of the caliph al-Radi, sent a messenger to summon a certain Emmanuel, from the monastery of Abba Joseph in the town of Balad. The bishops, forced to waive their rights, consecrated Emmanuel at Seleucia in the year 326 [AD 937/8]. Emmanuel was famed for his chastity and continence, reverenced and feared by his people, and strikingly tall and handsome; but he was also avaricious and proud, and had a sharp tongue. The catholicus Emmanuel fulfilled his office for twenty-three years and died on the fourth day of nisan [April] in the year 349 of the Arabs [AD 960].

== Sources ==
Brief accounts of Emmanuel's patriarchate are given in the Ecclesiastical Chronicle of the Jacobite writer Bar Hebraeus (floruit 1280) and in the ecclesiastical histories of the Nestorian writers Mari (twelfth-century), ʿAmr (fourteenth-century) and Sliba (fourteenth-century).

== See also ==
- List of patriarchs of the Church of the East

== Notes ==
Church of the East titles
Preceded by Abraham III (906–937)	Catholicos-Patriarch of the East (937–960)	Succeeded by Israel (961)
