= Ishoyahb III =

Patriarch of the Church of the East from 649 to 659

Ishoʿyahb III of Adiabene was Patriarch of the Church of the East from 649 to 659. He is known for writing more than one hundred letters that have survived preserving information about Christian life under the earliest period of Islamic rule, including several letters he sent to the Christians of Beth Qatraye in the eastern Arabian Peninsula.

== Early career ==
Ishoʿyahb was the son of a wealthy Persian Christian named Bastomagh, of Kuphlana in Adiabene, who was a frequent visitor to the monastery of Beth ʿAbe. He was educated at the School of Nisibis, became bishop of Nineveh, and was afterwards appointed metropolitan of Adiabene. As metropolitan of Adiabene he hindered the Jacobites from building a church in Mosul, despite the fact that they were supported by all the weight and influence of the Tagritians from Tikrit. Bar Hebraeus declares that he bribed right and left to effect this. He was one of the members of the delegation of the Church of the East which met the Roman emperor Heraclius in Aleppo in 630, and took away a very costly and beautiful casket, containing relics of the apostles, from a church at Antioch. Many argue the casket was stolen similar to how relics were often stolen during the Crusades. He donated the casket to the monastery of Beth ʿAbe.

== Ishoyahb's patriarchate ==
On Maremmeh's death in 647, the Church of the East in what is now Iraq elevated Ishoʿyahb to the Catholicate. However Metropolitan Shemʿon of Rev Ardashir did not recognise this.

Ishoʿyahb maintained good relations with the Arabs – whom he called variously Tayy, Muhajirs, and Hanifs – but never did heal the schism in his own Church.

Ishoʿyahb died in 659.

== Writings ==
Ishoʿyahb wrote a Refutation of Opinions on behalf of John, Metropolitan of Beth Lapat, several other tracts and sermons, some hymns, a vita of the martyr Isho-sabhran, and an exhortation to novices. He is also known for making substantial improvements to the liturgy of the Church for the daily office and for various sacraments. The Chronicle of Seert, Pt.1.1, pg.85 (295), also credits him with choosing the three eucharistic anaphoras that are currently in use in the Assyrian Church of the East.

== Relationship with East Arabian Christians ==
The letters of Isho'yahb offer unique insights into relations between the patriarchate of the Church of the East and the Christian populations of Eastern Arabia in the middle of the seventh century, shortly after the early Muslim conquests. His letters suggest a period of tense relations, with Isho'yahb offended by the theological associations between these Christians and the new faith of the invading Arabs. Isho'yahb wrote:

The heretics are deceiving you [when they say] there happens what happens by order of the Arabs, which is certainly not the case. For the tayyaye mhaggre (Muhajir Arabs) do not aid those who say that God, Lord of all, suffered and died. And if by chance they do help them for whatever reason, you can inform the mhaggre (Mujahirs) and persuade them of this matter as it should be, if you care about it at all. So perform all things wisely, my brothers; give unto Caesar what is Caesar's, and to God what is God's.

Another major issue demonstrated by the letters of Isho'yahb regards the issue of the conversion of Christians in Oman to the new faith in order to avoid a poll tax (jizya) that would take away half of their wealth:

You alone of all the peoples of the earth have become estranged from every one of them. And because of this estrangement from all these, the influence of the present error came to prevail with ease among you. For the one who has seduced you and uprooted your churches was first seen among us in the region of Radhan, where the pagans are more numerous than the Christians. Yet, due to the praiseworthy conduct of the Christians, the pagans were not led astray by him. Rather he was driven out from there in disgrace; not only did he not uproot the churches, but he himself was extirpated. However, your region of Fars received him, pagans and Christians, and he did with them as he willed, the pagans consenting and obedient, the Christians inactive and silent. As for the Arabs, to whom God has at this time given rule (shultana) over the world, you know well how they act towards us. Not only do they not oppose Christianity, but they praise our faith, honour the priests and saints of our Lord, and give aid to the churches and monasteries. Why then do your Mazonaye [Omanis] reject their faith on a pretext of theirs? And this when the Mazonaye themselves admit that the Arabs have not compelled them to abandon their faith, but only asked them to give up half of their possessions in order to keep their faith. Yet they forsook their faith, which is forever, and retained the half of their wealth, which is for a short time.

== Sources ==
Brief accounts of Ishoʿyahb's patriarchate are given in the Ecclesiastical Chronicle of the Jacobite writer Bar Hebraeus (thirteenth-century), and the ecclesiastical histories of the Church of the East writers Mari (twelfth-century), ʿAmr (fourteenth-century) and Sliba (fourteenth-century). There are also the works he penned himself.

== Translations ==
- Bcheiry, Iskandar. An Early Christian Reaction to Islam: Išū‘yahb III and the Muslim Arabs, Gorgias Press, 2019.

== See also ==
- Adiabene (East Syrian Ecclesiastical Province)
- East Syriac Rite
- List of patriarchs of the Church of the East

== Citations ==
=== Sources ===
- Abbeloos, J. B., and Lamy, T. J., Bar Hebraeus, Chronicon Ecclesiasticum (3 vols, Paris, 1877)
- Assemani, J. A., De Catholicis seu Patriarchis Chaldaeorum et Nestorianorum (Rome, 1775)
- Brooks, E. W., Eliae Metropolitae Nisibeni Opus Chronologicum (Rome, 1910)
- Gismondi, H., Maris, Amri, et Salibae: De Patriarchis Nestorianorum Commentaria I: Amri et Salibae Textus (Rome, 1896)
- Gismondi, H., Maris, Amri, et Salibae: De Patriarchis Nestorianorum Commentaria II: Maris textus arabicus et versio Latina (Rome, 1899)
- Wigram, W. A. (2004). An introduction to the history of the Assyrian Church, or, The Church of the Sassanid Persian Empire, 100–640 A.D. Gorgias Press. ISBN 1-59333-103-7.
- Winkler, Dietmar W., Die Christologie des ostsyrischen Katholikos Ishoyahb III. von Adiabene (580-659). In: Studia Patristica 35 (2001) 516–526.

Church of the East titles
Preceded by Maremmeh (646–649)	Catholicos-Patriarch of the East (649–659)	Succeeded by Giwargis I (661–680)
