= Joseph of Seleucia-Ctesiphon =

Patriarch of the Church of the East from 552 to 567

Joseph was Patriarch of the Church of the East from 552 to 567. He was immensely unpopular, and was eventually deposed by his bishops. He was notorious for having invented much of the early history of the Church of the East. Despite his deposition, his name is included in the traditional list of patriarchs of the Church of the East.

== Sources ==
Brief accounts of Joseph's reign are given in the Ecclesiastical Chronicle of the Jacobite writer Bar Hebraeus (floruit 1280) and in the ecclesiastical histories of the Nestorian writers Mari (twelfth-century), ʿAmr (fourteenth-century) and Sliba (fourteenth-century). His life is also covered in the Chronicle of Seert.

Modern assessments of his reign can be found in Baum and Winkler's Church of the East and David Wilmshurst's The Martyred Church.

== Joseph's patriarchate ==
The following account of Joseph's reign is given by Bar Hebraeus:

In the year 603 of the Greeks [AD 552] Aba I was succeeded by Joseph, the doctor of king Chosroes, who was a proud and avaricious man. Whenever a simple and rude man came to visit him, he would order his deacons to tie him to a manger and place a bridle on his head as though he were an ass. The bishops gathered together and deposed him, but from fear of the king they did not consecrate another man in his place until Joseph died, three years after his deposition.

== See also ==
- List of patriarchs of the Church of the East

== Notes ==
Church of the East titles
Preceded by Aba I (540–552)	Catholicos-Patriarch of the East (552–567)	Succeeded by Ezekiel (570–581)
