= Ezekiel of Seleucia-Ctesiphon =

Ezekiel was patriarch of the Church of the East from 570 to 581. He is principally remembered in the popular tradition for having called his bishops 'the blind leading the blind', an act of presumption for which he was punished by becoming blind himself.

== Ezekiel's patriarchate ==
Ezekiel's birthplace is not known, but like most of the sixth-century Nestorian patriarchs he was probably a native of northern Iraq. He was appointed bishop of Zabe (Arabic: al-Zawabi), a diocese in the ecclesiastical Province of the Patriarch, by the patriarch Joseph (552–67).

He assumed the position of patriarch of the Church of the East in 570, succeeding his deposed predecessor Joseph, who had recently died, and remained in office for eleven years. Despite initial opposition to his election, he quickly gained acceptance through his pragmatic policies. Rather than causing disruption by replacing officials appointed by Joseph, he confirmed all priests and deacons ordained during his predecessor's tenure. However, his efforts to manage the bishops were less successful, especially in light of a severe plague that had struck Mesopotamia towards the end of Joseph's rule. The Persian authorities struggled to cope with the high mortality rate, resulting in bodies remaining unburied in the streets. In Seleucia-Ctesiphon, as recounted by the eighth-century historian Bar Sahde of Kirkuk, the ousted patriarch Joseph had led a group of gravediggers to clear the corpses, demonstrating courage and selflessness that even his critics begrudgingly acknowledged. During Ezekiel's reign, the metropolitans of Adiabene and Beth Garmai endeavored to uplift the spirits of their congregations amidst the ongoing devastation of the plague. They ordered services of penitence and intercession to be held in all the churches under their jurisdiction, as the Ninevites had supposedly done in the days of the prophet Jonah. The 'Rogation of the Ninevites', as this service was called, is still observed every year by the Church of the East. To Ezekiel, however, a service of penitence was an empty gesture, and he angrily observed that his bishops were no better than 'the blind leading the blind'. Two years before his death Ezekiel himself went blind, a misfortune widely held to have been a divine judgement on him for his presumption.

At this period there was a considerable Nestorian Christian presence in east Arabia, a region known in Syriac as Beth Qatraye. According to the Chronicle of Seert, Ezekiel visited Bahrain and Yamama and brought back pearls for the Sasanian king Khosrau I. Khosrau's interest in the condition of the local pearl fisheries was doubtless an indication of their economic importance in the sixth century.

== Sources for Ezekiel's patriarchate ==
Accounts of Ezekiel's reign can be found in several Nestorian ecclesiastical histories, including the anonymous ninth-century Chronicle of Seert and the later histories attributed to Mari (twelfth-century), ʿAmr (fourteenth-century) and Sliba (fourteenth-century). Ezekiel is also the subject of a brief notice in the Ecclesiastical Chronicle of the Jacobite writer Bar Hebraeus (floruit 1280). The acts of a synod held by Ezekiel in 576 have also survived, and have been published by J. B. Chabot in his Synodicon Orientale, a classic collection of the synods of the Church of the East.

Modern assessments of Ezekiel's reign can be found in Wigram's An Introduction to the History of the Assyrian Church, Baum and Winkler's The Church of the East and Wilmshurst's The Martyred Church.

=== The Chronicle of Seert ===
The following detailed account of Ezekiel's reign is given in the Chronicle of Seert, probably written in the second half of the ninth century:

This father was a disciple of the catholicus Mar Aba and the bishop of al-Zawabi. After the death of Joseph, who had been stripped of the dignity of catholicus, the fathers met to choose a man to replace him on the patriarchal throne.

The choice fell on the doctor Ishai, but was opposed by Paul, metropolitan of Nisibis, and other fathers. Their preference was for Ezekiel, the disciple of Mar Aba and bishop of al-Zawabi, whom they had chosen when they had assembled to depose Joseph from his priestly dignity, and who was also loved and esteemed by the king Khusro Anushirwan, who had earlier sent him to Bahrain and Yamama to bring back pearls. The archdeacon Marozi, surnamed Naurozi, informed the king of this choice and begged him to authorise it. On his authorisation, the fathers gathered and consecrated him patriarch at al-Madaʿin. Skilled in secular affairs and versed in the sciences, he ran affairs very well and pleased everybody, even those who were against him at the time of Joseph's deposition. Indulgent towards the priests and deacons ordained by Joseph, he contented himself with assembling them in front of the altar and reciting over them the propitiatory prayers, without requiring them to be ordained for a second time.

In the forty-fifth year of the king Khusro he convoked the fathers and established thirty-six canons relating to ecclesiastical discipline. He made a voyage to the Mountain in Khusro's retinue, then he acted in a blameworthy manner towards the fathers, to whom he behaved with arrogance.

This father Ezekiel, in punishment for having mocked many people who had the slightest flaw in their eyes, such as whiteness and swelling, and for having called the virtuous and brave fathers blind, was himself struck by Christ with blindness, whose bitterness he had to taste for two years. He died in the third year of the king Hormizd, son of Anushirwan. Some say that he held the throne for eleven years, others for twenty years. Some say that he was taken to Hira and buried there, others that he was buried in al-Madaʿin.

=== Mari ibn Suleiman ===
The following account of Ezekiel's reign is given by the twelfth-century historian Mari ibn Suleiman. Although it shares some common elements with the account given in the Chronicle of Seert, it also contains new material:

The patriarch Ezekiel was the disciple of Mar Aba, and he was elected patriarch to succeed Joseph after various disputes among the fathers concerning the teacher Mari, who lived in al-Madaʿin. The king favoured Ezekiel, and readily gave his consent to his election. He restored good order in the Church. He did not degrade Joseph's priests from their rank, but corrected them sternly. Many men believed that Mar Aba had acted with great folly, because he had chosen a baker, who was now bishop of Zabe. Shortly afterwards he convened a synod and founded thirty-nine canons, but soon afterwards he treated the bishops harshly. When he left in the train of Khusro for Nisibis, its metropolitan Bakos gave the patriarch a very honourable welcome, and even at his suggestion praised him in a speech he gave to the people, exhorting them to show filial respect to him. Ezekiel assumed that he was trying to flatter him, and resolved to rid himself of him when he returned. But shortly afterwards, before Ezekiel returned from the siege of Dara, Bakos made his peace with Christ and departed to God. At that time many teachers flourished in Nisibis, including Ishoʿyahb, Abraham the son of Haddad, and Hnana, who had eight hundred disciples. Ezekiel was in the habit of making fun of anyone he saw who had a defect in his eyes, but was now himself afflicted with a flux of the humours of the eye. He died after ruling for eleven years, and was buried either in al-Hira or, as others say, in al-Madaʿin.

Anushirwan died after ravaging Raqqa and many regions and Caesarea, in revenge for the devastation that the Romans had wrought in many provinces in his own dominions while he was distracted in repelling his enemies. He was succeeded by his son Hormizd, who treated the Christians with great consideration, and used to tell the magi, whenever they consulted him about any matter, that his throne did not stand only upon two legs, and that he also wanted the Christian people to live in peace and quiet, as 'that is more to my advantage.' He used to flatter them immoderately, and held the patriarch Ezekiel in great honour.

=== Bar Hebraeus ===
The following brief account of Ezekiel's reign is given by Bar Hebraeus, and is probably derived from the longer account preserved in the Chronicle of Seert:

Joseph was succeeded by Ezekiel, the disciple of the catholicus Aba and the nephew of the catholicus Paul (indeed, the husband of his daughter). He was a favourite of the king, and was so puffed up by this that he called his bishops 'the blind leading the blind'. But he himself was made blind before the end of his life.

== See also ==
- List of patriarchs of the Church of the East

== Notes ==
Church of the East titles
Preceded by Joseph (552–567)	Catholicos-Patriarch of the East (570–581)	Succeeded by Ishoʿyahb I (582–595)
