= Hulwan (East Syriac ecclesiastical province) =

The Metropolitanate of Hulwan was an East Syriac metropolitan province of the Church of the East between the eighth and twelfth centuries, with suffragan dioceses for Dinawar, Hamadan, Nihawand and al-Kuj (perhaps Karaj d'Abu Dulaf). The city of Hulwan (Syriac: ܚܘܠܘܐܢ) was one of the chief towns in the western Iranian province of Media. The metropolitanate of Hulwan was ranked among the 'exterior provinces', so called to distinguish them from the province of the patriarch and the five core Mesopotamian 'interior' provinces.

== Background ==
A number of East Syriac dioceses in Iran existed by the beginning of the fifth century, but they were not grouped into a metropolitan province in 410. After establishing five metropolitan provinces in Mesopotamia, Canon XXI of the synod of Isaac provided that 'the bishops of the more remote dioceses of Fars, of the Islands, of Beth Madaye (Media), of Beth Raziqaye (Rai) and of the country of Abrshahr (Tus) must accept the definition established in this council at a later date'.

By the end of the fifth century, there were at least three East Syriac dioceses in the Sassanian province of Media in western Iran. Hamadan (ancient Ecbatana) was the chief city of Media, and the Syriac name Beth Madaye (Media) was regularly used to refer to the East Syriac diocese of Hamadan as well as to the region as a whole. Although no East Syriac bishops of Beth Madaye are attested before 457, the reference to Beth Madaye in Canon XXI of the synod of Isaac probably indicates that the diocese of Hamadan was already in existence in 410. Bishops of Beth Madaye were present at most of the synods held between 486 and 605. Two other dioceses in western Iran, Beth Lashpar (Hulwan) and Masabadan, seem also to have been established in the fifth century. A bishop of 'the deportation of Beth Lashpar' was present at the synod of Dadishoʿ in 424, and bishops of Beth Lashpar also attended the later synods of the fifth and sixth centuries. Bishops of the nearby locality of Masabadan were present at the synod of Joseph in 554 and the synod of Ezekiel in 576.

Because of its origins in a mass deportation of Roman Christians, the diocese of Hulwan was probably more populous than that of Hamadan during the late Sassanian period. Media became a metropolitan province of the Church of the East during the reign of Ishoʿyahb II (628–45), and its metropolitans sat at Hulwan rather than Hamadan.

In 893 Eliya of Damascus listed Hulwan as a metropolitan province, with suffragan dioceses for Dinawar (al-Dinur), Hamadan, Nihawand and al-Kuj. 'Al-Kuj' cannot be readily localised, and has been tentatively identified with Karaj d'Abu Dulaf. Little is known about these suffragan dioceses, except for isolated references to bishops of Dinawar and Nihawand, and by the end of the twelfth century Hulwan and Hamadan were probably the only surviving centres of East Syriac Christianity in Media. Around the beginning of the thirteenth century, the metropolitan see of Hulwan was transferred to Hamadan, in consequence of the decline in Hulwan's importance. The last-known bishop of Hulwan and Hamadan, Yohannan, flourished during the reign of Eliya III (1176–90). Hamadan was sacked in 1220, and during the reign of Yahballaha III was also on more than one occasion the scene of anti-Christian riots. It is possible that its Christian population at the end of the thirteenth century was small indeed, and it is not known whether it was still the seat of a metropolitan bishop.

== The diocese of Hulwan ==
The bishop 'Hatita' 'of the deportation of Beth Lashpar' was among the signatories of the acts of the synod of Dadishoʿ in 424.

The bishop Brikhoï 'of Beth Lashpar' was one of eleven named bishops listed in the acts of the same synod as having been reproved at the synods of Isaac in 410 and Yahballaha I in 420.

The bishop Nuh 'of Beth Lashpar' was among the signatories of the acts of the synod of Acacius in 486.

The priest and secretary Ahaï was among the signatories of the acts of the synod of Babaï in 497, on behalf of the bishop Ahron 'of Beth Lashpar'.

The bishop Pusaï 'of Hulwan' adhered by letter to the acts of the synod of Joseph in 554.

The bishop Shubha 'of Beth Lashpar' was among the signatories of the acts of the synod of Ezekiel in 576.

The bishop Bar Nun 'of Hulwan' was among the signatories of the acts of the synod of Ishoʿyahb I in 585.

The bishop Bar Hadbshabba 'of Hulwan' was among the signatories of the acts of the synod of Gregory in 605.

The metropolitan Surin of Hulwan was abusively consecrated patriarch in 751/2.

The bishop Stephen was appointed for Hulwan by the patriarch Sargis (860–72).

The bishop Ishoʿyahb of Susa was appointed metropolitan of Hulwan by the patriarch Yohannan III immediately after his consecration on 15 July 893.

The metropolitan Yohannan of Hulwan was one of three metropolitans who were present at the consecration of the patriarch Israel in 961.

The metropolitan Yohannan of Hulwan, probably the same man, was present at the consecration of the patriarch Mari on 10 April 987.

The metropolitan Ishoʿdad of Hulwan was one of only two metropolitans present at the consecration of the patriarch Emmanuel I on 23 February 938, because 'many metropolitans objected'.

The metropolitan Mari 'of Fars', originally bishop of Dinawar, was metropolitan 'in the city of Hulwan' when Elijah of Nisibis completed his Chronography in 1018/19.

The metropolitan ʿAbd al-Masih 'of Hulwan and Rai' was present at the consecration of the patriarch ʿAbdishoʿ II in 1074, and died at an unknown date during his reign.

The metropolitan Yohannan of Hulwan was present at the consecration of the patriarch Makkikha I in 1092.

The metropolitan Yohannan of Hulwan, possibly the same man, was present at the consecration of the patriarch Eliya II in 1111.

The patriarch Eliya II (1111–32) transferred an unnamed metropolitan of Hulwan to the metropolitan diocese of Egypt.

== The diocese of Beth Madaye (Hamadan) ==
The bishop Abraham of 'Madaï' was among the signatories of the acts of the synod of Acacius in 486.

The bishop Babaï of 'Madaï' was among the signatories of the acts of the synod of Babaï in 497.

The bishop Acacius of 'Madaï' was among the signatories of the acts of the synod of Joseph in 554, and the bishop 'Auban' 'of Hamadan' (possibly a different diocese) adhered by letter to the acts of the same synod.

The bishop Yazdkwast of Beth Madaye was among the signatories of the acts of the synod of Gregory in 605.

The bishop Abraham of Hamadan was transferred to the diocese of Kashkar by the patriarch ʿAbdishoʿ I (963–86). He was deposed and excommunicated for seven years for misbehaviour, and was eventually restored to his old diocese at the request of the Nestorians of Hamadan.

== The diocese of Masabadan ==
The bishop Denha of Masabadan was among the signatories of the acts of the synod of Joseph in 554.

The bishop Shubha of Masabadan was among the signatories of the acts of the synod of Ezekiel in 576.

== The diocese of Dinawar ==
The bishop Mari 'of Fars', metropolitan of Hulwan when Eliya Bar Shinaya completed his Chronography in 1018/19, was formerly bishop of Dinawar.

== The diocese of Nihawand ==
The bishop Sabrishoʿ of Nihawand was among the signatories of the acts of the synod of Timothy I in 790.
