= Bar Sawma of Seleucia-Ctesiphon =

Patriarch of the Church of the East from 1134 to 1136

Mar Bar Sawma
- Patriarch of the Church of the East
- Church: Church of the East
- See: Seleucia-Ctesiphon
- Installed: 1134
- Term ended: 1136
- Predecessor: Eliya II
- Successor: Abdisho III

Personal details
- Died: 1136

Bar Sawma was Patriarch of the Church of the East from 1134 to 1136.

== Sources ==
Brief accounts of Bar Sawma's patriarchate are given in the Ecclesiastical Chronicle of the Jacobite writer Bar Hebraeus (fl. 1280) and in the ecclesiastical histories of the fourteenth-century Nestorian writers ʿAmr ibn Mattā and Ṣalībā ibn Yūḥannā.

== Bar Sawma's patriarchate ==
The following account of Bar Sawma's patriarchate is given by Bar Hebraeus (who erroneously placed him after the patriarch Makkikha I instead of Eliya II):

Bar Sawma was consecrated catholicus of the Nestorians on Sunday, 4 ab [August] in the year 528 of the Arabs [AD 1134] in succession to Makkikha bar Shlemun. This Bar Sawma lived a life of bitterness, on account of the heavy burdens that were laid upon him, and was constantly praying for a quick and early death. His prayers were answered, for after fulfilling his office for only one year and five months, he died on the eleventh day of the former kanun [December] in the year 533 of the Arabs [AD 1136].

== See also ==
- List of patriarchs of the Church of the East

== Notes ==
Church of the East titles
Preceded by Eliya II (1111–1132)	Catholicos-Patriarch of the East (1134–1136)	Succeeded by Vacant (1136–1139) ʿAbdishoʿ III (1139–1148)
