= Ishoyahb V =

Patriarch of the Church of the East from 1149 to 1175

Mar Ishoʿyahb V
- Patriarch of the Church of the East
- Church: Church of the East
- See: Seleucia-Ctesiphon
- Installed: 1149
- Term ended: 25 May 1175
- Predecessor: Abdisho III
- Successor: Eliya III
- Other post: Bishop of Hirta

Personal details
- Born: Ishoʿyahb Baladi
- Died: 25 May 1175

Ishoʿyahb V Baladi was Patriarch of the Church of the East from 1149 to 1175.

== Sources ==
Brief accounts of Ishoʿyahb's patriarchate are given in the Ecclesiastical Chronicle of the Jacobite writer Bar Hebraeus (fl. 1280) and in the ecclesiastical histories of the fourteenth-century Nestorian writers ʿAmr ibn Mattā and Ṣalībā ibn Yūḥannā.

== Ishoyahb's patriarchate ==
The following account of Ishoʿyahb's patriarchate is given by Bar Hebraeus:

Then Ishoʿyahb, an old and chaste man from Balad, who had formerly been bishop of Hirta, was made catholicus, for he was chosen by a certain famous doctor named Abu Mansur, son of a wise scribe. He was consecrated on the second Sunday of the Dedication of the Church, in the year 542 [AD 1147], and after he had fulfilled his office for twenty-eight years, he died on the night of the second Sunday after Ascension, on the twenty-fifth day of iyyar [May], in the year 570 of the Arabs [AD 1174]. He was succeeded by Eliya III, known as Abu Halim.

== See also ==
- List of patriarchs of the Church of the East

== Notes ==
Church of the East titles
| Preceded by ʿAbdishoʿ III (1139–1148) | Catholicos-Patriarch of the East (1149–1175) | Succeeded by Eliya III (1176–1190) |
