= Abdisho III =

Patriarch of the Church of the East from 1139 to 1148

Mar ʾAbdishoʾ III
- Patriarch of the Church of the East
- Church: Church of the East
- See: Seleucia-Ctesiphon
- Installed: 1139
- Term ended: 1148
- Predecessor: Bar Sawma
- Successor: Ishoyahb V

Personal details
- Born: ʾAbdishoʾ bar Moqli
- Died: 1148

ʾAbdishoʾ III bar Moqli was Patriarch of the Church of the East from 1139 to 1148.

== Sources ==
Brief accounts of Abdisho's patriarchate are given in the ecclesiastical history of the Nestorian writer Mari ibn Suleiman (fl. 1140), in the Ecclesiastical Chronicle of the Jacobite writer Bar Hebraeus (fl. 1280), and in the histories of the fourteenth-century Nestorian writers ʿAmr ibn Mattā and Ṣalībā ibn Yūḥannā.

== Abdisho's patriarchate ==
The following account of Abdisho's patriarchate is given by Bar Hebraeus:

Bar Sawma was succeeded by ʾAbdishoʾ Bar Moqli, of Mosul, an old man of a fine appearance. He was summoned to the caliph's palace after the election, and after he was crowned with the mitre and seated upon a mule, he progressed as far as the church of the third ward with one of the noblemen of the palace, and there dismounted. He conducted his patriarchate ably for nine years, and was then struck down by an apoplexy. He was consecrated on a Sunday, the tenth day of the latter teshrin [November] in the year 533 of the Arabs [AD 1139], and died on the third day of the latter teshrin in the year 541 of the same era [AD 1147].

A charter of protection granted to Abdisho III in 1139 by the caliph al-Muqtafi was published in 1926 by the Assyrian scholar Alphonse Mingana. In 1142 Abdisho was able to reconcile with the Syriac Orthodox Church Maphrian Dionysius, increasing the unity within Syriac Christianity.

== See also ==
- List of patriarchs of the Church of the East

Church of the East titles
Vacant Title last held by Bar Sawma (1134–1136)	Catholicos-Patriarch of the East (1139–1148)	Succeeded by Ishoʿyahb V (1149–1175)
