= Book of the Tower =

The Book of the Tower is the title of two Nestorian Christian works:

- Kitāb al-Majdal of Mari ibn Suleiman (12th century)
- Kitāb al-Majdal of Amr ibn Matta (14th century)
