= Makkikha I =

Mar Makkikha I
- Patriarch of the Church of the East
- Church: Church of the East
- See: Seleucia-Ctesiphon
- Installed: 1092
- Term ended: 1110
- Predecessor: Abdisho II
- Successor: Eliya II
- Other posts: Bishop of Tirhan; Metropolitan of Mosul and Hazza

Personal details
- Died: 1110

Ordination history of Makkikha I
History
Episcopal consecration
- Consecrated by: Sabrisho III (bishop); Abdisho II (metropolitan)

Makkikha I was Patriarch of the Church of the East from 1092 to 1110.

== Sources ==
Brief accounts of Makkikha's patriarchate are given in the Ecclesiastical Chronicle of the Jacobite writer Bar Hebraeus (fl. 1280) and in the ecclesiastical histories of the fourteenth-century Nestorian writers ʿAmr ibn Mattā and Ṣalībā ibn Yūḥannā. A more substantial account is given by the twelfth-century historian Mari. Modern assessments of his reign can be found in Jean-Maurice Fiey's Chrétiens syriaques sous les Abbassides and David Wilmshurst's The Martyred Church.

== Makkikha's patriarchate ==
The following account of Makkikha's early life and election to the patriarchate is given by Mari:

The patriarch Mar Makkikha (may God remember us in his prayers). This blessed and most pious father was from Baghdad, where he was brought up and educated in the school, and thereafter he began to cultivate continence, chastity and justice, and he also studied the arts of medicine for a while. He was ordained a priest in the church of our lady Mart Maryam in ʾAqaba (peace be upon her memory), and went there every day without wages or emolument. Then, as he progressed in sanctity, the patriarch Mar Sabrishoʾ appointed him bishop of Tirhan, and he governed this diocese for nearly twenty years, administering his flock excellently. He used to expound to them in Arabic the readings from the Old and the New Testament during the services. The Holy Spirit elevated him from grade to grade, and he was summoned by the patriarch Mar ʾAbdishoʾ and appointed metropolitan of Mosul and Hazza. He ruled his flock like the best of shepherds, and although he was a poor man he accepted no gifts from those whom he consecrated bishops. At length, when the patriarchal throne was deprived of its ruler and shepherd, this blessed father was appointed patriarch by the unanimous vote of the electors.

== See also ==
- List of patriarchs of the Church of the East

== Notes ==
Church of the East titles
Preceded by ʿAbdishoʿ II (1074–1090)	Catholicos-Patriarch of the East (1092–1110)	Succeeded by Eliya II (1111–1132)
