= Patriarchate of Seleucia-Ctesiphon =

Patriarchate of Seleucia-Ctesiphon may refer to:

- the office of the Patriarch of the Church of the East
- the Patriarchal Province of Seleucia-Ctesiphon, an ecclesiastical province of which the patriarch was metropolitan
