= Eliya I of Seleucia-Ctesiphon =

Mar Eliya I
- Patriarch of the Church of the East
- Church: Church of the East
- See: Seleucia-Ctesiphon
- Installed: 1028
- Term ended: 1049
- Predecessor: Ishoyahb IV
- Successor: Yohannan VII
- Other post: Bishop of Tirhan

Personal details
- Died: 1049
- Buried: Greek Palace, Baghdad

Eliya I (Syriac: ܐܠܝܐ) was Patriarch of the Church of the East from 1028 to 1049. He is also known as the author of an early grammar of Syriac written around the year 1000.

== Sources ==
Brief accounts of Eliya's patriarchate are given in the Ecclesiastical Chronicle of the Jacobite writer Bar Hebraeus (fl. 1280) and in the ecclesiastical histories of the Nestorian writers Mari (twelfth-century), ʿAmr ibn Mattā and Ṣalībā ibn Yūḥannā (fourteenth-century). A modern assessment of his reign can be found in David Wilmshurst's The Martyred Church.

== Eliya's patriarchate ==
The following account of Eliya's patriarchate is given by Bar Hebraeus:

He [Ishoʿyahb IV] was succeeded by Eliya I, formerly bishop of Tirhan, a man of advanced age and a learned doctor. He introduced the rite of genuflection on the holy Sunday of Pentecost, which the Nestorians previously did not observe. At the end of his life he was afflicted by a paralysis of his limbs and was confined to bed. He was consecrated on the third Sunday of the Apostles, on the seventh day of the third month of the Arabs in the year 419 [AD 1028/9] in the Greek Palace in Baghdad. His election was conducted by the drawing of lots. He died after fulfilling his office for twenty-one years, and was buried in the Greek Palace on the Sunday after Ascension, on the seventh day of iyyar [May] in the year 440 of the Arabs [AD 1048/9].

His secretary was the famous polymath Ibn al-Tayyib.

== See also ==
- List of patriarchs of the Church of the East

== Bibliography ==
- Abbeloos, J. B., and Lamy, T. J., Bar Hebraeus, Chronicon Ecclesiasticum (3 vols, Paris, 1877)
- Assemani, J. A., De Catholicis seu Patriarchis Chaldaeorum et Nestorianorum (Rome, 1775)
- Brooks, E. W., Eliae Metropolitae Nisibeni Opus Chronologicum (Rome, 1910)
- Gismondi, H., Maris, Amri, et Salibae: De Patriarchis Nestorianorum Commentaria I: Amri et Salibae Textus (Rome, 1896)
- Gismondi, H., Maris, Amri, et Salibae: De Patriarchis Nestorianorum Commentaria II: Maris textus arabicus et versio Latina (Rome, 1899)
- Wilmshurst, David (2011). The martyred Church: A History of the Church of the East. London: East & West Publishing Limited. ISBN 978-1-907318-04-7.

Church of the East titles
Preceded by Ishoʿyahb IV (1020–1025); Vacant (1025–1028)	Catholicos-Patriarch of the East (1028–1049)	Succeeded by Yohannan VII (1049–1057)
