= Tirhan (East Syriac diocese) =

English

The Diocese of Tirhan was an East Syriac diocese of the Church of the East, within the central ecclesiastical Province of the Patriarch. The diocese is attested between the sixth and fourteenth centuries.

== History ==
The Tirhan district lay to the southwest of Beth Garmai, and included the triangle of land between the Jabal Hamrin (known to the Nestorians as the mountain of Uruk) and the Tigris and Diyala rivers. Its chief town was Gbiltha. The diocese of Tirhan was probably included in the Province of the Patriarch instead of the province of Beth Garmai because Seleucia-Ctesiphon was closer to Gbiltha than Kirkuk (the metropolitan seat of Beth Garmai), and could be conveniently reached by water.

The bishop Sliba-zkha of Tirhan, who flourished during the reign of the patriarch Yaʿqob II (753–73), secured permission from the Jacobite authorities for the construction of a Nestorian church in Tagrit, in return for the restoration to the Jacobites of a church in Nisibis that had earlier been confiscated by the Nestorians.

== Bishops of Tirhan ==
The bishop Bar Nun of Tirhan was among the signatories of the acts of the synod of Aba I in 544.

The bishop Abraham of Tirhan was among the signatories of the acts of the synod of Ishoʿyahb I in 585.

The bishop Piroz of Tirhan was among the signatories of the acts of the synod of Gregory in 605.

The bishop Sargis of Tirhan was among the signatories of the acts of the synod of Dairin in 676.

The bishop Pethion of Tirhan was appointed by the patriarch Sliba-zkha (714–28). He was elected patriarch in 731.

The bishop Sliba-zkha of Tirhan flourished during the reign of the patriarch Yaʿqob II (753–73). He is first mentioned in 753, when he was imprisoned along with Yaʿqob during the brief reign of the anti-patriarch Surin. After his release he 'began to restore the churches in Tirhan', and also won permission from the Jacobite authorities for the construction of a Nestorian church in Tagrit, in return for the restoration to the Jacobites of the church of Mar Domitius in Nisibis. This agreement, which required the consent of the Jacobite maphrian Paul of Tagrit and the Nestorian metropolitan Cyprian of Nisibis, must have been concluded no later than 757, the date of Paul's death.

The bishop Sliba-zkha of Tirhan, almost certainly the same man, was among the signatories of the acts of the synod of Timothy I in 790.

The patriarch Sargis (860–72) appointed his disciple Qayyoma bishop of Tirhan, and later appointed him metropolitan of Nisibis, replacing him as bishop of Tirhan with the teacher Yohannan.

The future patriarch Eliya I (1028–49) was bishop of Tirhan when Eliya Bar Shinaya completed his Chronography in 1018/19, and was commended by him as 'a profound and experienced student of church doctrine and the art of rhetoric'.

The bishop Makkikha, son of Shlemun, of Tirhan, was consecrated by the patriarch Sabrishoʿ III shortly after his consecration in 1063/4. He was present at the consecration of the patriarch ʿAbdishoʿ II in 1074. He was consecrated metropolitan of Mosul by ʿAbdishoʿ II in 1085, following the death of the metropolitan Yahballaha of Mosul, and became patriarch in 1092 on ʿAbdishoʿ's death.

The bishop ʿAbdishoʿ of Tirhan was present at the consecration of the patriarch Makkikha I in 1092.

The bishop Narsai of Tirhan was present at the consecration of the patriarch Sabrishoʿ IV in 1222.

The bishop and archdeacon Ishoʿyahb of 'al-Hazira', a town to the south of Samarra which Fiey argued was then the seat of the bishops of Tirhan, was present at the consecration of the patriarch Makkikha II in 1257.

The bishop and archdeacon Emmanuel of Tirhan was present at the consecration of the patriarch Denha I in 1265.

The bishop and archdeacon Brikhishoʿ of Tirhan was present at the consecration of the patriarch Yahballaha III in 1281.

The bishop Shemʿon of Tirhan was present at the consecration of the patriarch Timothy II in 1318.

== Topographical survey ==
Shahdost of Tirhan was a noted Nestorian author, probably of the seventh or eighth century, who wrote a polemical work 'on the reasons for the separation between the Easterners and the Westerners'. Shahdost is included in the famous list of Nestorian authors compiled at the start of the fourteenth century by the metropolitan ʿAbdishoʿ bar Brikha of Nisibis.

Gbiltha, described by Thomas of Marga as 'an orthodox [i.e. Nestorian] town in the district of Tirhan', was the birthplace of Quriaqos, the Nestorian bishop of Balad c. 800, and of Rabban Babai, famous as a teacher and builder of schools in the early decades of the eighth century.

The Nestorian patriarch Sliba-zkha (714–28) was a native of Karka d'Piroz or Karkani (as the town was called in the thirteenth century) in the Tirhan district.

Tagrit, the seat of the Jacobite maphrians since the seventh century, had a small Nestorian community, first mentioned around the middle of the eighth century. In 757 or a little earlier the Jacobite authorities granted the Nestorians permission to build a church in Tagrit in return for the restoration of the church of Mar Domitius in Nisibis, a Jacobite church confiscated by the Nestorians several decades earlier. Construction of the Nestorian church began in 767, on a site by the Tigris adjacent to the city's outer wall, and the church was still in existence towards the end of the thirteenth century, when it was remarked upon by Bar Hebraeus.

The patriarch Makkikha I (1092–1110), who was earlier bishop of Tirhan, is said to have performed a miracle to rid the Tirhan district of a lion that was infesting the countryside around Harba and ʿAlth. He also cursed a Moslem who had taken stones from a Christian church in Samarra to build a mosque, and his curse resulted in the offender's death seven days later.
