= Hulwan =

Ancient Iranian town near present-day Sarpol-e Zahab

- Location within Iran
- 34°27′54″N 45°51′18″E
- Location: Iran
- Region: Kermanshah Province

Iran National Heritage List
- Official name: Hulwan
- Type: Settlement
- Designated: 1931
- Reference no.: 33
- Conservation organization: Cultural Heritage, Handicrafts and Tourism Organization of Iran

Hulwan (Persian: حلوان) was an ancient town on the Zagros Mountains in western Iran, located on the entrance of the Paytak Pass, nowadays identified with the town of Sarpol-e Zahab.

== History ==
Later Arab tradition, as recorded by al-Tabari, considered the town a Sasanian foundation dating to Kavadh I (reigned 488–496, 498–531), but it is far more ancient: it was known since Assyrian times as Khalmanu, when it lay on the border between Babylonia and Media. To the Seleucids, it was known as Chala (Greek: Χάλα) and was the capital of the district of Chalonitis (Χαλωνῖτις). According to Diodorus Siculus, the name derives from the settlement of Greek captives from Boeotia by Xerxes, who founded the town of Celonae or Kelonai (Κέλωναι).

Under the Sasanian Empire, the district of Hulwan was called [Khusraw] Shad Peroz ("the joy of Khusraw the victorious"), and the city itself probably Peroz Kavad ("victorious Kavad"). After the Muslim conquest of Persia, the words were Arabicized and became known as: [Khusraw] Shadh Firuz and Firuz Qubadh. Although like the rest of Media it belonged to the quarter (kust) of the North, under Khosrau II (r. 590–628) it was included in the quarter of the West, along with Mesopotamia, as the Sasanian rulers began to use the Zagros Mountains as a summer retreat away from the capital of Ctesiphon on the Mesopotamian plain.

After the Battle of Qadisiyya in 636, the last Sasanian ruler, Yazdegerd III (r. 632–651), took refuge in Hulwan for a while during his flight from Ctesiphon. After another heavy defeat at the Battle of Jalula in 637, Yazdegerd left Hulwan for the eastern provinces of his realm, and the town fell into the hands of the pursuing Arabs under Jarir ibn Abdallah Bajali in 640. In the early 640s, the town was of strategic importance as a frontier post between the Mesopotamian lowlands and the still Sasanian-controlled Iranian plateau, and was garrisoned by troops, including Persian defectors (the Khamra), who were settled there under the Rashidun caliphs.

In the early Islamic period, until the 10th century, the town is described "as a flourishing town in a fertile district producing much fruit" (L. Lockhart). It was situated on the Khurasan Road, and was the first town of the Jibal province to be met travelling eastwards from Baghdad. Nevertheless, as in Sasanian times, it was fiscally tied to the Mesopotamian lowlands (the Sawad). Under Mu'awiya I (r. 661–680) it became the capital of western Jibal (Mah al-Kufa).

According to the 10th-century traveller Ibn Hawqal, the town was half the size of Dinavar, and its houses were built of both stone and bricks. Though the climate was hot, dates, pomegranates and figs grew abundantly. According to the 10th-century hudud al-'alam the town's figs were dried and widely exported, while al-Muqaddasi adds that the town was surrounded by a wall with eight gates, and included, alongside a mosque, a Jewish synagogue.

The town was also a metropolitan province of the Church of the East between the 8th and 12th centuries.

Around the turn of the 11th century, the town was governed by the semi-independent Annazid dynasty, until they were expelled by the Kakuyids. It was taken and burned by the Seljuq Turks in 1046, while an earthquake in 1049 completed the town's destruction. Although rebuilt, it never recovered its former prosperity, and is now the town of Sarpol-e Zahab.

== Sources ==
- Busse, Heribert (1975). "Iran under the Būyids". In R.N. Frye (ed.). The Cambridge History of Iran, Volume 4: From the Arab Invasion to the Saljuqs. Cambridge: Cambridge University Press. pp. 250–304. ISBN 9780521200936.
- Huart, Clément (2013) [1927]. Ancient Persia and Iranian Civilization. Routledge. ISBN 978-1136199806.
- Le Strange, Guy (1905). The Lands of the Eastern Caliphate: Mesopotamia, Persia, and Central Asia, from the Moslem Conquest to the Time of Timur. Cambridge: Cambridge University Press.
- Lockhart, L. (1986). "Ḥulwān". The Encyclopedia of Islam, New Edition, Volume III: H–Iram. Leiden, and New York: BRILL. pp. 571–572. ISBN 90-04-08118-6.
- Morony, Michael G. (2005). Iraq After the Muslim Conquest. Gorgias Press LLC. ISBN 1593333153.
- Zarrinkub, Abd al-Husain (1975). "The Arab conquest of Iran and its aftermath". In Frye, R. N.; Fisher, William Bayne; Gershevitch, Ilya; et al. (eds.). The Cambridge History of Iran, Volume 4: From the Arab Invasion to the Saljuqs. Cambridge: Cambridge University Press. pp. 1–56. ISBN 0-521-20093-8.
