= Sliba-zkha =

Șliba-zkha (Syriac, 'the Cross has conquered') was patriarch of the Church of the East from 714 to 728.

== Sources ==
Brief accounts of Sliba-zkha's patriarchate are given in the Ecclesiastical Chronicle of the Jacobite writer Barhebraeus (floruit 1280) and by the Church of the East works by Mari ibn Suleiman (twelfth century) and Amr ibn Matta (fourteenth century), and in the Martyrology of Rabban Sliba (fourteenth century). He is also mentioned in an unfavourable anecdote in Thomas of Marga's Book of Governors.

== Sliba-zkha's patriarchate ==
The following account of Sliba-zkha's patriarchate is given by Bar Hebraeus:

The catholicos Hnanishoʿ was succeeded by Sliba-zkha, who was consecrated at Seleucia. He was from Karka d'Piroz, which is today called Karkani, in the Tirhan region. He removed the name of Yohannan Garba ('the Leper') from the diptychs, reconsecrated the bishops consecrated by Garba, and put back the name of Hnanishoʿ, who had been oppressed by calumny, alongside those of the rest of the catholici. He died after fulfilling his office for fourteen years.

According to Abdisho bar Berika, Sliba-zkha established metropolitan provinces for Herat, Samarqand, India, and China.

== See also ==
- List of patriarchs of the Church of the East

== Notes ==
Church of the East titles
Preceded by Hnanishoʿ I (686–698); Vacant (698–714)	Catholicos-Patriarch of the East (714–728)	Succeeded by Pethion (731–740)
