= Sabrisho III =

Mar Sabrisho III
- Patriarch of the Church of the East
- Church: Church of the East
- See: Seleucia-Ctesiphon
- Installed: 1064
- Term ended: 1072
- Predecessor: Yohannan VII
- Successor: Abdisho II
- Other post: Bishop of Nishapur

Personal details
- Born: Sabrishoʿ Zanbur
- Died: 1072

Sabrishoʿ III Zanbur was Patriarch of the Church of the East from 1064 to 1072.

== Sources ==
Brief accounts of Sabrishoʿ's patriarchate are given in the Ecclesiastical Chronicle of the Jacobite writer Bar Hebraeus (fl. 1280) and in the ecclesiastical histories of the Nestorian writers Mari (twelfth-century), ʿAmr ibn Mattā and Ṣalībā ibn Yūḥannā (fourteenth-century).

== Sabrisho's patriarchate ==
The following account of Sabrishoʿ's patriarchate is given by Bar Hebraeus:

Yohannan VII was succeeded by ʿSabrisho Zanbur ('the wasp'), the bishop of Nishapur. His election was pushed through by force by Abu Saʿid the tax-collector of Ispahan, who compelled the bishops and obtained their agreement. Being anxious to gratify the metropolitan ʿAbdishoʿ of Nisibis, he introduced the custom of allowing the metropolitan of Nisibis to take part in the election of a patriarch. He was consecrated on a Sunday, on the third day of ab [August] in the year 1372 of the Greeks [AD 1061]. Shortly afterwards he was struck by an apoplexy and lost the use of his limbs. He fulfilled his office for ten years and died on the third day of nisan [April] in the year 1383 [AD 1072].

== See also ==
- List of patriarchs of the Church of the East

== Notes ==
Church of the East titles
Preceded by Yohannan VII (1049–1057); Vacant(1057–1064)	Catholicos-Patriarch of the East (1064–1072)	Succeeded by ʿAbdishoʿ II (1049–1057)
