= Eliya II of Seleucia-Ctesiphon =

Mar Eliya II
- Patriarch of the Church of the East
- Church: Church of the East
- See: Seleucia-Ctesiphon
- Installed: 1111
- Term ended: 1132
- Predecessor: Makkikha I
- Successor: Bar Sawma

Personal details
- Born: Eliya bar Moqli
- Died: 1132

Eliya II Bar Moqli (Syriac: ܐܠܝܐ) was Patriarch of the Church of the East from 1111 to 1132.

== Sources ==
Brief accounts of Eliya's patriarchate are given in the Ecclesiastical Chronicle of the Jacobite writer Bar Hebraeus (floruit 1280) and in the ecclesiastical histories of the fourteenth-century Nestorian writers ʿAmr and Sliba. A more substantial account is given by the twelfth-century historian Mari.

== See also ==
- List of patriarchs of the Church of the East

== Sources ==
- Abbeloos, J. B., and Lamy, T. J., Bar Hebraeus, Chronicon Ecclesiasticum (3 vols, Paris, 1877)
- Assemani, J. A., De Catholicis seu Patriarchis Chaldaeorum et Nestorianorum (Rome, 1775)
- Brooks, E. W., Eliae Metropolitae Nisibeni Opus Chronologicum (Rome, 1910)
- Gismondi, H., Maris, Amri, et Salibae: De Patriarchis Nestorianorum Commentaria I: Amri et Salibae Textus (Rome, 1896)
- Gismondi, H., Maris, Amri, et Salibae: De Patriarchis Nestorianorum Commentaria II: Maris textus arabicus et versio Latina (Rome, 1899)
- Wilmshurst, David (2011). The martyred Church: A History of the Church of the East. London: East & West Publishing Limited. ISBN 978-1-907318-04-7.

Church of the East titles
Preceded by Makkikha I (1092–1110)	Catholicos-Patriarch of the East (1111–1132)	Succeeded by Bar Sawma (1134–1136)
