= Eliya III of Seleucia-Ctesiphon =

Mar Eliya III
- Patriarch of the Church of the East
- Church: Church of the East
- See: Seleucia-Ctesiphon
- Installed: 1176
- Term ended: April 1190
- Predecessor: Ishoyahb V
- Successor: Yahballaha II
- Other post: Metropolitan of Nisibis

Personal details
- Born: Eliya Abu Halim
- Died: April 1190

Sainthood
- Feast day: 3rd Friday after Easter
- Venerated in: Assyrian Church of the East

Eliya III Abu Halim (Syriac: ܡܵܪܝ ܐܹܠܝܼܵܐ ܬܠܝܼܬ݂ܵܝܵܐ ܐܲܒܘܼ ܚܲܠܝܼܡ) was Patriarch of the Church of the East from 1176 to 1190.

== Biography ==
Eliya established the Metropolitan of Kashkar. Brief accounts of Eliya's patriarchate are given in the Ecclesiastical Chronicle of the Jacobite writer Bar Hebraeus (fl. 1280) and in the ecclesiastical histories of the fourteenth-century Nestorian writers ʿAmr and Sliba.

The following account of Eliya's patriarchate is given by Bar Hebraeus:

In the year 572 of the Arabs [AD 1175/6], on the Sunday of 'Come, let us adore him', namely the third Sunday after Epiphany, Eliya Abu Halim was consecrated catholicus of the Nestorians. This man composed Arabic homilies for Sunday feasts in admirable and polished language. He was a man of perfect stature, in the prime of life, modest and liberal, rich in ecclesiastical knowledge, and extremely well versed in the language of the Saracens, as is testified by his commentary in which he beautifully describes both the Jacobite and Nestorian feasts celebrated in the East. He was born in the city of Maiperqat, and was first consecrated a bishop, then metropolitan of Nisibis, and finally catholicus. He restored the ruins of the patriarchal cell and made them habitable again. After fulfilling his office for fifteen years he died on the night of the sixth feria, on the third day of nisan [April], in the year 586 of the Arabs [AD 1190], and was buried in Baghdad in the church of the third ward.

== See also ==
- List of patriarchs of the Church of the East

== Sources ==
- Abbeloos, J. B., and Lamy, T. J., Bar Hebraeus, Chronicon Ecclesiasticum (3 vols, Paris, 1877)
- Assemani, Giuseppe Luigi (1775). De catholicis seu patriarchis Chaldaeorum et Nestorianorum commentarius historico-chronologicus. Roma.
- Baum, Wilhelm; Winkler, Dietmar W. (2003). The Church of the East: a concise history. London & New York: Taylor & Francis.
- Brooks, E. W., Eliae Metropolitae Nisibeni Opus Chronologicum (Rome, 1910)
- Gismondi, H., Maris, Amri, et Salibae: De Patriarchis Nestorianorum Commentaria I: Amri et Salibae Textus (Rome, 1896)
- Gismondi, H., Maris, Amri, et Salibae: De Patriarchis Nestorianorum Commentaria II: Maris textus arabicus et versio Latina (Rome, 1899)
- Seleznyov, Nikolai N., Katolikos-Patriarh Tserkvi Vostoka Mar Iliya III i ego "Slovo na prazdnik Rozhdestva Hristova, in: Simvol 55 (Paris-Moscow, 2009): 389–395.
- Wilmshurst, David (2011). The martyred Church: A History of the Church of the East. London: East & West Publishing Limited.

Church of the East titles
Preceded by Ishoʿyahb V (1149–1175)	Catholicos-Patriarch of the East (1176–1190)	Succeeded by Yahballaha II (1190–1222)
