= Abdisho II =

Mar Abdisho II
- Patriarch of the Church of the East
- Church: Church of the East
- See: Seleucia-Ctesiphon
- Installed: 1074
- Term ended: 1090
- Predecessor: Sabrisho III
- Successor: Makkikha I
- Other post: Bishop of Nisibis

Personal details
- Born: ʿAbdishoʿ ibn al-ʿArid
- Died: 1090

ʿAbdishoʿ II ibn al-ʿArid was Patriarch of the Church of the East from 1074 to 1090.

== Life ==
Before his elevation to patriarch, ʿAbdishoʿ served as bishop of Nisibis (Nusaybin).

== See also ==
- List of patriarchs of the Church of the East

Church of the East titles
Preceded by Sabrisho III (1064–1072)	Catholicos-Patriarch of the East (1074–1090)	Succeeded by Makkikha I (1092–1110)
