= Patriarchal Province of Seleucia-Ctesiphon =

Ecclesiastical province of the Church of the East (5th–13th c.)

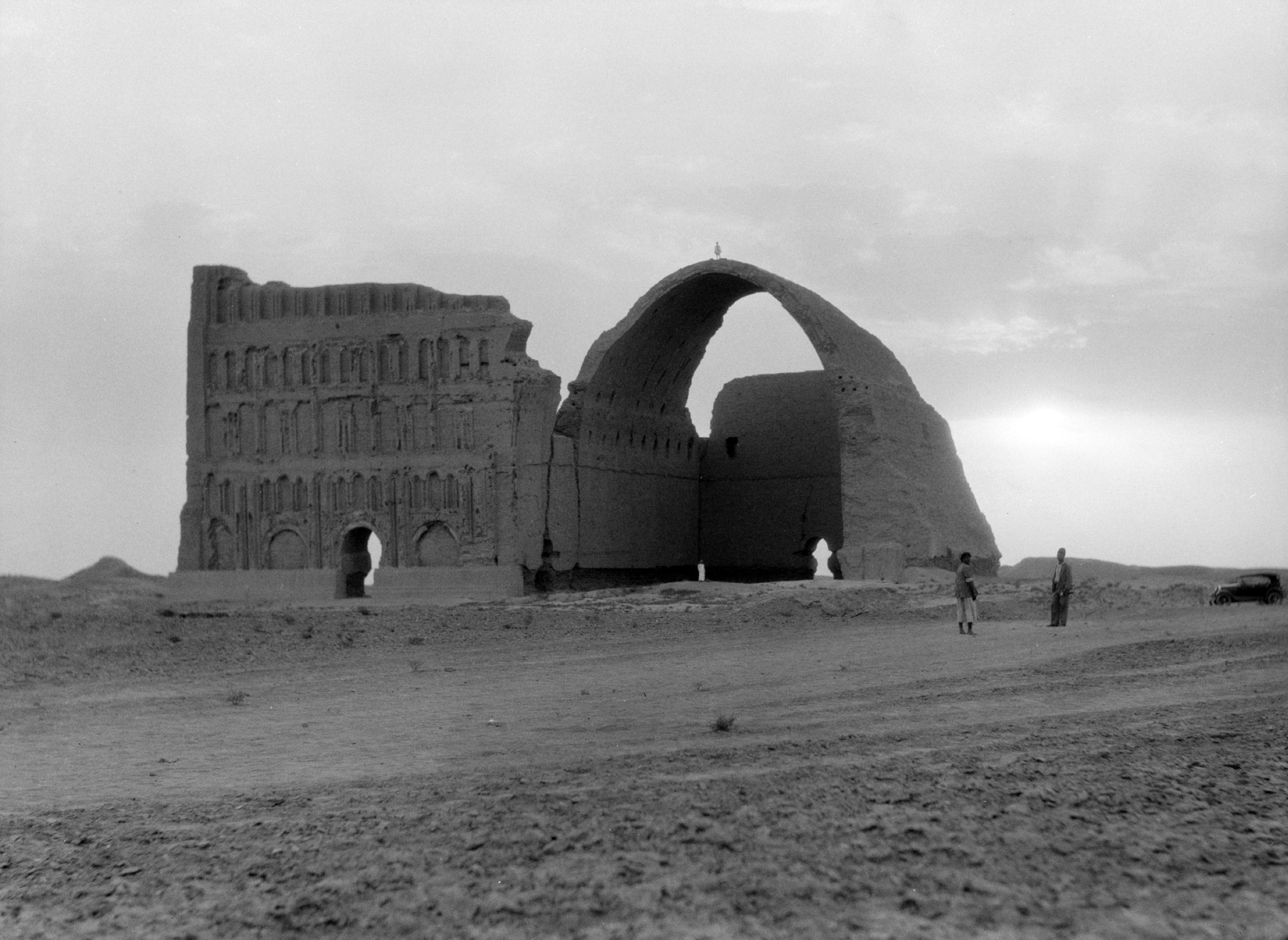
Taq Kasra, Sasanian ruins in Seleucia-Ctesiphon

The Patriarchal Province of Seleucia-Ctesiphon was an ecclesiastical province of the patriarch of the Church of the East. Its metropolitan see was in Seleucia-Ctesiphon, near Al-Mada’in in modern Iraq. It existed from the fifth to the thirteenth centuries. The province consisted of a number of dioceses in the region of Asoristan between Basra and Kirkuk which were placed under the patriarch's direct supervision at the synod of Yahballaha I in 420.

== Background ==
According to Eliya of Damascus, there were thirteen dioceses in the province of the patriarch in 893:

- Kashkar, al-Tirhan (Tirhan)
- Dair Hazql (an alternative name for al-Nuʿmaniya, the chief town in the diocese of Zabe)
- Al-Hira (Hirta)
- Al-Anbar (Piroz Shabur)
- Al-Sin (Shenna d'Beth Ramman)
- ʿUkbara
- A-Radhan
- Nifr
- Al-Qasra
- 'Ba Daraya
- Ba Kusaya' (Beth Daraye)
- ʿAbdasi (Nahargur)
- Al-Buwazikh (Konishabur or Beth Waziq)

Eight of these dioceses already existed in the Sasanian period, but the diocese of Beth Waziq is first mentioned in the second half of the seventh century, and the dioceses of ʿUkbara, Radhan, Nifr and Qasr were probably founded in the ninth century. The diocese of Nahargur was in the province of Maishan during the Sassanian period, and it is not known when or why it was transferred to the diocese of the patriarch. The first bishop of ʿUkbara whose name has been recorded, Hakima, was consecrated by the patriarch Sargis around 870, and bishops of Qasr, Radhan and Nifr are first mentioned in the tenth century. A bishop of 'Qasr and Nahrawan' became patriarch in 963, and then consecrated bishops for Radhan and for 'Nifr and Nil'. Eliya's list helps to confirm the impression given by the literary sources, that the East Syrian communities in Beth Aramaye were at their most prosperous in the tenth century.

A partial list of bishops present at the consecration of the patriarch Yohannan IV in 900 included several bishops from the province of the patriarch, including the bishops of Zabe and Beth Daraye and also the bishops Ishoʿzkha of 'the Gubeans', Hnanishoʿ of Delasar, Quriaqos of Meskene and Yohannan 'of the Jews'. The last four dioceses are not mentioned elsewhere and cannot be satisfactorily localised.

In the eleventh century decline began to set in. The diocese of Hirta (al-Hira) came to an end, and four other dioceses were combined into two: Nifr and al-Nil with Zabe (al-Zawabi and al-Nuʿmaniya), and Beth Waziq (al-Buwazikh) with Shenna d'Beth Ramman (al-Sin).

Three more dioceses ceased to exist in the twelfth century. The dioceses of Piroz Shabur (al-Anbar) and Qasr and Nahrawan are last mentioned in 1111, and the senior diocese of Kashkar in 1176. In 1139, at the consecration ceremony of the patriarch ʿAbdishoʿ III, a bishop from the province of Nisibis was required to proclaim the new patriarch's name, 'because all the bishops of the grand eparchy [Beth Aramaye] had died and their thrones were vacant; something which had never happened before'.

The trend of decline continued in the thirteenth century. The diocese of Zabe and Nil is last mentioned during the reign of Yahballaha II (1190–1222), and the diocese of ʿUkbara in 1222. Only three dioceses are known to have been still in existence at the end of the thirteenth century: Beth Waziq and Shenna, Beth Daron and (perhaps due to its sheltered position between the Tigris and the Jabal Hamrin) Tirhan. However, East Syrian communities may also have persisted in districts which no longer had bishops: a manuscript of 1276 was copied by a monk named Giwargis at the monastery of Mar Yonan 'on the Euphrates, near Piroz Shabur which is Anbar', nearly a century and a half after the last mention of a bishop of Anbar.

== Dioceses ==
=== Seleucia-Ctesiphon ===
The first bishop of Seleucia-Ctesiphon whose historical existence is not in doubt was Papa bar Aggai, who was consecrated around 280. At a turbulent synod convened at Seleucia-Ctesiphon in 315, Papa secured grudging recognition from the other Persian bishops of the primacy of the diocese of Seleucia-Ctesiphon.

=== Kashkar ===
According to legend, the diocese of Kashkar was the oldest diocese in Persia. It was said to have been founded by the apostle Mari in the first century, several decades before the establishment of a diocese in the Persian capital Seleucia-Ctesiphon. Although a first-century foundation date is highly unlikely, the diocese of Kashkar was certainly one of the oldest dioceses of the Church of the East. The antiquity of the diocese and its claim to an apostolic foundation were recognised at the synod of Isaac in 410, when it was ranked second after the patriarchal diocese of Seleucia-Ctesiphon and its bishop was appointed guardian of the patriarchal throne (natar kursya).

The earliest-known bishop of Kashkar was ʿAbdishoʿ, who was one of several Persian bishops who opposed the claim to precedence put forward by the bishop Papa of Seleucia-Ctesiphon in 315. The last-known bishop of Kashkar was Sabrishoʿ, who was transferred from the diocese of Qaimar to Kashkar by the patriarch Eliya III (1176–90). By 1222 the guardianship of the vacant patriarchal throne, for centuries a privilege of the bishops of Kashkar, was in the hands of the metropolitans of Beth Huzaye.

=== Hirta ===
The East Syrian diocese of Hirta (al-Hira, الحيرة) is first attested in 410, but may have been a fourth-century foundation. Its last-known bishop, Yohannan Bar Nazuk, became patriarch in 1012.

The bishop Hosea of Hirta was among the signatories of the acts of the synod of Isaac in 410.

The bishop Shemʿon of 'Hirta d'Tayyaye' ('Hirta of the Arabs') was among the signatories of the acts of the synod of Dadishoʿ in 424.

The bishop Shemʿon of Hirta was among the signatories of the acts of the synod of Acacius in 486.

The bishop Eliya of Hirta was among the signatories of the acts of the synod of Babaï in 497.

The bishop Joseph of Hirta was among the signatories of the acts of the synod of Ishoʿyahb I in 585.

The bishop Sabrishoʿ of Hirta flourished in the reign of the patriarch Gregory (605–9). He was a contemporary of the East Syrian monk Rabban Khudahwi, and helped him build the monastery of Beth Hale.

The bishop Sargis of Hirta was among the bishops present at the deathbed of the patriarch Ishoʿyahb III in 659.

The bishop Yohannan Zaroqa ('the Blue') of Hirta flourished during the last decade of the seventh century and the first four decades of the eighth century. In the patriarchal election of 731 he refused to stand himself, and transferred his support to the bishop Aba of Kashkar (the future patriarch Aba II). In 741 he arranged a welcome for the newly elected patriarch Aba II in Hirta.

The bishop Joel of Hirta was among the signatories of the acts of the synod of Timothy I in 790.

The bishop Hnanishoʿ Bar Saroshwai of Hirta flourished at the beginning of the ninth century. He was the author of a lost lexicon, whose contents were incorporated almost entire into the more famous tenth-century lexicon of Abu'l Hassan Bar Bahlul.

The bishop Joseph of al-Hira (Hirta) was appointed metropolitan of Maishan during the reign of the patriarch Mari (987–99).

The patriarch Yohannan VI Bar Nazuk was bishop of Hirta before his consecration as patriarch on 19 November 1012.

=== Zabe (al-Nuʿmaniya) ===
The bishop Miles of Zabe was among the signatories of the acts of the synod of Isaac in 410.

The bishop Zebida of Zabe was one of eleven named bishops listed in the acts of the synod of Dadishoʿ in 424 as having been reproved at the synods of Isaac in 410 and Yahballaha I in 420.

The secretary Shila was among the signatories of the acts of the synods of Acacius in 486 (as a deacon) and Babai in 497 (as a priest), on behalf of the bishop Mihrnarsai of Zabe.

The bishop Mirhnarse of Zabe was among the bishops who rallied to the patriarch Mar Aba I in 540 and signed his Pragmatic. He was also among the signatories of the acts of the synod of Mar Aba I in 544.

The bishop Ezekiel of Zabe (al-Zawabi) was appointed by the patriarch Joseph (552–67) and succeeded him as patriarch in 570.

The bishop Babai of Zabe was among the signatories of the acts of the synod of Ezekiel in 576.

The bishop Abraham of Zabe was among the signatories of the acts of the synod of Ishoʿyahb I in 585.

The bishop Gregory of Zabe was among the signatories of the acts of the synod of Timothy I in 790.

The bishop Shlemun of Zabe (al-Zawabi) was appointed metropolitan of Fars during the reign of the patriarch Mari (987–99).

The patriarch Yohannan IV was bishop of Zabe before his election and consecration as patriarch on 11 September 900, and on the day of his consecration he consecrated his disciple Abraham bishop of Zabe in his place.

=== Beth Daraye ===
The bishop 'Sasar' of Beth Daraye was among the signatories of the acts of the synod of Dadishoʿ in 424.

The bishop Qisa of 'Qoni' (identified by Fiey with the monastery of Qunni in Beth Daraye) was one of eleven named bishops listed in the acts of the synod of Dadishoʿ in 424 as having been reproved at the synods of Isaac in 410 and Yahballaha I in 420.

The bishop Yazdegerd of 'Darai' was among the signatories of the acts of the synod of Acacius in 486.

The secretary Marqos was among the signatories of the acts of the synod of Babai in 497, on behalf of the bishop Brikhishoʿ of Beth Daraye.

The bishop Marqos of Beth Daraye was among the signatories of the acts of the synod of Mar Aba I in 544.

The bishop Yohannan of Beth Daraye was among the signatories of the acts of the synod of Joseph in 554.

The bishop ʿAbda of Beth Daraye was among the signatories of the acts of the synod of Gregory in 605.

The bishop Daniel of Beth Daraye was among the signatories of the acts of the synod of Timothy I in 790.

The bishop Mikha'il of Beth Daraye was present at the consecration of the patriarch Yohannan IV in 900.

The bishop Shemʿon, metropolitan of Beth Garmaï when Elijah of Nisibis completed his Chronography in 1018/19, was originally bishop of Beth Daraye and later bishop of Kashkar.

An unnamed bishop of 'Ba Daraya and Ba Kusaya' was present at the consecration of the patriarch Eliya I in 1028.

=== Dasqarta d'Malka ===
The bishop Sharbil of Dasqarta d'Malka was one of eleven named bishops listed in the acts of the synod of Dadishoʿ in 424 as having been reproved at the synods of Isaac in 410 and Yahballaha I in 420.

=== Piroz Shabur (Anbar) ===
The bishop Mushe of Piroz Shabur was among the signatories of the acts of the synod of Acacius in 486.

The priest Yohannan was among the signatories of the acts of the synod of Babai in 497, on behalf of the bishop Shamaʿ of Piroz Shabur.

The bishop Shemʿon of Piroz Shabur was among the bishops who rallied to the patriarch Mar Aba I in 540 and signed his Pragmatic. He was also among the signatories of the acts of the synod of Joseph in 554. He was later arrested and imprisoned by Joseph, and eventually died in prison.

The bishop Marai of Piroz Shabur was among the signatories of the acts of the synod of Ezekiel in 576.

The bishop Shemʿon of Piroz Shabur was among the signatories of the acts of the synod of Gregory in 605.

The future patriarch Sliba-zkha (714–28) was appointed bishop of al-Anbar during the reign of the patriarch Hnanishoʿ I (686–700) and ejected by the anti-patriarch Yohannan Garba. He later became metropolitan of Mosul.

The bishop Yohannan of Piroz Shabur was among the signatories of the acts of the synod of Timothy I in 790.

The future patriarch Theodosius of Beth Garmai (853–8) was consecrated bishop 'of al-Anbar' by the patriarch Sabrishoʿ II (831–5), and later became metropolitan of ʿIlam.

The future patriarch Yohannan II Bar Narsai was appointed bishop of Piroz Shabur (Anbar) by the patriarch Sargis (860–72). He remained its bishop until his consecration as patriarch on 13 December 884.

In 921/2 the bishop Eliya of Piroz Shabur "confessed his sin before the patriarch Abraham and stated in a written confession that he had sinned and erred in holding that Our Lord had not eaten the bread which he blessed and broke and gave to the disciples on the day of the Passover".

The bishop Sabrishoʿ of Piroz Shabur (al-Anbar) was appointed metropolitan of ʿIlam during the reign of the patriarch Mari (987–99).

The bishop Eliya, metropolitan of Mosul (Athor) when Elijah of Nisibis completed his Chronography in 1018/9, was originally bishop of Piroz Shabur and later metropolitan of Damascus.

The bishop Mundhar of al-Anbar was present at the consecration of the patriarch Eliya I in 1028.

The bishop Mari ibn ʿAus of 'Radhan' was transferred to the diocese of Anbar by the patriarch Sabrishoʿ III shortly after his consecration in 1063/4. He was present at the consecration of the patriarch ʿAbdishoʿ II (1074–90) in 1074, and died at an unknown date during his reign.

=== Karme ===
The bishop Daniel of Karme was among the signatories of the acts of the synod of Acacius in 486, and his priest and secretary Aba signed the acts of the synod of Babai in 497 on his behalf.

=== Tirhan ===
The Nestorian diocese of Tirhan was founded in the sixth century, probably to counter the influence of the important Jacobite centre of Tagrit. The first-known bishop of Tirhan, Bar Nun, was among the signatories of the acts of the synod of Aba I in 544.

=== Shenna d'Beth Ramman ===
The bishop Yohannan 'of Shenna' was among the signatories of the acts of the synod of Ezekiel in 576.

The bishop Miles 'of Shenna' was among the signatories of the acts of the synod of Ishoʿyahb I in 585 and the agreement of Bar Qaiti in March 598.

The bishop Shabur 'of Shenna' was among the signatories of the acts of the synod of Gregory in 605.

The bishop Ishoʿyahb of Shenna, formerly a monk of the Great Monastery on Mount Izla, flourished during the reign of the patriarch Ishoʿyahb II of Gdala (628–45). He was the brother of ʿEnanishoʿ, the celebrated East Syrian writer who redacted the Book of Paradise.

The bishop David of Shenna, "a holy man and miracle-worker", died on 13 March 727.

The bishop Shubhalmaran 'of Shenna' was among the signatories of the acts of the synod of Timothy I in 790.

The monk Narsai of the monastery of Beth ʿAbe became bishop of Shenna at an unknown date in the second half of the eighth century or the first half of the ninth century.

An unnamed bishop of al-Sin (Shenna) was appointed metropolitan of Damascus by the patriarch Sargis (860–72), and replaced by the bishop Sabrishoʿ Sarq al-Lil.

The monk Makkikha, superior of the monastery of Beth ʿAbe, was elected bishop of Shenna by its East Syrian community in 900 after visiting Baghdad to attend the consecration of the patriarch Yohannan IV.

The bishop Yohannan al-Sin ("of Shenna") was appointed metropolitan of Fars by the patriarch Mari (987–99). The eleventh-century author Elijah of Nisibis was ordained a priest in the monastery of Mar Shemʿon in the district of Shenna on Sunday 15 September 994 by the bishop and future patriarch Yohannan of Shenna, probably the same man.

The patriarch Sabrishoʿ III consecrated a monk named Stephen bishop of al-Sin (Shenna), 'to which he added Bawazikh (Beth Waziq)', shortly after his consecration in 1064. Stephen was present as 'bishop of al-Sin and Bawazikh' at the consecration of the patriarch ʿAbdishoʿ II in 1074.

Stephen seems to have died in 1074, as he was replaced as bishop of Shenna and Beth Waziq by ʿAbd al-Masih, brother of the metropolitan of Maishan, who was consecrated by the patriarch ʿAbdishoʿ II shortly after his own consecration in 1074. ʿAbd al-Masih abdicated shortly afterwards and was replaced by Abu ʿAli Tahir of the Greek Palace.

=== ʿUkbara ===
The bishop Hakima was appointed for ʿUkbara by the patriarch Sargis (860–72).

The bishop Yohannan, formerly bishop of Harran, was bishop of ʿUkbara when Elijah of Nisibis completed his Chronography in 1018/19. He was commended by Elijah for his scholarship.

An unnamed bishop of ʿUkbara was present at the consecration of the patriarch Eliya I in 1028.

Mari Ibn Shemʿona, a priest of the Greek palace, was consecrated bishop of ʿUkbara by the patriarch ʿAbdishoʿ II shortly after his own consecration in 1074.

The bishop Sabrishoʿ of ʿUkbara was present as natar kursya at the consecration of the patriarch Eliya II in 1111, and was also present at the consecration of the patriarch Bar Sawma in 1134.

The bishop Eliya of ʿUkbara was present at the consecration of the patriarch Sabrishoʿ IV in 1222.

=== Beth Daron (Radhan) ===
The bishop Giwargis of Radhan was one of three bishops who went into hiding in 961 in protest against the election of the patriarch Israel.

An unnamed bishop of Radhan was present at the consecration of the patriarch Eliya I in 1028.

The bishop Maranʿemmeh of Beth Daron was present at the consecration of the patriarch Makkikha II in 1257.

The bishop Maranʿemmeh 'of Badhial', probably the same man, was present at the consecration of the patriarch Denha I in 1265.

The bishop Sliba-zkha of Beth Daron was present at the consecration of the patriarch Yahballaha III in 1281.

The bishop Isaac of Beth Daron was present at the consecration of the patriarch Timothy II in 1318.

=== Qasr and Nahrawan ===
The diocese of Qasr is first mentioned in connection with an incident that took place in the reign of Sliba-zkha (714–28), when the caliph ʿAbd al-Malik visited 'the church of the throne that is called the "White Fortress" (al-qasr al-abyad)'.

The future patriarch Ishoʿyahb IV (1020–5) was consecrated bishop of Qasr and Nahrawan during the reign of the patriarch ʿAbdishoʿ I (963–86) and remained its bishop until he was elected patriarch in 1020. He wrote an account of an incident that took place at Qasr in ʿAbdishoʿ's reign, during an inundation of the Tigris, which was later quoted at length by the historian Mari.

Yohannan Abu Nasr Ibn al-Targhal, a scribe in the Greek palace, was consecrated bishop of 'al-Qasr and al-Nahrawan' by the patriarch Eliya I in al-Madaʿin immediately after his consecration in 1028. He was appointed patriarch in 1049.

Naʿaman Ibn Saʿada was consecrated bishop of 'al-Qasr' at an unknown date during the reign of the patriarch ʿAbdishoʿ II (1074–90).

The bishop Yohannan of Qasr and Nahrawan was present at the consecration of the patriarch Eliya II in 1111.

=== Nifr, Nil and al-Nuʿmaniya ===
The bishop Eliya of al-Nuʿmaniya guarded the patriarchal throne after the death of the patriarch Yohannan V in 1011, as the diocese of Kashkar was vacant at the time.

An unnamed bishop of Nil was present at the consecration of the patriarch Eliya I in 1028.

The bishop Mari 'of Nifr and al-Nil' was present at the consecration of the patriarch ʿAbdishoʿ II in 1074. He died about three months afterwards, and was replaced as bishop of Nil by Sargis, "a disciple of the patriarchal cell". At the same time ʿAbdishoʿ II consecrated the bishop Nestorius of al-Nuʿmaniya metropolitan of 'Brah' (possibly Bardaʿa), and placed the diocese of al-Nuʿmaniya under the authority of Sargis.

The bishop Sargis of 'al-Nil and al-Nuʿmaniya', probably the same man, was present at the consecration of the patriarch Makkikha I in 1092.

=== Beth Waziq ===
The monks Elishaʿ and Giwargis of the monastery of Beth ʿAbe became bishops 'of Khanishabur, that is Beth Waziq', at unknown dates in the second half of the eighth or the first half of the ninth century.

An unnamed bishop of Beth Waziq (al-Bawazikh) was present at the consecration of the patriarch Eliya I in 1028.

The bishop Narsai of Beth Waziq was a friend of the East Syrian author Shlemun of Basra, and in 1222 Shlemun dedicated his Book of the Bee to him.

The bishop Shemʿon of al-Bawazikh was present at the consecration of the patriarch Makkikha II in 1257.

The bishop Brikhishoʿ of al-Bawazikh was present at the consecration of the patriarch Denha I in 1265.

The bishop Yohannan of Beth Waziq was present at the consecration of the patriarch Timothy II in 1318.

== Topographical survey ==
=== Baghdad ===
Baghdad, the capital of the Abbasid Caliphate, was the seat of the East Syrian patriarchs between the eighth and thirteenth centuries, and is frequently mentioned in the various literary sources in connection with the ceremonies attending their elections, consecrations, and burials. These sources mention several East Syrian monasteries and churches in or near Baghdad used as residences by the East Syrian patriarchs at different periods, and the relevant references have been conveniently collected by the French scholar J. M. Fiey, who also precisely localised most of the sites concerned. The patriarchal residences included the monastery of Klilishoʿ, also called 'the patriarchal monastery' (Dair al-Jathaliq), residence and burial place of the patriarch Timothy I (780–823) and several of his ninth-century successors; the monastery of Mar Pethion, residence of the patriarch Sabrishoʿ II (831–5); the church of Asbagh in the al-Shammasiya quarter, residence and burial place of the patriarch Yohannan II Bar Narsaï (884–91); the nearby 'Greek Palace' (Darta d'Romaye, Dar al-Rum), residence and burial place of sixteen of the seventeen patriarchs from Yohannan III (893–9) to Eliya II (1111–32); the monastery of ʿAbdon to the north of Baghdad, burial place of the patriarch Abraham III (906–37); the church of Mar Sabrishoʿ in the Suq al-Thalatha quarter, burial place of the patriarchs Bar Sawma (1134–6), Ishoʿyahb V (1149–75) and Eliya III (1176–90); the church of Mart Maryam of Karkh, residence and burial place of the patriarchs Yahballaha II (1190–1222), Sabrishoʿ IV (1222–4) and Sabrishoʿ V (1226–56); and the palace of Duwaidar ʿAla al-Din, burial place of the patriarchs Makkikha II (1257–65) and Denha I (1265–81).

Makkikha II was the last East Syrian patriarch to reside permanently in Baghdad. Baghdad's Christian population was spared by the Mongols when the city was captured and sacked in 1259, but the Mongol defeat at ʿAin Jalut in 1261 was followed by a Muslim reaction against the Christians of the caliphate. There were violent Muslim demonstrations in 1268 and 1269 in Baghdad, which forced the patriarch Denha I, consecrated in Baghdad in 1265, to withdraw first to Erbil and finally to Eshnuq. He died quite by chance in Baghdad in 1281, during his first visit to the city for sixteen years, and was probably the last East Syrian patriarch to be buried there. His successor Yahballaha III was consecrated in Baghdad in 1281, but also avoided the city for much of his reign, preferring to reside first in Eshnuq and finally in Maragha. However, a poem written in Karamlish in 1295 mentions that he restored the chapels and apartments in the Greek Palace, probably during the reign of the sympathetic il-khan Arghun, and built a "very beautiful gallery for counsel, recreation, and the reunions of the fathers".

The accession of the il-khan Ghazan in 1295 was followed immediately by a persecution of Christians in Baghdad and several other cities, in which a number of churches were confiscated. In Baghdad most churches were spared in return for bribes, but a new church built by Makkikha II was confiscated and turned into a mosque. The Muslims also recovered the palace of Duwaidar ʿAla al-Din, which had been taken from them and given to Makkikha II by Hulegu after the city's capture in 1259, and required the East Syrians to remove for reburial elsewhere the remains of the patriarchs Makkikha II and Denha I and other prominent clerics and monks buried there. Yahballaha III does not appear to have revisited Baghdad after these events, and after his death in 1317 was buried in Maragha.
