= Saliba ibn Yuhanna =

14th-century Syriac Christian author

Saliba or Sliba ibn Yuhanna (Arabic: Ṣalībā ibn Yūḥannā) was a medieval Syriac Christian, author of a 1332 Arabic compendium known as The Books of Secrets (Asfar al-Asrar). Born in Mosul in the late 13th century, he was active in Jazīrat Ibn ʿUmar on the upper Tigris in the early 14th century, and in Famagusta, Cyprus, in the 1330s.

He is principally known for his edition of Mari ibn Suleiman's and Amr ibn Matta's Book of Towers. MS Paris BNF Arab. 204 is a likely autograph, where ibn Yuhanna copied texts that interested him. The manuscript is internally dated to June 1315 and placed in Jazīrat Ibn ʿUmar. Years later, ibn Yuhanna added a Letter from the People of Cyprus to the manuscript, dated to 1336, written in Famagusta, Cyprus.

Ibn Yuhanna's "Book of Secrets" opens with a letter addressed to the Christians in the "West" (Byzantine Empire), defending the authenticity of the Church of the East and making a plea for Christian unity. It is plausible that ibn Yuhanna was already in Cyprus, at the time still a crusader kingdom (under king Hugh IV) when he completed this work.
