= Mari ibn Suleiman =

12th-century Nestorian Christian author

Mari ibn Suleiman or Sulaiman (Arabic: ماري إبن سليمان) was a 12th-century Nestorian Christian author writing in Arabic.

Nothing is known of his life. He is the author of a theological and historiographical work known as the Book of the Tower (Kitāb al-Majdal). The work consists of seven parts. The first is a general introduction, the second a theological treatise on Nestorian Christology, the third discusses Baptism and Eucharist, the fourth the seven virtues (piety, charity, prayer, fasting, pity, humility, chastity), the fifth on the "seven pillars" of Creation, Last Judgement, the Prophecies, the coming of the Messiah, the history of the Eastern Church, the history of heresies, and the canon of biblical texts. The sixth part presents the four "moats" of the Tower, as prayer, the observation of the Day of the Lord, candles and incense, and penitence. The seventh part describes the "gardens" of the Tower, where Christians, liberated from the obligations of Mosaic law, may repose.

The main interest of the work in modern scholarship is the historiographical material in its fifth part, an important testimony of the 11th to 12th-century history of the Eastern Church. The work can be dated approximately from the fact that the history ends with patriarch Abdisho III (r. 1139–1148), suggesting a composition in the 1140s.

In the 14th century, another author, Amr ibn Matta, imitated the work, and the two works have often been confused, even in their manuscripts. The main manuscript for the work is Paris arab. 190 (13th century), besides Paris arab. 191 and 192 (14th century). Three further manuscripts are in the Vatican, one in London.
