= Amr ibn Matta =

14th-century Syriac Christian author

ʿAmr ibn Mattā or Mattai al-Ṭīrhānī (Latin: Amrus, عمرو إبن متى, Amru ibn Matta) was the author of a 14th-century work known as The Book of the Tower (Arabic: Kitāb al-Majdal li-l-Istibṣār wa-l-Jadal). Ibn Matta's work is modelled after, and takes its title from, the Book of the Tower by 12th-century Nestorian writer Mari ibn Suleiman. Ibn Matta's work is discussed in a lengthy entry in the ecclesiastical encyclopedia Miṣbāḥ al-Zulma by Ibn Kabar (d. 1324).

Based on his nisbah, ibn Matta was a native of Ṭīrhān, a district now part of the city of Samarra, Iraq.
