= Nisibis (East Syriac ecclesiastical province) =

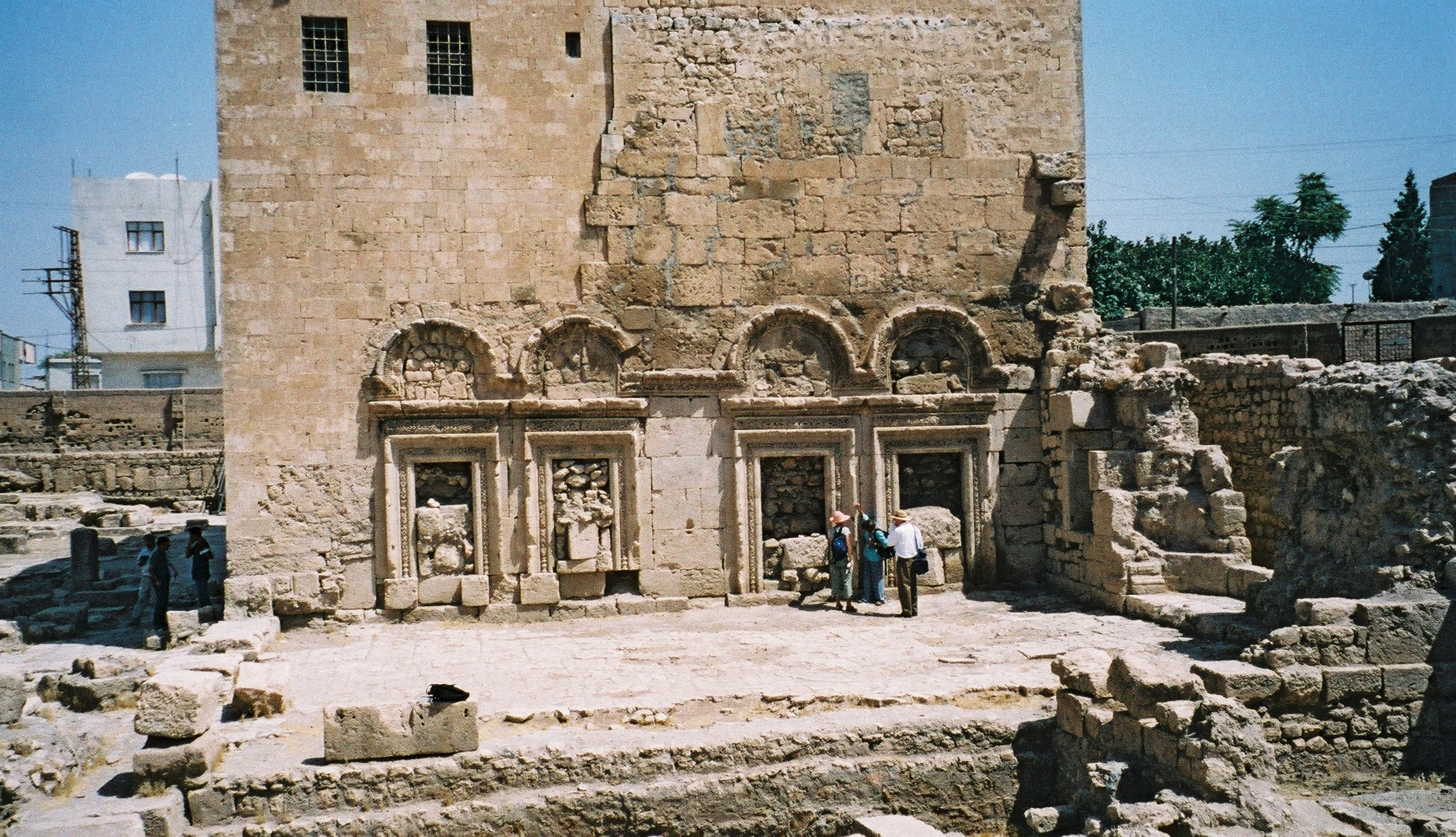
The ruins of the East Syriac church of Mar Yaqob in Nisibis

The Metropolitanate of Nisibis was an East Syriac metropolitan province of the Church of the East, between the fifth and seventeenth centuries. The ecclesiastical province of Nisibis (Syriac: Nisibin, ܢܨܝܒܝܢ, often abbreviated to Soba, ܨܘܒܐ) had a number of suffragan dioceses at different periods in its history, including Arzun, Beth Rahimaï, Beth Qardu (later renamed Tamanon), Beth Zabdaï, Qube d'Arzun, Balad, Shigar (Sinjar), Armenia, Beth Tabyathe and the Kartawaye, Harran and Callinicus (Raqqa), Maiperqat (with Amid and Mardin), Reshʿaïna, Qarta and Adarma, Qaimar and Hesna d'Kifa. Aoustan d'Arzun and Beth Moksaye were also suffragan dioceses in the fifth century.

== Background ==
In 363 the Roman emperor Jovian was obliged to cede Nisibis and five neighbouring districts to Persia to extricate the defeated army of his predecessor Julian from Persian territory. The Nisibis region, after nearly fifty years of rule by Constantine and his Christian successors, may well have contained more Christians than the entire Sassanian empire, and this Christian population was absorbed into the Church of the East in a single generation. The impact of the cession of Nisibis on the demography of the Church of the East was so marked that the province of Nisibis was ranked second among the five metropolitan provinces established at the synod of Isaac in 410, a precedence apparently conceded without dispute by the bishops of the three older Persian provinces relegated to a lower rank. The metropolitan of Nisibis ranked below the metropolitan of ʿIlam, but above the metropolitans of Maishan, Adiabene and Beth Garmaï.

The bishop of Nisibis was recognised in Canon XXI of the synod of Isaac as 'metropolitan of Arzun, of Qardu, of Beth Zabdaï, of Beth Rahimaï, of Beth Moksaye, and of the bishops to be found there', and the bishops Daniel of Arzun, Samuel 'of Arzun for Baita d'Aoustan', Daniel of Beth Moksaye, and Abraham of Beth Rahimaï were confirmed as his suffragans.

== Ecclesiastical history ==
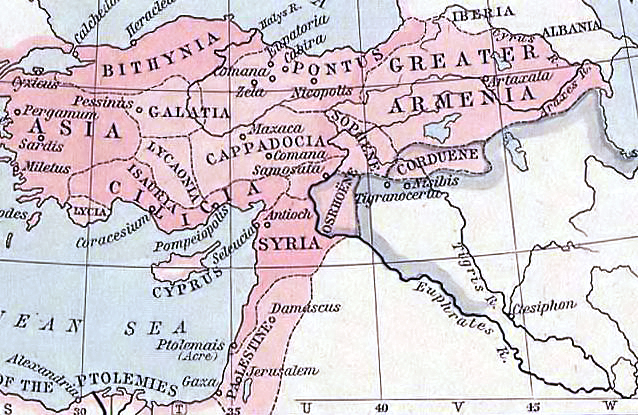
Nisibis was a frontier town between the Roman and Persian empires

The bishop of Nisibis was recognised in 410 as the metropolitan of Arzun (ܐܪܙܘܢ), Qardu (ܩܪܕܘ), Beth Zabdaï (ܒܝܬ ܙܒܕܝ), Beth Rahimaï (ܒܝܬ ܪܚܡܝ) and Beth Moksaye (ܒܝܬ ܡܘܟܣܝܐ). These were the Syriac names for Arzanene, Corduene, Zabdicene, Rehimene and Moxoene, the five districts ceded by Rome to Persia in 363. The metropolitan diocese of Nisibis (ܢܨܝܒܝܢ) and the suffragan dioceses of Arzun, Qardu and Beth Zabdaï were to enjoy a long history, but Beth Rahimaï is not mentioned again, while Beth Moksaye is not mentioned after 424, when its bishop Atticus (probably, from his name, a Roman) subscribed to the acts of the synod of Dadishoʿ. Besides the bishop of Arzun, a bishop of 'Aoustan d'Arzun' (plausibly identified with the district of Ingilene) also attended these two synods, and his diocese was also assigned to the province of Nisibis. The diocese of Aoustan d'Arzun survived into the sixth century, but is not mentioned after 554.

During the fifth and sixth centuries three new dioceses in the province of Nisibis were founded in Persian territory, in Beth ʿArabaye (the hinterland of Nisibis, between Mosul and the Tigris and Khabur rivers) and in the hill country to the northeast of Arzun. By 497 a diocese had been established at Balad (the modern Eski Mosul) on the Tigris, which persisted into the fourteenth century. By 563 there was also a diocese for Shigar (Sinjar), deep inside Beth ʿArabaye, and by 585 a diocese for 'Beth Tabyathe and the Kartawaye', the country to the west of Lake Van inhabited by the Kartaw Kurds. David was the bishop of the Kurds of Kartaw during or immediately after the reign of Hnanisho I (686–698).

The famous School of Nisibis was an important seminary and theological academy of the Church of the East during the late Sassanian period, and in the last two centuries of Sassanian rule generated a remarkable outpouring of East Syriac theological scholarship.

Probably during the Umayyad period, the East Syriac diocese of Armenia was attached to the province of Nisibis. The bishop Artashahr of Armenia was present at the synod of Dadishoʿ in 424, but the diocese was not assigned to a metropolitan province. In the late thirteenth century Armenia was certainly a suffragan diocese of the province of Nisibis, and its dependency probably went back to the seventh or eighth century. The bishops of Armenia appear to have sat at the town of Halat (Ahlat) on the northern shore of Lake Van.

The Arab conquest allowed the East Syriacs to move into western Mesopotamia and establish communities in Damascus and other towns that had formerly been in Roman territory, where they lived alongside much larger Syriac Orthodox, Armenian and Melkite communities. Some of these western communities were placed under the jurisdiction of the East Syriac metropolitans of Damascus, but others were attached to the province of Nisibis. The latter included a diocese for Harran and Callinicus (Raqqa), first attested in the eighth century and last mentioned towards the end of the eleventh century, and a diocese at Maiperqat, first mentioned at the end of the eleventh century, whose bishops were also responsible for the East Syrian communities in Amid and Mardin. Eleventh- and thirteenth-century lists of dioceses in the province of Nisibis also mention a diocese for the Syrian town of Reshʿaïna (Raʿs al-ʿAin). Reshʿaïna is a plausible location for an East Syriac diocese at this period, but none of its bishops are known.

Changes in the formal and informal titles borne by the metropolitans of Nisibis reflect the shifts in the province's centre of gravity over the centuries. In 497 the metropolitan Hosea of Nisibis was styled 'metropolitan of the country of Beth ʿArabaye'. In the eleventh century the metropolitan ʿAbdishoʿ Ibn ʿArid of Nisibis, who became patriarch in 1074, was styled 'metropolitan bishop of Soba [Nisibis] and Beth Nahrin [Mesopotamia]'. At the end of the thirteenth century the celebrated East Syriac writer ʿAbdishoʿ Bar Brikha, himself metropolitan of Nisibis, referred loosely to his province as 'Soba (Nisibis) and Mediterranean Syria'. Few Mesopotamian or Syrian dioceses still existed at this period, however, and ʿAbdishoʿ was normally styled 'metropolitan of Nisibis and Armenia'. As far as is known, the title 'metropolitan of Nisibis and Armenia' was used by all of ʿAbdishoʿ's successors until 1610, when the East Syriac metropolitan province of Nisibis was abolished.

ʿAbdishoʿ Bar Brikha listed thirteen suffragan dioceses in the province of Nisibis at the end of the thirteenth century, in the following order: Arzun, Qube, Beth Rahimaï, Balad, Shigar, Qardu, Tamanon, Beth Zabdaï, Halat, Harran, Amid, Reshʿaïna and 'Adormiah' (Qarta and Adarma). It has been convincingly argued that ʿAbdishoʿ was giving a conspectus of dioceses in the province of Nisibis at various periods in its history rather than an authentic list of late-thirteenth century dioceses, and it is unlikely that the dioceses of Qube, Beth Rahimaï, Harran and Reshʿaïna still existed at this period.

A diocese was founded around the middle of the thirteenth century to the north of the Tur ʿAbdin for the town of Hesna d'Kifa, perhaps in response to East Syriac immigration to the towns of the Tigris plain during the Mongol period. At the same time, a number of older dioceses may have ceased to exist. The dioceses of Qaimar and Qarta and Adarma are last mentioned towards the end of the twelfth century, and the diocese of Tamanon in 1265, and it is not clear whether they persisted into the fourteenth century. The only dioceses in the province of Nisibis definitely in existence at the end of the thirteenth century were Armenia (whose bishops sat at Halat on the northern shore of Lake Van), Shigar, Balad, Arzun and Maiperqat.

== Archdiocese of Nisibis ==
The see of Nisibis was founded in AD 300. At the Synod of 410 in Seleucia-Ctesiphon, Nisibis was made the metropolitan see of Beth ʿArbaye.

- Babu (300–309)
- St Jacob or James of Nisibis (309–338 or 350), founder of the School of Nisibis and a signatory of the First Council of Nicaea
- ...
- Hosea (fl. 410–424), signatory of the synods held by Isaac (410), Yahballaha I (420), and Dadishoʿ (424) The deacon and secretary Eliya was among the signatories of the acts of the synod held by Babaï in 497, on behalf of his bishop Hosea, "metropolitan of the country of Beth ʿArbaye".
- ...
- Barsauma, metropolitan of Nisibis, headed the Synod of Beth Lapat in 484.
- ...
- Paul (fl. 554), signatory of the synod held by Joseph in 554.
- ...
- Gregory (fl. c. 596), previously bishop of Kashkar
- ...
- Isaac (646–?), attested under Maremmeh's successor Ishoʿyahb III (r. 649–59).
- ...
- Qamishoʿ (697), consecrated by Hnanishoʿ I early in the year and died forty days later
- Sabrishoʿ of Balad (697–?)
- ...
- Ruzbihan (fl. c. 725), a former superior of the monastery of Mar Awgin appointed by Sliba-zkha (r. 714–28) who served for twelve years. Mari states that he was "of indifferent learning" but "very charitable towards the poor" and that he "restored the churches in his archdiocese".
- ...
- Cyprian (740/1–766/7)
- ...
- Yohannan or John (fl. c. 775 – c. 790), returned to the diocese upon his release from prison in 776/7 and among the bishops who witnessed the monk Nestorius's retraction of the Messallian heresy made in 790 prior to his consecration as bishop of Beth Nuhadra
- ...
- Qayyoma (fl. c. 870), a disciple of Sargis (r. 860–72) and former bishop of Tirhan.
- ...
- Bokhtishoʿ (d. 912/13)
- ...
- Ishoʿyahb (d. 994/5)
- Yahballaha (994/5–1006/7), former bishop of Maʿaltha
- Elijah, Elias, or Eliya of Nisibis (26 December 1008 –18 July 1046), former bishop of Beth Nuhadra and famed for his Chronography
- ...
- ʿAbdishoʿ II ibn al-ʿAridh (?–1074), who was elevated to patriarch (r. 1074–90). Under his reign the patriarch Sabrisho III introduced the custom of allowing the metropolitan of Nisibis to participate in patriarchal elections.
- Giwargis (1074), a former bishop of Arzun who died a few days after his consecration
- Ibn Hammad (1074–?)
- ...
- Ishoʿzkha (fl. 1281), present at Yahballaha III's 1281 consecration
- ...
- ʿAbdishoʿ Bar Brikha (1285 x 1291–?), former bishop of Shigar and Beth ʿArabaye, present at the 1318 consecration of Timothy II

== Diocese of Arzun ==
East Syriac bishops of Arzun (near present-day Siirt) are attested between the fifth and thirteenth centuries. A twelfth-century reference to the diocese of 'Arzun and Beth Dlish' indicates that the bishops of Arzun may have sat at Bitlis.

The bishop Daniel of Arzun was confirmed as a suffragan bishop of the metropolitan Hosea of Nisibis in Canon XXI of the synod of Isaac in 410, and was among the signatories of its acts. He was also among the signatories of the acts of the synod of Dadishoʿ in 424.

The bishop Job of Arzun was among the signatories of the acts of the synod of Babaï in 497.

The bishop Gabriel Ibn al-Shammas of Arzun was an unsuccessful candidate in the patriarchal election of 1012. His successful rival, the patriarch Yohannan VI, appointed him metropolitan of Mosul on 19 November 1012, immediately after his own consecration as patriarch.

The bishop Giwargis of Arzun was consecrated metropolitan of Nisibis by the patriarch ʿAbdishoʿ II shortly after his own consecration in 1074.

An unnamed bishop of Arzun was present at the consecration of the patriarch Bar Sawma in 1134.

The bishop Emmanuel of Arzun was present at the consecration of the patriarch Makkikha II in 1257.

The bishop Shemʿon of Arzun was present at the consecration of the patriarch Yahballaha III in 1281.

== Diocese of Aoustan d'Arzun ==
The bishop Samuel 'of Arzun for Baita d'Aoustan' was confirmed as a suffragan bishop of the metropolitan Hosea of Nisibis in Canon XXI of the synod of Isaac in 410, and was among the signatories of its acts.

The bishop Yohannan of 'Aoustan d'Arzun' was among the signatories of the acts of the synod of Dadishoʿ in 424.

The bishop 'Natum', probably Nathan, of 'Arzun d'Beth d'Aoustan' adhered by letter to the acts of the synod of Joseph in 554.

== Diocese of Qardu ==
The bishop Miles of Qardu was among the signatories of the acts of the synod of Dadishoʿ in 424.

The bishop Bar Sawma of Qardu was among the signatories of the acts of the synod of Joseph in 554.

The bishop Marutha of Qardu was among the signatories of the acts of the synod of Gregory in 605.

The bishop Theodore of Qardu was appointed metropolitan of ʿIlam by the patriarch Yohannan III immediately after his consecration on 15 July 893.

== Diocese of Beth Zabdaï ==
The bishop Yohannan of Beth Zabdai (Gazarta) was among the signatories of the acts of the synod of Babaï in 497.

The bishop Ishoʿyahb of Gazarta is mentioned together with the patriarch Abraham III (906–37) in the colophon of an East Syriac manuscript of 912.

The bishop Ishoʿyahb of Gazarta was present at the consecration of the patriarch ʿAbdishoʿ II in 1074.

An unnamed bishop of Gazarta was present at the consecration of the patriarch Bar Sawma in 1134.

== Diocese of Beth Moksaye ==
The bishop Daniel of Beth Moksaye was confirmed as a suffragan bishop of the metropolitan Hosea of Nisibis in Canon XXI of the synod of Isaac in 410.

The bishop Atticus of Beth Moksaye was among the signatories of the acts of the synod of Dadishoʿ in 424.

== Diocese of Beth Rahimaï ==
The bishop Abraham of Beth Rahimaï was confirmed as a suffragan bishop of the metropolitan Hosea of Nisibis in Canon XXI of the synod of Isaac in 410.

== Diocese of Qube d'Arzun ==
The bishop Gabriel of Qube d'Arzun was among the signatories of the acts of the synod of Timothy I in 790.

== Diocese of Tamanon ==
The bishop ʿAbdishoʿ of Tamanon was present at the consecration of the patriarch ʿAbdishoʿ II in 1074.

The bishop ʿAbdishoʿ of Tamanon was present at the consecration of the patriarch Eliya II in 1111.

The bishop Brikhishoʿ of Tamanon was present at the consecration of the patriarch Denha I in 1265.

== Diocese of Harran ==
The bishop Gregory the Alchemist was bishop of Harran during the reign of the patriarch Pethion (731–40).

ʿAbdishoʿ bar Bahrīz, who became the metropolitan of Mosul before 827, previously served as bishop of Harran.

The patriarch Sabrishoʿ II (831–5) was consecrated bishop of Harran by the metropolitan Yohannan of Nisibis, and became metropolitan of Damascus during the reign of Timothy I (780–823).

The bishop Yaʿqob "of Harran and Callinicus" (Raqqa) is mentioned together with the patriarch Yohannan III (893–9) in the dating formula of an East Syriac manuscript copied in the monastery of Mar Gabriel near Harran by the deacon Babai in 899.

The bishop Yohannan, bishop of ʿUkbara when Elijah of Nisibis completed his Chronography in 1018/19, was formerly bishop of Harran.

The bishop Eliya 'of Raqah (Raqqa)' was present at the consecration of the patriarch Makkikha I in 1092.

== Diocese of Maiperqat ==
The bishop Eliya, metropolitan of Damascus when Elijah of Nisibis completed his Chronography in 1018/19, was formerly bishop of Maiperqat.

The bishop Yohannan of Maiperqat was present at the consecration of the patriarch Makkikha II in 1257.

The bishop Ishoʿdnah of Maiperqat was present at the consecration of the patriarch Denha I in 1265 (as bishop 'of Mardin'). He was also present at the consecration of Yahballaha III in 1281 (as 'bishop of Miyafariqin').

== Diocese of Balad ==
The bishops Hawah and Shubhalishoʿ of Balad were among the signatories of the acts of the synod of Babaï in 497.

The bishop Yazdgird of Balad was among the signatories of the acts of the synod of Joseph in 554.

The future patriarch Ishoʿyahb II of Gdala (628–45) was appointed bishop of Balad after the death of the bishop Quriaqos of Balad.

The bishop Sabrishoʿ of Balad was appointed metropolitan of Nisibis by the patriarch Hnanishoʿ I after the death of the metropolitan Qamishoʿ, probably in 697.

An unnamed bishop of Balad was among the bishops who witnessed a retraction of the Messallian heresy made by the priest Nestorius of the monastery of Mar Yozadaq in 790 before his consecration as bishop of Beth Nuhadra.

The monk Quriaqos of the monastery of Beth ʿAbe, a native of the town of Gbilta in the Tirhan district, became bishop of Balad at an unknown date in the second half of the eighth century or the first half of the ninth century.

The bishop Yohannan of Balad was appointed metropolitan of Merv by the patriarch Sargis (860–72).

The bishop Eliya of Balad was appointed metropolitan of Bardaʿa by the patriarch Mari (987–99).

The bishop Sabrishoʿ of Balad was present at the consecration of the patriarch ʿAbdishoʿ II (1074–90), and was later consecrated metropolitan of ʿIlam by the same patriarch.

An unnamed bishop of Balad was present at the consecration of the patriarch Bar Sawma in 1134.

The bishop Shemʿon 'of Balad and al-Jaslona (Gaslona)' was present at the consecration of the patriarch Yahballaha III in 1281.

The bishop Shemʿon of Balad was present at the consecration of the patriarch Timothy II in 1318.

== Diocese of Shigar ==
The Diocese of Shigar was founded in the sixth century, probably to counter the growing influence of the Jacobites in the Sinjar region. The full name of the diocese was Shigar and Beth ʿArabaye, and it covered the desert region to the north of Sinjar, where there were several Nestorian monasteries. Six Nestorian bishops of Shigar are attested between the sixth and the fourteenth centuries. The first of these bishops, Bawai, is mentioned in 563. The last, Yohannan, was present at the consecration of the patriarch Timothy II in 1318.

It is not clear when the diocese of Shigar came to an end. The Shigar region seems to have had a small Nestorian community up to the seventeenth century, and may even have had a bishop from time to time. A metropolitan 'Glanan Imech' (possibly Maranʿemmeh), of 'Sciugar' is mentioned in the report of 1607, and may have been a bishop of Shigar. According to a Yazidi tradition, the last Nestorian 'metropolitan' of Sinjar died around 1660, and the region's few remaining Nestorian Christians become Yazidis. It is difficult to say whether there is any truth in this tradition.

== Diocese of Beth Tabyathe and the Kartawaye ==
The bishop Klilishoʿ of 'Beth Tabyathe and the Kartawaye' was among the signatories of the acts of the synod of Ishoʿyahb I in 585.

== Diocese of Qarta and Adarma ==
The diocese of Qarta and Adarma was listed as a suffragan diocese in the province of Nisibis in the Mukhtasar of 1007/8, and a bishop Mushe of Qarta and Adarma is attested during the reign of the catholicus Eliya II (1111–32). A ritual for the consecration of the bishop of Qarta and Adarma has survived in the works of the patriarch Eliya III (1176–90). Finally, a manuscript was copied in 1186 in the monastery of Mar Awgin near Nisibis for the village of Tel Mahmad 'in the diocese of Qarta'. Its colophon mentions that the manuscript was copied in the time of the patriarch Eliya III and the metropolitan Yahballaha of Nisibis, providing further confirmation that Qarta was a diocese in the province of Nisibis.

Qarta has been identified by Fiey with the monastery of Mar Gabrona and Mar Shmona (Arabic: Dayr al-Qara) near the Lailah Dagh, twenty kilometres to the southeast of Gazarta, and Adarma with the small town of Adarma, seventy kilometres east of Nisibis, near the modern Tel Rmelan al-Kabir. The seat of the bishops of Qarta and Adarma may have been the monastery of Gabrona and Shmona, mentioned in the colophons of manuscripts of 1213/4 and 1217/8.

== Diocese of Armenia ==
The Nestorian diocese of Armenia, whose bishops sat in the town of Halat (Ahlat) on the northern shore of Lake Van, is attested between the fifth and fourteenth centuries. In the fifth century the diocese of Halat was not assigned to a metropolitan province, but was later included in the province of Nisibis, probably shortly after the Arab conquest. The patriarch Timothy I created a metropolitan province for Armenia, presumably by raising the status of the diocese of Halat. By the second half of the eleventh century Halat was once again a suffragan diocese of the province of Nisibis. By the thirteenth century the jurisdiction of the bishops of Halat included the towns of Van and Wastan.

== The diocese of Qaimar ==
An unnamed bishop of Qaimar was present at the consecration of the patriarch Bar Sawma in 1134.

The bishop Sabrishoʿ of Qaimar was transferred to the diocese of Kashkar by the patriarch Eliya III (1176–90).

== Diocese of Hesna d'Kifa ==
A diocese was founded around the middle of the thirteenth century to the north of the Tur ʿAbdin for the town of Hesna d'Kifa.

The bishop Eliya of Hesna d'Kifa was present at the enthronement of Makkikha II in 1257.

The bishop Emmanuel of Hesna d'Kifa was present at the consecration of the patriarch Yahballaha III in 1281.

== Unspecified sees ==
The unperfected bishop Ibn Fadala, 'guardian of the throne of Nisibis' and bishop of an unnamed diocese in the province of Nisibis, was present together with the metropolitan Yohannan of Nisibis at the consecration of the patriarch ʿAbdishoʿ III in 1139. He was required to proclaim the patriarch's name in the traditional ceremony in the church of Mar Pethion, 'because all the bishops of the great eparchy [Beth Aramaye] had died, and their thrones were vacant; something which had never happened before'.
