= Diocese of Kashkar =

Former diocese in Mesopotamia

Diocese of Kashkar, sometimes called Kaskar, was the senior diocese in the Church of the East's Province of the Patriarch. Its see was in the city of Kashkar. The diocese is attested between the fourth and the twelfth centuries. The bishops of Kashkar had the privilege of guarding the patriarchal throne during the interregnum between the death of a patriarch and the appointment of his successor. As a result, they are often mentioned by name in the standard histories of the Nestorian patriarchs, so that a relatively full list of the bishops of the diocese has survived.

== History ==
According to legend, the diocese of Kashkar was the oldest diocese in Persia. It was said to have been founded by the apostle Mari in the first century, several decades before the establishment of a diocese in the Persian capital Seleucia-Ctesiphon. Although a first-century foundation date is highly unlikely, the diocese of Kashkar was certainly one of the oldest dioceses of the Church of the East. The antiquity of the diocese and its claim to an apostolic foundation were recognised at the synod of Isaac in 410, when it was ranked second after the patriarchal diocese of Seleucia-Ctesiphon and its bishop was appointed guardian of the patriarchal throne (natar kursya).

The earliest-known bishop of Kashkar was ʿAbdishoʿ, who was one of several Persian bishops who opposed the claim to precedence put forward by the bishop Papa of Seleucia-Ctesiphon in 315. The last-known bishop of Kashkar was Sabrishoʿ, who was transferred from the diocese of Qaimar to Kashkar by the patriarch Eliya III (1176–90). By 1222 the guardianship of the vacant patriarchal throne, for centuries a privilege of the bishops of Kashkar, was in the hands of the metropolitans of Beth Huzaye.

== Bishops of Kashkar ==
The bishop ʿAbdishoʿ of Kashkar was one of several Persian bishops who opposed the claim to precedence put forward by the bishop Papa of Seleucia-Ctesiphon in 315.

The bishop Paul of Kashkar was martyred between 341 and 350, during the persecution of Shapur II.

The successive bishops ʿAbdishoʿ and ʿAbda of Kashkar were martyred in 376 or 377.

The bishop Maraï of Kashkar was among the signatories of the acts of the synod of Isaac in 410.

The bishop Abner of Kashkar was one of eleven named bishops listed in the acts of the synod of Dadishoʿ in 424 as having been reproved at the synods of Isaac in 410 and Yahballaha I in 420.

The bishop ʿAbdishoʿ of Kashkar was among the signatories of the acts of the synod of Acacius in 486.

The bishop Emmanuel of Kashkar was among the signatories of the acts of the synod of Babaï in 497.

The bishop Shubhalmaran of Kashkar was among the signatories of the acts of the synod of Joseph in 554.

The bishop Maraï of Kashkar was among the signatories of the acts of the synod of Ezekiel in 576.

The bishop Shemʿon of Kashkar was among the signatories of the acts of the synod of Ishoʿyahb I in 585.

The bishop Gregory of Kashkar was appointed by Ishoʿyahb I, according to the Chronicle of Seert (before 596).

The bishop Theodore of Kashkar was among the signatories of the acts of the synod of Gregory in 605.

The bishop Yazdapneh of Kashkar was among the bishops present at the deathbed of the patriarch Ishoʿyahb III in 659.

The patriarch Aba II was bishop of Kashkar before his election and consecration as patriarch in 740/1.

The bishop Isaac of Kashkar assembled a synod of East Syriac bishops in 773 to elect a patriarch after the death of the patriarch Yaʿqob II.

The bishop Brikh-Baroyeh of Kashkar was among the signatories of the acts of the synod of Timothy I in 790.

The bishop Zakarya of Kashkar was present at the consecration of the patriarch Ishoʿ Bar Nun in 823.

The bishop Israel of Kashkar was appointed by the patriarch Sargis (860–72).

The bishop Hnanishoʿ of Kashkar was natar kursya between the death of the patriarch Enosh and the consecration of his successor Yohannan II in 884.

The bishop David of Kashkar was natar kursya between the death of the patriarch Yohannan IV in 905 and the consecration of his successor Abraham III in 906.

The bishop Israel of Kashkar acted as natar kursya after the death of the patriarch Emmanuel I in 960, and was briefly elected patriarch himself in 961.

The bishop Abraham of Kashkar was transferred from the diocese of Hamadan by the patriarch ʿAbdishoʿ I (963–86). He was deposed and excommunicated for seven years for misbehaviour, and was eventually restored to his old diocese at the request of the Nestorians of Hamadan.

The bishop Ishoʿ (ʿIsa) was appointed for Kashkar by the patriarch Mari (987–99).

The bishop Shemʿon, metropolitan of Beth Garmaï when Elijah of Nisibis completed his Chronography in 1018/19, was originally bishop of Beth Daraye and later bishop of Kashkar.

The bishop Mari Ibn Kura of Kashkar died shortly before the patriarch Yohannan VII in 1057, requiring the office of natar kursya to be undertaken by the bishop of al-Nuʿmaniya.

The bishop Hormizd of Kashkar was present at the consecration of the patriarch ʿAbdishoʿ II in 1074.

The seat of the diocese of Kashkar appears to have been transferred to Wasit by the end of the eleventh century. The bishop Hormizd 'of Wasit' was present at the consecration of the patriarch Makkikha I in 1092.

An unnamed bishop of Wasit was perfected by the patriarch Bar Sawma after his consecration in 1134.

The bishop Sabrishoʿ of Qaimar was transferred to the diocese of Kashkar by the patriarch Eliya III (1176–90).

=== Titular see ===
The titular see of Kaskar of the Chaldeans is included, as an archiepiscopal titular see of the Chaldean Catholic Church, in the list of such sees recognized by the Catholic Church. The title has been vacant since 2003. It has had a single incumbent, Titular Archbishop Emmanuel-Karim Delly (1967.05.06 – 2003.12.03).
