= Israel of Kashkar =

Anti-Patriarch of the Church of the East in 877

Israel of Kashkar was briefly an anti-patriarch of the Church of the East in 877. His name is not included in most traditional lists of patriarchs of the Church of the East.

== Sources ==
Brief accounts of Israel's patriarchate are given in the Ecclesiastical Chronicle of the Jacobite writer Bar Hebraeus (floruit 1280) and in the ecclesiastical histories of the Nestorian writers Mari (twelfth-century), ʿAmr (fourteenth-century) and Sliba (fourteenth-century).

== Israel's patriarchate ==
The following account of Israel's controversial election is given by Bar Hebraeus:

At about the same time, in the third year of the caliph al-Muʿtamid, the Nestorian catholicus Sargis died, after fulfilling his office for twelve years. After their church remained widowed for four years, he was succeeded by Enosh, the metropolitan of Mosul. A great dissension arose among the people, with some calling for Enosh and others for Israel, bishop of Kashkar. When two men met, one would ask, 'Are you for Enosh or for Israel?' If the other man gave the wrong answer, the questioner punched him and kicked him as hard as he could. The scribes and the doctors of the caliph took the part of Enosh, and removed Israel. Enosh was thereupon consecrated at Seleucia after the feast of Epiphany in the year 263 of the Arabs [AD 876].

The following, more substantial, account of Israel's reign is given by Mari:

Enosh was appointed metropolitan of Mosul by Sargis. After his death the bishop Israel of Kashkar arrived and summoned the fathers to the customary synod. Many of the faithful decided to vote for him and elect him patriarch, thinking that as a learned and honest man, who was widely admired by the Christians, he deserved that dignity. But Enosh, metropolitan of Mosul, a learned and bold man, came forward to claim the patriarchate for himself, and many of the faithful decided to vote for him. A party was formed to support him, the people were divided into two camps, and discords and evils arose. The people boldly inveighed against the nobles, and each candidate asked the friends of the sultan to support his own bid. Meanwhile, the public peace was also disturbed by al-ʿAlawi of Basra. Then the governor of Baghdad sent a man to bring Israel from Samarra to Baghdad, and told him not to say a word about the patriarchate if the Christians asked him about it.

One of the supporters of Enosh, when Israel was descending from the bema during the singing of the responses of the liturgy, lost all fear of God, and in the press of the large crowd seized and crushed his testicles. He was carried away in a faint, and after lying ill for forty days he eventually died, and was buried in the chapel of the martyrs in the old church of the monastery of Mar Pethion.

== See also ==
- List of patriarchs of the Church of the East

== Notes ==
Church of the East titles
| Preceded by Sargis (860–872) | Catholicos-Patriarch of the East (877) | Succeeded by Enosh (877–884) |
