= Salakh (East Syriac diocese) =

The Diocese of Salakh was an East Syriac diocese of the Church of the East in the metropolitan province of Adiabene, attested in the eighth and ninth centuries.

== Background ==
The diocese of Salakh (ܣܠܟ), which covered the mountainous region to the east of Rawanduz, does not feature in the classical lists of the dioceses of Adiabene, but several eighth-century bishops of Salakh are mentioned in Thomas of Marga's Book of Governors (written c.840). The History of Mar Sabrishoʿ of Beth Qoqa also mentions a ninth-century bishop of Salakh. It is not clear when the diocese came to an end.

== Bishops of Salakh ==
A bishop named Yohannan was consecrated for Salakh by the metropolitan Yohannan of Adiabene during the reign of the patriarch Sliba-zkha (714–28), in consequence of the death of an unnamed bishop of Salakh. Yohannan seems to have been the predecessor of the bishop Ishoʿzkha of Salakh.

The monk Ishoʿzkha of the monastery of Beth ʿAbe, a native of Beth Aramaye, was consecrated for Salakh during the reign of the patriarch Sliba-zkha (714–28) and died during the reign of the patriarch Aba II (742–52).

The ascetic Maranʿammeh, head of the East Syriac school in Kfar ʿUzail near Erbil, was consecrated bishop of Salakh by the metropolitan Ahha of Adiabene on the death of the bishop Ishoʿzkha of Salakh, during the reign of the patriarch Aba II (742–52). Maranʿammeh was appointed metropolitan of Adiabene during the reign of Yaʿqob II (754–73), and during his metropolitanate he adjusted the boundaries of the dioceses of Salakh and Adarbaigan, transferring the district of Daibur from Salakh to Adarbaigan and the district of Inner Salakh from Adarbaigan to Salakh.

The monastery of Beth Qoqa, destroyed after the death of its superior Sabrishoʿ, was restored at an unknown date in the ninth century by the bishop Gabriel of Salakh, who had previously been a monk of the monastery.
