= Kashkar (disambiguation) =

Kashkar is an ancient city of Mesopotamia.

Kashkar may also refer to:

- Kaškar, a former city and current titular see of Oman
- Kashkar (East Syriac Diocese), a former diocese of the Church of the East
- Kashkar, an alternative name for Chitral, a city in Pakistan
- Kashkar, or Qashqari, an alternative name of the Khowar language of Pakistan
- Kara-Kashkar, a village in Kyrgyzstan

== See also ==
- Kaskar (disambiguation)
- Kaskar (disambiguation)
- Cascar (disambiguation)
- Kashgar (disambiguation), an oasis city in Xinjiang, China
- Kashmar, city and capital of Kashmar County
