= Shemon III =

Mar Shemʿon III
- Patriarch of the Church of the East
- Church: Church of the East
- See: Seleucia-Ctesiphon
- Installed: c.1425
- Term ended: c.1450
- Predecessor: Eliya IV
- Successor: Shemon IV

Personal details
- Born: 14th century
- Died: 15th century

Mar Shemʿon III was the patriarch of the Church of the East in the early 15th century. There is uncertainty over his existence, his dates and his place in the order of patriarchs.

Traditionally, Shemʿon III is listed between patriarchs Shemʿon II, whose reign began in 1381/2, and Eliya IV, who is said to have died in 1437. A manuscript made in the reign of the Shemʿon who succeeded Eliya IV casts doubt on this reconstruction, however. In a copy of the Book of the Bee, a list of patriarchs has been extended from the time of Timothy II to "Shemʿon of our days". The intervening patriarchs are Denha II, a certain Shemʿon and Eliya IV. This can only be Shemʿon II.

Manuscript colophons from 1429/30 and 1437 attest to a patriarch named Shemʿon, and David Wilmshurst suggests that this person, along with the "Shemʿon of our days" of the Bee manuscript, was Shemʿon III, who succeeded Eliya IV around 1425. He dates his patriarchate from c. 1425 to c. 1450. Jean Maurice Fiey went so far as to deny the existence of Shemʿon III entirely. This would give Shemʿon IV (successor of Eliya IV or Shemʿon III, depending on the list) a reign of sixty years or more.

== Bibliography ==
- Burleson, Samuel; Van Rompay, Lucas (2011). "List of Patriarchs: I. The Church of the East and its Uniate Continuations". In Sebastian P. Brock; Aaron M. Butts; George A. Kiraz; Lucas Van Rompay (eds.). Gorgias Encyclopedic Dictionary of the Syriac Heritage. Gorgias Press.
- Wilmshurst, David J. (2000). The Ecclesiastical Organisation of the Church of the East, 1318–1913. Peeters.
- Wilmshurst, David J. (2011). The Martyred Church: A History of the Church of the East. East and West Publishing.
- Wilmshurst, David J. (2019). "The Patriarchs of the Church of the East". In Daniel King (ed.). The Syriac World. Routledge. pp. 799–805.

Church of the East titles
Preceded by Eliya IV (c.1405–c.1425)	Catholicos-Patriarch of the East (c.1425–c.1450)	Succeeded by Shemon IV (c.1450–1497)
