= Sabrisho II =

Sabrishoʿ II was Patriarch of the Church of the East from 831 to 835. He sat during the reigns of the caliphs al-Maʿmun (813–33) and al-Muʿtasim (833–41).

== Sources ==
Accounts of Sabrishoʿ's patriarchate are given in the Ecclesiastical Chronicle of the Jacobite writer Bar Hebraeus (floruit 1280) and in the ecclesiastical histories of the Nestorian writers Mari (twelfth-century), ʿAmr (fourteenth-century) and Sliba (fourteenth-century).

== Sabrishoʿ's patriarchate ==
A brief account of Sabrishoʿ's patriarchate is given by Bar Hebraeus:

After him (Ishoʿ Bar Nun) sat Sabrishoʿ, who had previously been bishop of Harran and then metropolitan of Damascus. He was consecrated catholicus at Seleucia in the year 217 of the Arabs [AD 832/3], and died after fulfilling his office for four years.

A far more substantial account is given by Mari:

Sabrishoʿ was a native of Beth Nuhadra, who was consecrated bishop of Harran by the metropolitan Yuwanis of Nisibis, and transferred by Timothy to the archdiocese of Damascus. He was an expert in church ritual, but was not otherwise gifted. He gave a magnificent reception to al-Maʿmun and some of the Christians in his suite on the occasion of their visit to Damascus, thereby winning the gratitude of all. He was elected and consecrated patriarch in the year 217 of the Arabs, and soon afterwards went to the great monastery and restored the church of the monastery of Mar Pethion, an ancient monastery that had been built in the time of the Persians. Because al-Mansur had built his city [Baghdad] and people had flocked there to live in it, Sabrishoʿ demolished those churches, because many people were considering squatting in them, but he left the sanctuary and the altar intact, and he rebuilt the confessional and the portico. He also built a school, and gathered scholars there. Ali and ʿIsa, the sons of David, were its governors, and the patriarch fixed his seat there. He instituted a monthly subsidy of four dinars from the revenues of that school to the monks of the monastery of Sirsir, also known as Deir Salib, who were practicing the trade of interpreters in that monastery. He also built villages, and living thriftily himself, accumulated much money from their revenues which he spent on the school, on the churches and on hospitality for pilgrims. He died after fulfilling his office for four years and one month, and was buried in the monastery of Klilishoʿ.

The wider context of Sabrishoʿ's reign has been described by the French scholar Jean-Maurice Fiey, who has also given an assessment of his relations with al-Maʿmun and al-Muʿtasim. A modern assessment of his reign can also be found in David Wilmshurst's The Martyred Church.

== See also ==
- List of patriarchs of the Church of the East

== Notes ==
Church of the East titles
| Preceded by Giwargis II (828–831) | Catholicos-Patriarch of the East (831–835) | Succeeded by Abraham II (837–850) |
