= Shigar (East Syriac diocese) =

Diocese of Shigar and Beth ʿArabaye

Location
- Ecclesiastical province: Nisibin
- Metropolitan: Shigar

Information
- Denomination: Church of the East
- Rite: East Syriac Rite
- Established: 6th century

The Diocese of Shigar and Beth ʿArabaye were an East Syriac diocese of the Church of the East in the metropolitan province of Nisibis, centred on the town of Sinjar. The diocese is attested between the sixth and the fourteenth centuries.

== History ==
The Nestorian diocese of Shigar was founded in the sixth century, probably to counter the growing influence of the Jacobites in the region. The full name of the diocese was Shigar and Beth ʿArabaye, and it covered the desert region to the north of Sinjar, where there were several Nestorian monasteries. Six Nestorian bishops of Shigar are attested between the sixth and the fourteenth centuries. The first of these bishops, Bawai, is mentioned in 563. The last, Yohannan, was present at the consecration of the patriarch Timothy II in 1318.

It is not clear when the diocese of Shigar came to an end. The Shigar region seems to have had a small Nestorian community up to the seventeenth century, and may even have had a bishop from time to time. A metropolitan 'Glanan Imech' (possibly Maranʿemmeh), of 'Sciugar', is mentioned in the report of 1607, and may have been a bishop of Shigar. According to a Yezidi tradition, the last Nestorian 'metropolitan' of Sinjar died around 1660, and the region's few remaining Nestorian Christians became Yezidis. It is difficult to say whether there is any truth in this tradition.

== Nestorian monasteries and villages in Beth Arabaye ==
The Beth ʿArabaye region lay between Mosul and Nisibis. Its main centres were the towns of Balad (modern Eski Mosul) and Shigar (Sinjar), both of which had Nestorian bishops, and therefore presumably Nestorian communities, as late as 1318. At an earlier period there were Nestorian communities in the villages of Kfar Zamre (the seat of a Nestorian bishop in 790), Awana (home of the monk Ahron, founder of an eighth-century monastery near Balad), and Beth Ushnaya (mentioned by ʿAmr as the scene of a miracle in 1201); there was a Nestorian monastery of Baʿuth not far from Kfar Zamre (mentioned also by ʿAmr in 1201); and there were several Nestorian monasteries in the immediate vicinity of Balad, including the sixth-century monasteries of Mar Ishoʿzkha (mentioned in the History of Rabban Bar ʿIdta) and Mar Denha (mentioned by ʿAmr), the monasteries of Mar Pethion, Rabban Ahron and Rabban Joseph (mentioned around the end of the eighth century in Thomas of Marga's Book of Governors), and a nunnery in Balad itself (mentioned in the tenth century in the Life of Rabban Joseph Busnaya). There are no references to any of these communities after the beginning of the thirteenth century, and it is not known whether they survived into the fourteenth century. Only one manuscript has survived from the region, copied in 894 in the monastery of Rabban Joseph near Awana, on the east bank of the Tigris opposite Balad, by the scribe Sliba-zkha.

== Bishops of Shigar ==
An itinerant bishop in the Shigar region named Maʿin, previously a general in the Persian army, is attested between 374 and 411, but no bishops from the Shigar region attended any of the fifth- and sixth-century synods. A regular Nestorian diocese for Shigar is not attested until the second half of the sixth century.

The bishop Bawai of Shigar is attested in 563.

The bishop Shemʿon of Shigar is attested towards the end of the tenth century.

The bishop Mushe of Shigar was present at the consecration of the patriarch Makkikha I in 1092.

The bishop Mari of Shigar was present at the consecration of the patriarch Makkikha II in 1257.

The Nestorian author ʿAbdishoʿ Bar Brikha, who flourished during the reign of the patriarch Yahballaha III (1281–1317), was bishop of Shigar and Beth ʿArabaye before his consecration as metropolitan of Nisibis between 1285 and 1291.

The bishop Yohannan of Shigar was present at the consecration of the patriarch Timothy II in 1318.
