= Mar Aba =

Mar Aba may refer to:

- Aba, one of the martyr companions of Abda and Abdisho in 376
- Aba I, patriarch of the Church of the East from 540 to 552
- Aba Qozma, coadjutor of the Church of the East together with Babai the Great from 609 to 628
- Aba II, patriarch of the Church of the East from 741 to 751
