= Patriarch George II =

Patriarch George II or Giwargis II may refer to:

- Giwargis II (Church of the East), ruled in 828–831
- Patriarch George II of Alexandria, ruled in 1021–1051
- Patriarch George II of Constantinople, ruled in 1191–1198
- George II Beseb'ely, Maronite Patriarch of Antioch in 1657–1670
- Patriarch Ignatius George II, head of the Syriac Orthodox Church in 1687–1708
