= Eliya IV =

Mar Eliya IV
- Patriarch of the Church of the East
- Church: Church of the East
- See: Seleucia-Ctesiphon
- Installed: c.1405
- Term ended: c.1425
- Predecessor: Shemon II
- Successor: Shemon III

Personal details
- Born: 14th century
- Died: 15th century

Mar Eliya IV (or Elīyā IV) was the patriarch of the Church of the East from c. 1405 until c. 1425. His reign falls in a period of obscurity owing to the limited contemporary evidence.

He appears in a contemporary list of patriarchs in a 15th-century manuscript copy of the Book of the Bee between two patriarchs named Shemʿon. Traditionally these are Shemʿon III and Shemʿon IV, but David Wilmshurst has argued on the basis of the aforementioned manuscript that there was only one Shemʿon between Denha II and Eliya IV, and that this must be Shemʿon II. He suggests placing Shemʿon III after Eliya IV.

In view of the upheavals in Iraq in his time, it is unlikely that he was consecrated in Baghdad. Probably he was consecrated and resided in a monastery in northern Iraq. Traditionally his death has been placed in 1437, since in that year a patriarch named Shemʿon is mentioned in a dating clause in a manuscript colophon. A colophon in a manuscript copied by the scribe Masʿud of Kfarburan, dating to 1429/30, also mentions a patriarch Shemʿon, which would push back Eliya's death date to the 1420s.

== Notes ==
Church of the East titles
Preceded by Shemon II (c.1385–c.1405)	Catholicos-Patriarch of the East (c.1405–c.1425)	Succeeded by Shemon III (c.1425–c.1450)
