= Simeon III =

Simeon III may refer to:

- Simeon Stylites III (fl. 5th century), pillar saint
- Shemʿon III, patriarch of the Church of the East in the early 15th century
- Simeon III (fl. c. 1616), catholicos of Caucasian Albania
