= Dioceses of the Church of the East, 1318–1552 =

Dioceses of the Church of the East, 1318–1552 were metropolitan provinces and dioceses of the Church of the East, during the period from 1318 to 1552. They were far fewer in number than during the period of the Church's greatest expansion in the tenth century. Between 1318 and 1552, the geographical horizons of the Church of the East, which had once stretched from Egypt to China, narrowed drastically. By 1552, with the exception of a number of East Syriac communities in India, the ecclesiastical jurisdiction of the Church of the East was confined to its original heartland in northern Mesopotamia.

== Background ==
=== Consolidation of East Syriac Christianity in northern Mesopotamia ===
By the end of the thirteenth century, although isolated East Syriac outposts persisted to the southeast of the Great Zab, the districts of northern Mesopotamia included in the metropolitan provinces of Mosul and Nisibis were clearly regarded as the heartland of the Church of the East. When the monks Bar Sawma and Marcos (the future patriarch Yahballaha III) arrived in Mesopotamia from China in the late 1270s, they visited several East Syriac monasteries and churches:

They arrived in Baghdad, and from there they went to the great church of Kokhe, and to the monastery of Mar Mari the apostle, and received a blessing from the relics of that country. And from there they turned back and came to the country of Beth Garmaï, and they received blessings from the shrine of Mar Ezekiel, which was full of helps and healings. And from there they went to Erbil, and from there to Mosul. And they went to Shigar, and Nisibis and Mardin, and were blessed by the shrine containing the bones of Mar Awgin, the second Christ. And from there they went to Gazarta d'Beth Zabdaï, and they were blessed by all the shrines and monasteries, and the religious houses, and the monks, and the fathers in their dioceses.

With the exception of the patriarchal church of Kokhe in Baghdad and the nearby monastery of Mar Mari, all these sites were well to the north of Baghdad, in the districts of northern Mesopotamia where historic East Syriac Christianity survived into the twentieth century.

A similar pattern is evident several years later. Eleven bishops were present at the consecration of the Patriarch Timothy II in 1318: the metropolitans Joseph of ʿIlam, ʿAbdishoʿ of Nisibis and Shemʿon of Mosul, and the bishops Shemʿon of Beth Garmaï, Shemʿon of Tirhan, Shemʿon of Balad, Yohannan of Beth Waziq, Yohannan of Shigar, ʿAbdishoʿ of Hnitha, Isaac of Beth Daron and Ishoʿyahb of Tella and Barbelli (Marga). Timothy himself had been metropolitan of Erbil before his election as patriarch. Again, with the exception of ʿIlam (whose metropolitan, Joseph, was present in his capacity of 'designated successor' (natar kursya) all the dioceses represented were in northern Mesopotamia.

=== Collapse of the exterior provinces ===
The exterior provinces of the Church of the East, with the important exception of India, collapsed during the second half of the fourteenth century. Although little is known of the circumstances of the demise of the East Syriac dioceses in Central Asia (which may never have fully recovered from the destruction caused by the Mongols a century earlier), it may have been due to a combination of persecution, disease, and isolation.

The blame for the destruction of the East Syriac communities east of Iraq has often been thrown upon the Turco-Mongol leader Timur, whose campaigns during the 1390s spread havoc throughout Persia and Central Asia. There is no reason to doubt that the destruction wrought by Timur fell indiscriminately upon Christians and Muslims alike, but in many parts of Central Asia, Christianity had died out decades before Timur's campaigns. The surviving evidence from Central Asia, including a large number of dated graves, indicates that the crisis for the East Syriac church occurred in the 1340s rather than the 1390s.

Several contemporaries, including the papal envoy John of Marignolli, mention the murder of the Latin bishop Richard and six of his companions in 1339 or 1340 by a Muslim mob in Almaliq, the chief city of Tangut, and the forcible conversion of the city's Christians to Islam. The last tombstones in two East Syriac cemeteries discovered in Mongolia around the end of the nineteenth century date from 1342, and several commemorate deaths during a plague in 1338. In China, the last references to East Syriac and Latin Christians date from the 1350s, and it is likely that all foreign Christians were expelled from China soon after the revolution of 1368, which replaced the Mongol Yuan dynasty with the xenophobic Ming dynasty.

The collapse of East Syriac Christianity in Asia was probably so complete because it had always been the custom of the Church of the East to send out bishops from Mesopotamia to the dioceses of the 'exterior provinces'. In the chaos which followed the death of the Ilkhan Abu Saʿid in 1335, it may have been unable to send out fresh bishops to Central Asia, and without leaders of their own, the absorption of these communities by Islam was inevitable.

=== Campaigns of Timur, 1380–1405 ===
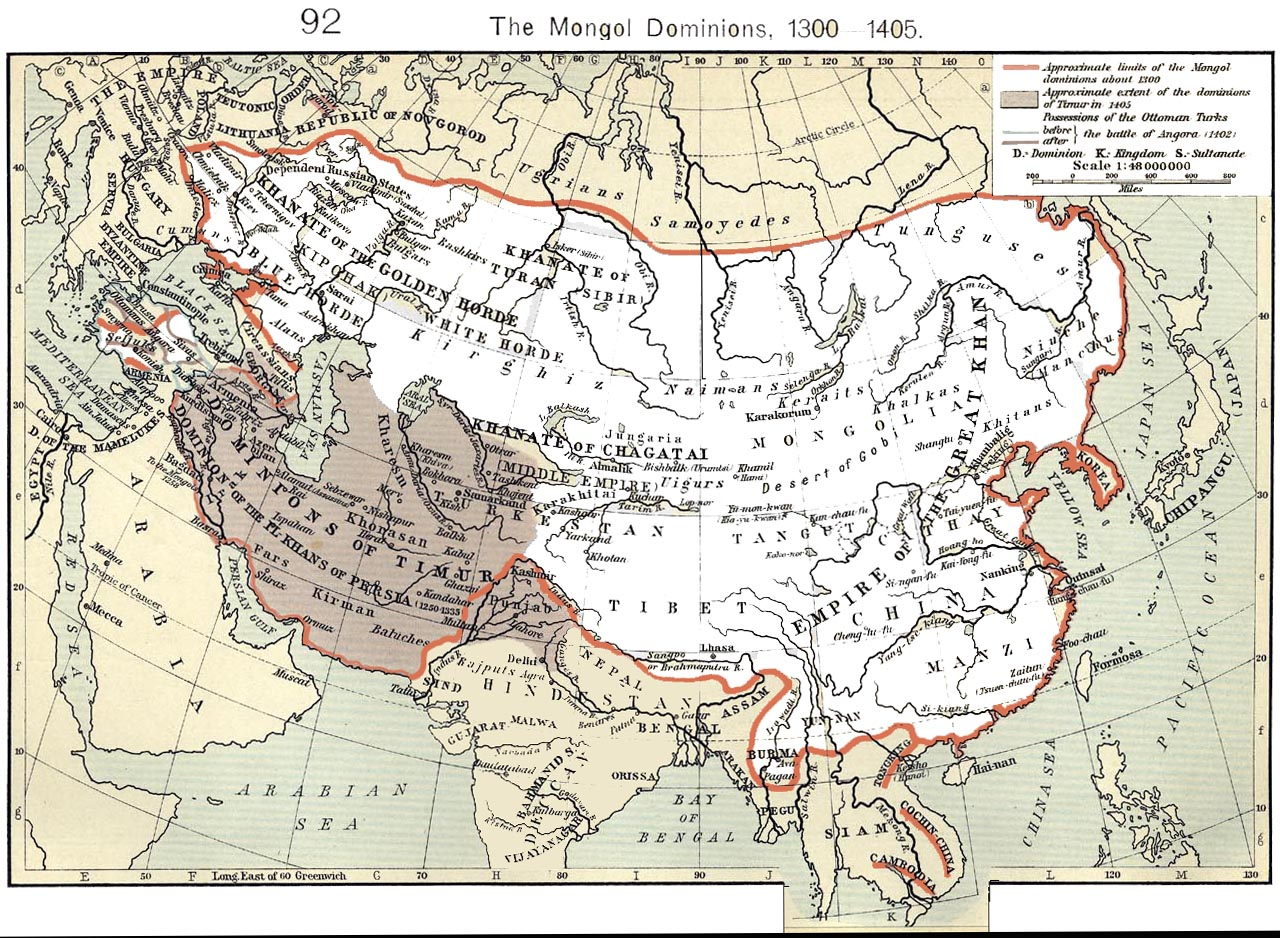
Timur Leng's empire, c.1405

It is possible that several East Syriac dioceses in Iraq were destroyed during the savage campaigns of Timur in western Asia between 1380 and 1405. The West Syriac centre of Tagrit in the Ṭirhan district was sacked by Timur, ending its importance as the residence of the local Syriac Orthodox primates, titled as maphrians, and the neighbouring East Syriac communities in Beth Garmaï and Adiabene may have been treated in a similar fashion. In the absence of a better context, the disappearance of the traditional East Syriac dioceses of Beth Waziq, Beth Daron, Tirhan and Daquqa, all of which had bishops earlier in the fourteenth century, may have been a result of Timur's campaigns. In ʿIlam, the metropolitan diocese of Jundishapur (last mentioned in 1318) and the dioceses of Susa and Shushter (last mentioned towards the end of the thirteenth century) may also have come to an end at this period.

By contrast, East Syriac Christianity continued to flourish in northern Mesopotamia. Although East Syriac communities disappeared from several villages in the Nisibis and Mosul districts in the fourteenth and fifteenth centuries, patterns of settlement seem generally to have persisted without radical disturbance. Although insufficient information has survived to be certain, there may well have been a continuous succession of bishops in the dioceses of Nisibis, Mosul and Erbil, and perhaps also in the dioceses of Hesna d'Kifa, Gazarta, Salmas and Urmi. Timur's campaigns may have stimulated a migration of East Syriac Christians from the plains into the hills of the Bohtan and Hakkari districts, as a new diocese was created in the fifteenth century for Atel and Bohtan, and perhaps around the same time for Berwari.

During the fourteenth and fifteenth centuries, there was also a metropolitan diocese for an East Syriac merchant community in Cyprus. This community came under strong pressure from the Latin Church, and the diocese lapsed after the metropolitan Timothy converted to Catholicism in 1445.

By the middle of the sixteenth century, the East Syriac communities in India were all that survived of the Church of the East's exterior provinces (though the names of the old provinces of Armenia, Arzun, Jerusalem and China persisted or were later revived in the titles of the metropolitans of Nisibis, Hesna d'Kifa, Amid and India respectively). In the west there were small East Syriac communities in Jerusalem, Aleppo, and Cyprus, but without bishops. Small communities could still be found in the Erbil, Kirkuk and Tabriz districts, but the main strength of the church was confined to northern Mesopotamia, in the districts which had earlier comprised the metropolitan provinces of Nisibis and Mosul. Although there was continuous East Syriac settlement in these districts between the thirteenth and sixteenth centuries the traditional dioceses of Beth Nuhadra, Beth Bgash, Marga (Tella and Barbelli), Hnitha and Salakh in the province of Mosul, and Balad and Tamanon in the province of Nisibis, ceased to exist at an unknown date during this period.

=== East Syriac mission to India, 1490–1503 ===
Between 1490 and 1503, the Church of the East responded to the request of a mission to Mesopotamia from the East Syriac Christians of the Malabar Coast of India for bishops to be sent out to them. In 1490, two Christians from Malabar arrived in Gazarta to petition the Patriarch Shemʿon IV to consecrate a bishop for their church. Two monks of the monastery of Mar Awgin were consecrated bishops and were sent to India. Shemʿon IV died in 1497, to be followed by the short-reigned Shemʿon V, who died in 1502. His successor, Eliya V, consecrated three more bishops for India in April 1503. These bishops sent a report to the Patriarch from India in 1504, describing the condition of the East Syriac Church in India and reporting the recent arrival of the Portuguese. Eliya had already died by the time this letter arrived in Mesopotamia, and it was received by his successor, Shemʿon VI (1504–1538).

== East Syriac bishops, 1318–1552 ==
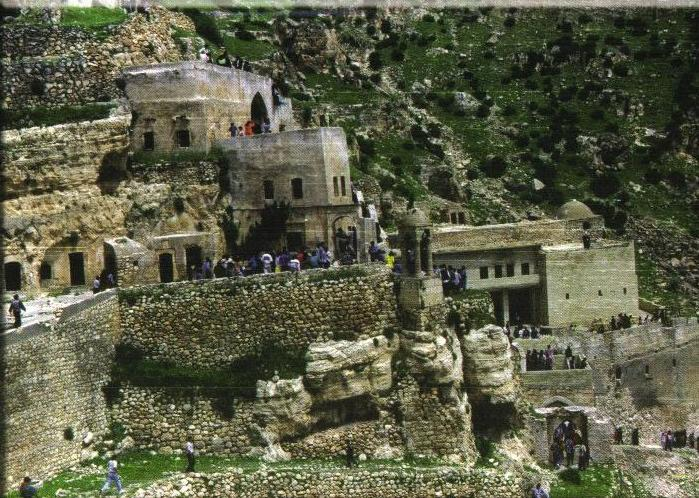
The monastery of Rabban Hormizd, Alqosh

The disappearance of so many old dioceses was probably a consequence of the introduction of hereditary succession in the middle of the fifteenth century by the Patriarch Shemʿon IV, which eventually resulted in a shortage of bishops in the Church of the East. The Patriarch Shemʿon VII Ishoʿyahb is said to have entrusted the administration of some vacant dioceses to laymen, and to have consecrated two nephews as metropolitans, aged twelve and fifteen respectively, presumably because no older relatives were available. In 1552, the Church of the East had only three bishops; the bishops of Salmas, Erbil and Adarbaigan, who all supported Sulaqa's election.

=== The Diocese of Nisibis ===
The diocese of Nisibis, the seat of an East Syriac metropolitan bishop since 410, survived into the second decade of the seventeenth century. By then, Nisibis was little more than a village and the future of East Syriac Christianity in the region lay with the Chaldean communities recently established in the towns of Amid and Mardin. Both these towns had energetic Chaldean bishops at this period, and the historic diocese of Nisibis was in consequence formally abolished at the Chaldean Synod of Amid in 1616. The title of Nisibis was thereafter included in the title of the metropolitans of Mardin.

Several metropolitans of Nisibis are attested between 1318 and 1616. The celebrated East Syriac author ʿAbdishoʿ Bar Brikha, who flourished during the reign of the patriarch Yahballaha III (1281–1317), was metropolitan of Nisibis during the early years of the fourteenth century and was present at the consecration of the Patriarch Timothy II in 1318. The date of his death is not known, but according to a list of metropolitans of Nisibis compiled in the second half of the fourteenth century, his immediate successors were Mikha'il, ʿAbdishoʿ, Yahballaha and Ishoʿyahb.

Three metropolitans of Nisibis are known from the fifteenth century. A metropolitan named Timothy is mentioned in the colophon of a manuscript copied in 1429/1430. A metropolitan named ʿAbdishoʿ donated a manuscript to the church of Mar Pethion in Amid in May 1458. The metropolitan Eliya of 'Nisibis, Armenia, Mardin, Amid, Siirt and Hesna d'Kifa' is mentioned in the colophons of three manuscripts copied between 1477 and 1483.

No metropolitans of Nisibis are attested during the first half of the sixteenth century, and the office may well have remained vacant for much of this period. If so, the vacancy was filled shortly after the schism of 1552. A metropolitan of Nisibis named Ishoʿyahb, son of the priest Samuel of Mosul, is mentioned in the colophons of a series of manuscripts copied between 1554 and 1575, associated with the traditionalist Patriarch Shemʿon VII Ishoʿyahb and his successor Eliya VI (1558–1591). Unusually for a metropolitan of Nisibis, his title also included Amid and Mardin, both of which had Catholic bishops consecrated by Sulaqa, and he was probably consecrated by Shemʿon VII Ishoʿyahb in response to the strong Catholic challenge mounted by Sulaqa in the western districts.

=== The Diocese of Erbil ===
The metropolitan Joseph of Erbil became patriarch in 1318, taking the name Timothy II. The diocese of Erbil seems to have persisted into the seventeenth century, but only four subsequent metropolitans of Erbil are known. The metropolitan Yohannan Bar Yak, who flourished at an unknown date in the fourteenth century, was the author of several verses preserved in a manuscript in the Mardin collection. In the fifteenth century, the writer Ishoʿyahb Bar Mqaddam, one of the few known East Syriac authors at this period, is mentioned as metropolitan of Erbil in 1443 and 1452, and may have taken the name Thomas. The three remaining bishops in the East Syriac hierarchy who supported Sulaqa's election in 1552 included an unnamed metropolitan of Erbil.

=== The Diocese of Atel and Bohtan ===
An East Syriac diocese for Atel and the Bohtan district, which persisted into the seventeenth century, appears to have been founded in the fifteenth century. The earliest-known bishop of Atel, Quriaqos, is mentioned in the colophon of a manuscript copied in 1437.

A metropolitan of Atel named Yohannan is mentioned in a colophon of 1497, and was probably the metropolitan Mar Yohannan present five years later at the consecration of the patriarch Eliya V in September 1502. An elderly bishop named Yohannan, perhaps the same man, was killed at Atel on 6 June 1512 with 40 other persons, including Christian priests and deacons, by the soldiers of Muhammad Bek.

A few years later, three colophons mention another bishop of Atel named Yohannan: as bishop of the 'Bokhtaye' in 1521, as bishop of 'Atel and the Bokhtaye' in 1526, and as bishop of 'Atel and Dilan' in 1534. He is perhaps to be identified with the bishop Yohannan 'of the fortress of Atel' who was burned at the stake at Amid in 1572.

=== The Diocese of Cyprus ===
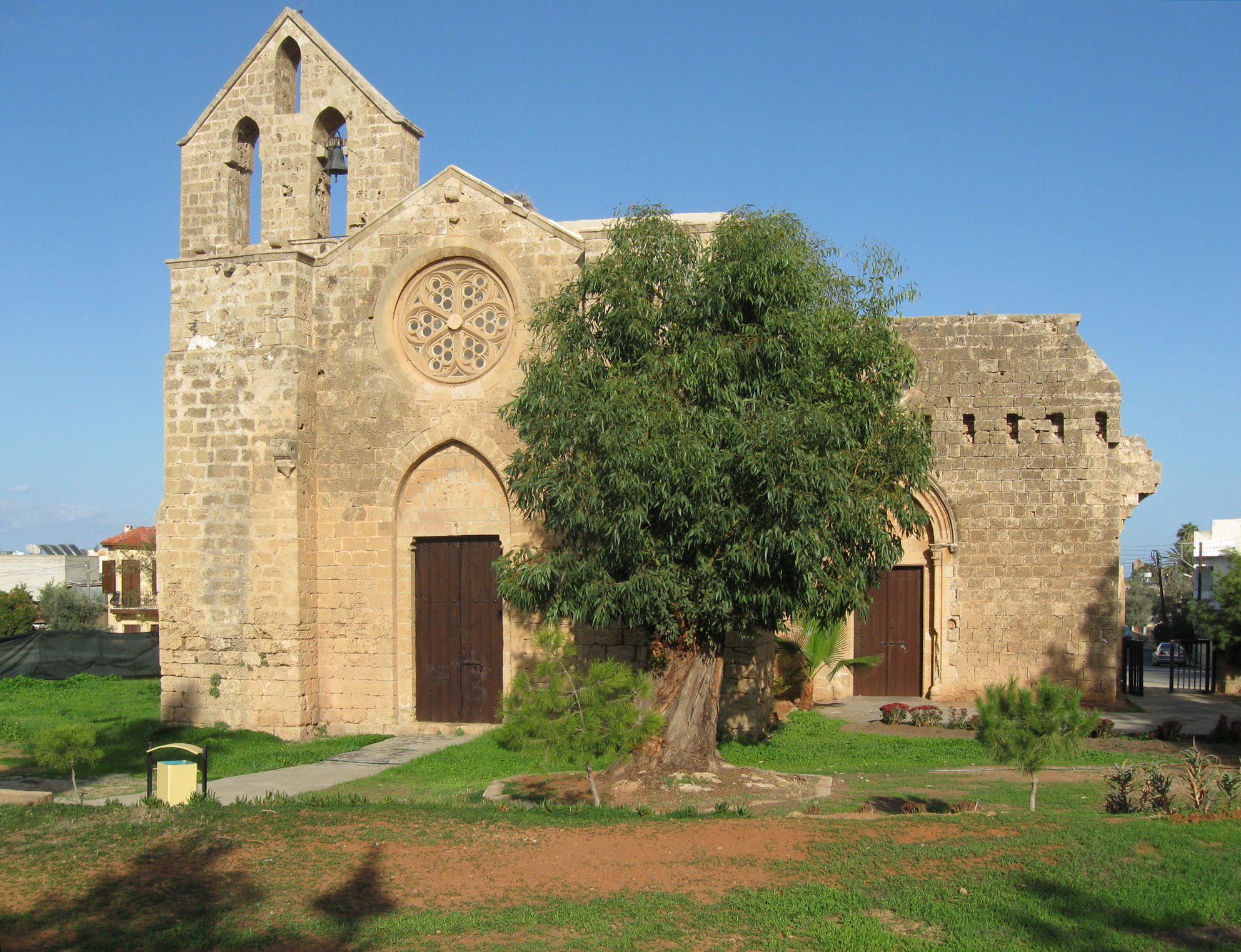
A Nestorian church (1350) in Famagusta, Cyprus.

An East Syriac merchant community was established in Cyprus after the fall of Acre in 1292. After the destruction of the Frankish kingdoms in Syria and Palestine, Cyprus became the forward base for crusading activity during the fourteenth and fifteenth centuries, and Famagusta replaced Acre as a centre for trade with the cities of northern Syria and Cilicia. By the end of the fourteenth century, the island was the seat of a Nestorian metropolitan, who seems to have inherited the title of Tarsus. The Latin Church exerted considerable pressure on this heretical community. In 1340, the Nestorian metropolitan Eliya made a Catholic profession of faith, and in 1445, the metropolitan Timothy also converted to Catholicism. Most of the Nestorians of Cyprus followed the example of their bishops. To distinguish these converts from their recalcitrant Nestorian brethren, Pope Eugene IV christened them 'Chaldeans', because they used the Chaldean language (as Syriac was then called in western Europe). By the middle of the sixteenth century, the island's remaining Nestorians were confined to the town of Famagusta. This community was dispersed within a few decades of the town's capture by the Turks in 1571, but a fine fourteenth-century Nestorian church, built in Provençal style by the wealthy merchant prince Francis Lakhas, can still be seen in Famagusta.

== See also ==
- Dioceses of the Church of the East to 1318
- Dioceses of the Church of the East after 1552

== Sources ==
- Assemani, Giuseppe Luigi (1775). De catholicis seu patriarchis Chaldaeorum et Nestorianorum commentarius historico-chronologicus. Roma.
- Assemani, J. S. (1719–1728). Bibliotheca Orientalis Clementino-Vaticana (4 vols). Rome.
- Dauvillier, J., 'Les provinces chaldéennes "de l'extérieur" au Moyen Âge', in Mélanges Cavallera (Toulouse, 1948), reprinted in Histoire et institutions des Églises orientales au Moyen Âge (Variorum Reprints, London, 1983)
- Fiey, J. M. (1962). Assyrie chrétienne (3 vols). Beirut.
- Fiey, Jean Maurice (1970). "L'Élam, la première des métropoles ecclésiastiques syriennes orientales" (PDF). Parole de l'Orient. 1 (1): 123–153. Archived from the original (PDF) on 2021-06-19.
- Fiey, Jean Maurice (1977). Nisibe, métropole syriaque orientale et ses suffragants des origines à nos jours. Louvain: Secrétariat du CorpusSCO. ISBN 978-2-8017-0061-7.
- Fiey, Jean Maurice (1979) [1963]. Communautés syriaques en Iran et Irak des origines à 1552. London: Variorum Reprints. ISBN 978-0-86078-051-9.
- Fiey, Jean Maurice (1993). Pour un Oriens Christianus Novus: Répertoire des diocèses syriaques orientaux et occidentaux. Beirut: Orient-Institut. ISBN 978-3-515-05718-9.
- Giamil, Samuel (1902). Genuinae relationes inter Sedem Apostolicam et Assyriorum orientalium seu Chaldaeorum ecclesiam. Roma: Ermanno Loescher.
- Moule, A. C. (1930). Christians in China before the Year 1550. London: Octagon. ISBN 0-374-95972-2.
- Scher, A. (1910). "Épisodes de l'histoire du Kurdistan". Journal Asiatique (10, 15): 9–39.
- Tfinkdji, Joseph (1914). "L' église chaldéenne catholique autrefois et aujourd'hui". Annuaire Pontifical Catholique. 17: 449–525.
- Tisserant, Eugène (1931). "Église nestorienne". Dictionnaire de théologie catholique. Vol. 11. pp. 157–323.
- Vosté, Jacques Marie (1930). "Les inscriptions de Rabban Hormizd et de N.-D. des Semences près d'Alqoš (Iraq)". Le Muséon. 43: 263–316.
- Wallis Budge, E. A. (1928). The Monks of Kublai Khan. London. ISBN 0-404-56905-6.
- Wilmshurst, David (2000). The Ecclesiastical Organisation of the Church of the East, 1318–1913. Louvain: Peeters Publishers. ISBN 978-90-429-0876-5.
- Wilmshurst, David (2011). The martyred Church: A History of the Church of the East. London: East & West Publishing Limited. ISBN 978-1-907318-04-7.
