= Rādhān =

Historical region in Mesopotamia (Iraq)

Rādhān (or al-Rādhān, Arabic: راذان) was a region in south central Mesopotamia (Iraq) in the early Middle Ages. It was an administrative district under the ʿAbbāsids and also a diocese of the Church of the East. It is also known to have had a Jewish population and was probably the country of origin of the Rādhānite merchants. The name, however, does not appear in any Hebrew texts.

The exact location of Rādhān is not certain, but it was not far from Baghdad. It may have been roughly the same as the area known since the later Middle Ages as the Sawād, a fertile territory southeast of Baghdad on the eastern bank of the Tigris. Other authorities place it north of Baghdad, still east of the Tigris or further south of Baghdad and west of the Tigris in the region of Maishan.

Cities that have been located in Rādhān include al-Madāʾin (ancient Seleucia-Ctesiphon), Dastagird, Baʿqūbā, Nahrwān, ʿUkbarā and Kilwādhā (now the eastern part of Baghdad).

== Terminology ==
The spelling Rādhān reflects the Arabic. The Syriac form would be Radhan or Radhān. In one Arabic source it is Rāhdān. In Syriac and Christian Arabic sources, the term is usually singular. In early Islamic sources, however, the plural form Rādhānāt and the dual form Rādhānān are more common. They probably reflect the division of the territory into either a lower, middle and upper part or just a lower and upper part, respectively. Theodor Nöldeke argued that the name was of Assyria origin and gave its hypothetical Assyrian form as ra-da-a-nu.

In Syriac sources, Rādhān is identical to the region called Jūkhā in Arabic (Syriac Gōkhay or Gawkai). (Note: Wilmshurst, Martyred Church, distinguishes between the diocese of Rādhān and the diocese of Gawkai in the ninth century. He identifies the latter with the well-known diocese of Nahargur (or Nahrgūr), also called ʿAbdasi. Jean-Maurice Fiey also distinguishes the dioceses.) Rādhān-Gōkhay and Ṭīrhān are described as the two parts of the hyparchy (province) of Beth Aramaye in the Sasanian Empire. In Arabic usage, Jūkhā can refer to a land adjoining Rādhān or else a larger region of which Rādhān is a part. According to al-Ṭabarī, Upper Rādhān was in the arḍ (land) of Jūkhā.

The term Rādhān had fallen out of use in favour of Sawād by later medieval times. Yāqūt al-Hamawī, writing around 1225, describes Lower Rādhān (Rādhān al-asfal) and Upper Rādhān (Rādhān al-aʿlā) as two districts in the Sawād of Baghdad. Two later Arabic writers, al-Bakrī and al-Suyūṭī, mistakenly describe it as a village, the former locating it in Baghdad and the latter (more correctly) in Sawād.

== History ==
=== ʿAbbāsid district ===
The Syriac Chronicle of Seert, records that the Sasanian marzbān (march commander) of Beth Aramaye (south-central Mesopotamia) had his seat in the region of Rādhān. After the Arab conquest of the Sasanian Empire (633–654), the fertility of Rādhān greatly impressed several Arab authors. The poet al-Akhṭal praised its fertility in a poem he wrote during a stay there and al-Farazdaq praises its date palms. "What is in Medina is in Medina and what is in Rādhān is in Rādhān" is a saying attributed to Muḥammad, instructing his followers not to covet the fertility of Rādhān.

By the ʿAbbāsid period, Rādhān was an administrative district with a governor. Writing in the 10th century, al-Muqaddasī and al-Iṣṭakhrī describe it as belonging to the province of Fars. Its agricultural sector fed Baghdad. According to Ibn Kurdādhbe (d. 912), it was a district (ṭassūj) composed of 19 townships (rasātīq) containing 302 threshing floors producing 4,800 kurrs (about 1.4 million kilograms) of wheat and paying 120,000 waraq (low-value) dirhams in tax to the central treasury each year.

The complete succession of ʿAbbāsid governors of Rādhān is not known. The Persian historian al-Ṭabarī records that in 865 its governor was caught embezzling funds. In 897, he records that ʿAlī ibn Muḥammad ibn Abīʾl-Shawārib was appointed qāḍī over Baghdad and the Rādhāns. In 929, Abū Hījā was appointed governor of the Rādhāns and several other places in central Iraq.

Ibn al-Athir (d. 1233) describes Rādhān as one of the provinces of the Khurasan Road and gives its northern limit as the Batt canal, the northern branch of the Ḥawlāyā (or Diyālā) canal, connecting the Nahrwān canal to the Tigris. The Nahrwān canal itself was the eastern boundary of Rādhān. Syriac sources likewise describe Rādhān as bound by the Tigris and the Nahrwān canal.

Ibn al-Athir records a Khwarizmian incursion into Rādhān in 1225.

=== Nestorian diocese ===
A Nestorian Syriac tradition, recorded by Mārī ibn Sulaymān, says that the Rādhāns (al-rādhānayn) were evangelised by the legendary Saint Mari, one of the Seventy Disciples. A variant of this tradition attributes the evangelisation of the Rādhāns to both Mari and his teacher, Addai. According to this variant, some Jews destroyed the well of Sāvā that the apostles had built. Another legend attributes the construction of some 300 churches and monasteries in the Rādhāns to a certain Helqānā. Syriac sources name Ḥālē (Arabic Ḥawlāyā) as the capital of Rādhān. Abba the Great was said to be a native of Ḥālē.

A diocese for Rādhān was set up during the Umayyad period. It belonged to the Province of the Patriarch. Its first known incumbent was Nestorius, who died during the reign of the Patriarch Timothy I (780–823). Following the death of Patriarch Yohannan II in 892, the bishop of Rādhān, also named Yohannan, was initially the leading candidate to replace him, but he lost the election to Yohannan, metropolitan of Mosul. The diocese is included in the list of dioceses compiled by Eliya of Damascus in 893.

The diocese of Rādhān still existed in the early 13th century, but by then Christianity in the region was in steep decline. Rādhān was one of only three diocese left in the Province of the Patriarch by the end of the century. Just as the name Rādhān was being replaced in Arabic by Sawād, so it was replaced about this time in Syriac by the name Beth Daron or Beth Dārūn. (Note: The Syriac World places the region called Beth Daron north of Baghdad and west of the Diyālā (where it also places Rādhān). Wilmshurst locates the dioceses of Rādhān, Nahargur and Beth Daron in the same place well south of Baghdad and west (south) of the Tigris.) The final destruction of the Christian community in Rādhān and the lapse of the diocese can probably be dated to the campaigns of Timur (d. 1405).
