= Armenia (East Syriac diocese) =

Church of the East diocese in Armenia

Diocese of Armenia was an East Syriac diocese (and briefly a metropolitan province) of the Church of the East between the fifth and fourteenth centuries. The diocese served members of the Church of the East in Armenia, and its bishops sat at Halat. The diocese is last mentioned in 1281, and probably lapsed in the fourteenth century during the disorders that attended the fragmentation of the Mongol empire.

== Background ==
The East Syriac diocese of Armenia, whose bishops sat in the town of Halat on the northern shore of Lake Van, is attested between the fifth and fourteenth centuries. In the fifth century the diocese of Halat was not assigned to a metropolitan province, but was later included in the province of Nisibis, probably shortly after the Arab conquest of Persia. The patriarch Timothy I created a short-lived metropolitan province for Armenia, presumably by raising the status of the diocese of Halat. By the second half of the eleventh century Halat was once again a suffragan diocese of the province of Nisibis. By the thirteenth century the jurisdiction of the bishops of Halat included the towns of Van and Wastan. The thirteenth-century Nestorian metropolitan Shlemun of Basra, author of the Book of the Bee (c.1222), was a native of Halat.

== Bishops of Armenia ==
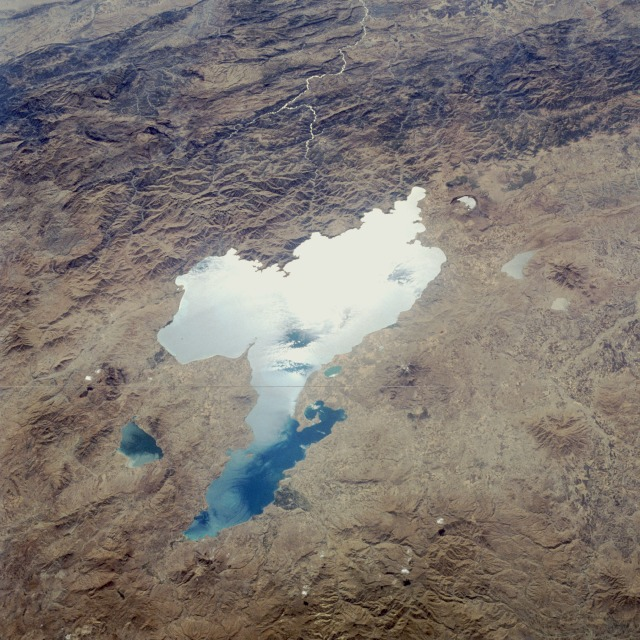
Lake Van viewed from space. The town of Halat can be clearly seen towards the left of the picture, on the northern shore of the lake

The bishop Artashahr of Armenia was among the signatories of the acts of the synod of Dadishoʿ in 424. At this period the diocese, probably based on Halat, was not assigned to a metropolitan province.

The bishop Yaʿqob of Halat, a writer mentioned in the list of Syriac authors compiled in the fourteenth century by ʿAbdishoʿ Bar Brikha, flourished during the reign of the patriarch Pethion (731–40).

An unnamed bishop of Armenia was present at the consecration of the patriarch ʿAbdishoʿ II in 1074.

A note of 1137 by the copyist of the Mukhtasar mentions the recent suppression of the metropolitan province of Bardaʿa (in Azerbaijan) and the attribution of responsibility for the remaining Christians in the province to Eliya, bishop of Halat.

The bishop Yuwanis of Halat was appointed metropolitan of Kashgar and Nevaketh by the patriarch Eliya III (1176–90).

The bishop Sliba-zkha of Halat was present at the consecration of the patriarch Denha I in 1265.

The bishop Hnanishoʿ of Halat was present at the consecration of the patriarch Yahballaha III in 1281.
