= Kashgar (disambiguation) =

Kashgar is a city in extreme western Xinjiang, China.

Kashgar may also refer to

- Kashgar Prefecture, the wider region
- Kashgars, Uigurs who migrated to the Russian Empire during the 18th and 19th centuries

== See also ==
- Kashgar-Kyshtak
- Kaskar (disambiguation)
- Kashkar (disambiguation)
- Cascar (disambiguation)
