= Shubhalishoʿ =

Shubhalishoʿ (Arabic: شوحاليشوع – Shuwḥālīshōʿ, Syriac: ܫܘܒܚܐ ܠܝܫܘܥ) (Note: Also spelled Shubhhal-Isho or Shubḥa-līshōʿ, meaning "praise to Jesus".) was an East Syriac monk, missionary and martyr of the late 8th century.

According to Thomas of Margā's Book of Governors, Shubhalishoʿ was an Ishmaelite (i.e., an Arab) and his native language was Arabic. He was probably a native Christian of Ḥirtā, (Note: See ʿIbād.) since he was "trained in the Holy Scriptures and instructed" in Arabic literature. He was also fluent in Syriac and Persian. He became a monk at the monastery of Beth ʿAbe. There he suffered abuse at the hands of his fellow monks until the Patriarch Timothy I rebuked them.

Shortly after 780, Shubhalishoʿ was commissioned by the patriarch to lead a team of monks to evangelise the regions of Daylam and Gilan. For this purpose, Timothy consecrated him metropolitan bishop of Daylam and Gilan. According to Thomas, he went "with exceedingly great splendour, for barbarian nations need to see a little worldly pomp and show to attract them ... to Christianity". This was paid for by wealthy local Syriac Christians. The Daylamites were predominantly Zoroastrians and pagans, although Thomas describes Shubhalishoʿ as also preaching to Marcionites and Manichaeans. His preaching was accompanied by miracles, since, according to Thomas, "the Divine dispensation is accustomed to shew forth mighty works at the beginning of Divine operations." Thomas says that "he taught and baptised many towns and numerous villages", built churches, established ministers, ordered the teaching of the Psalms and hymns and went "deep inland to the farthest end of the East."

Shubhalishoʿ remained for many years in Daylam and Gilan. He was assassinated by some disgruntled Zoroastrians after returning to his monastery. A monk, Qardagh, from within the mission was appointed to succeed him as metropolitan and the mission continued. Shubhalishoʿ's life is known through several distinct passages in the Book of Governors, which Thomas wrote around 840. Thomas is full of praise for Shubhalishoʿ's education and abilities and gives him the title Rabban Mar. He names as one of his sources "the letter which some merchants and secretaries of the kings, who had penetrated as far as [those countries of the Dailamites and Gilanians] for the sake of commerce and of affairs of State, wrote to Mar Timothy." He also names the Patriarch Abraham II as one of his sources. Shubhalishoʿ is also mentioned in Letter 47 of Timothy I, written shortly before the patriarch's death in 828. Timothy calls him Shubhalishoʿ of Beth Daylamaye and says that he "plaited a crown of martyrdom."

== Bibliography ==
- Blois, F. C. de (2004). "Marḳiyūniyya". In Bearman, P. J.; Bianquis, Th.; Bosworth, C. E.; van Donzel, E. & Heinrichs, W. P. (eds.). The Encyclopaedia of Islam, Second Edition. Volume XII: Supplement. Leiden: E. J. Brill. pp. 599–600. ISBN 978-90-04-13974-9.
- Brock, Sebastian (1997). A Brief Outline of Syriac Literature. Kottyam: St Ephrem's Ecumenical Research Institute.
- Brock, Sebastian (2015). "Syriac Tradition". In Leslie Houlden; Antone Minard (eds.). Jesus in History, Legend, Scripture, and Tradition: A World Encyclopedia. Vol. 2. ABC-CLIO. pp. 556–560.
- Cochrane, Steve (2014). From Beit Abhe to Angamali: Connections, Functions and Roles of the Church of the East's Monasteries in Ninth-Century Christian–Muslim Relations (PDF) (PhD diss.). Middlesex University.
- Mingana, Alphonse (1925). "The Early Spread of Christianity in Central Asia and the Far East: A New Document" (PDF). Bulletin of the John Rylands Library. 9 (2): 297–371. doi:10.7227/BJRL.9.2.2.
- Wilmshurst, David (2011). The Martyred Church: A History of the Church of the East. East and West Publishing.
- Wood, Philip (2019). "Changing Geographies: West Syrian Ecclesiastical Historiography, AD 700–850". In Peter Van Nuffelen (ed.). Historiography and Space in Late Antiquity. Cambridge University Press. pp. 136–163.
