= Kaskar =

Kaskar or Kaškar may refer to:

- Chitral, city in present Pakistan, formerly capital of a princely state in British India, now of a district
- Kaškar, an Ancient Arabian city, former bishopric and Catholic titular see in present Oman
- Battle of Kaskar, fought between the Rashidun Caliphate and the Sassanian Empire
- Shabir Ibrahim Kaskar (died 1981), Indian criminal
- Dawood Ibrahim Kaskar, a criminal and terrorist

== See also ==
- Kashkar (disambiguation)
- Cascar (disambiguation)
- Kashgar (disambiguation)
