= Elias IV =

Elias IV may refer to:

- Count Elias IV of Périgord (1083–1155)
- Eliya IV, patriarch of the Church of the East (c. 1405–c. 1425)
