= Shemon II =

Mar Shemʿon II
- Patriarch of the Church of the East
- Church: Church of the East
- See: Seleucia-Ctesiphon
- Installed: c.1385
- Term ended: c.1405
- Predecessor: Denha II
- Successor: Shemon III

Personal details
- Born: 14th century
- Died: 15th century
- Residence: Mosul

Mar Shemʿon II (sometimes written Shimun II) was the patriarch of the Church of the East from c. 1385 until c. 1405. He succeeded Denha II, who died in 1381/2, and his reign corresponds to the beginning of a period of obscurity in the Church of the East and the patriarchal succession.

He is mentioned in one near-contemporary list of patriarchs in a 15th-century manuscript copy of the Book of the Bee. He is listed between Denha II and Eliya IV, and the copy was produced in the time of Eliya's successor, Shemʿon III. The traditional listing makes Shemʿon III the successor of Shemʿon II and predecessor of Eliya IV, but the contemporary source is preferred.

Shemʿon II probably selected his name in honour of the 4th-century patriarch Shemʿon bar Sabbaʿe, a victim of the Forty Years' Persecution. Possibly he foresaw a similar period of persecution. His choice of name became very common thereafter. In view of the upheavals in Iraq in his time, it is unlikely that he was consecrated in Baghdad. Probably he was consecrated and resided in a monastery in northern Iraq. His reign fell in a period of intense persecution of Christians under the Timurid Empire. The 1390s saw a "flight to the mountains", as Nestorians took refuge from the upheavals in the region of Hakkari in northern Iraq. In 1401, Pope Boniface IX granted an indulgence to Greek Orthodox and Nestorian Christians who sheltered Latins fleeing the Timurids.

== Bibliography ==
- Baum, Wilhelm; Winkler, Dietmar W. (2003). The Church of the East: A Concise History. London and New York: Taylor & Francis. ISBN 0-203-42309-7.
- Burleson, Samuel; Van Rompay, Lucas (2011). "List of Patriarchs: I. The Church of the East and its Uniate Continuations". In Sebastian P. Brock; Aaron M. Butts; George A. Kiraz; Lucas Van Rompay (eds.). Gorgias Encyclopedic Dictionary of the Syriac Heritage. Gorgias Press.
- Wilmshurst, David J. (2000). The Ecclesiastical Organisation of the Church of the East, 1318–1913. Peeters.
- Wilmshurst, David J. (2011). The Martyred Church: A History of the Church of the East. East and West Publishing.
- Wilmshurst, David J. (2019). "The Patriarchs of the Church of the East". In Daniel King (ed.). The Syriac World. Routledge. pp. 799–805.

Church of the East titles
| Preceded by Denha II (1336/7–1381/2) | Catholicos-Patriarch of the East (c.1385–c.1405) | Succeeded by Shemon III (c.1405–1425) |
