= Dayr Al-Jathaliq =

Historical East Syriac monastery in Iraq

Dayra d-Klila d-Iso
- ܕܲܝܪܵܐ ܕܟܠܝܼܠܵܐ ܕܝܼܫܘܿܥ
- Location within modern Iraq

Monastery information
- Denomination: Church of the East
- Diocese: Seleucia-Ctesiphon

Architecture
- Status: Defunct

Site
- Location: Near Samarra, 50–55 kilometers (31–34 mi) north of present-day Baghdad, Iraq
- Coordinates: 33°49′24″N 44°14′24″E

Dayra d-Klila d-Iso (ܕܲܝܪܵܐ ܕܟܠܝܼܠܵܐ ܕܝܼܫܘܿܥ Monastery of the Crown of Jesus) was an ancient Christian monastery located south of Samarra, 50 km north of Baghdad, Iraq. It is also known as 'Dayr Al-Jathaliq' or Monastery of the Catholicos as the headquarters of the Catholicos of the East, the supreme head of the Church of the East.

The Catholicoi of the Church of the East, namely, Timothy I, Iso Barnun, Giwargis II, Sabrisho II, and Theodosius were buried in this monastery.

The modern remains of this monastery, are located in the 'Remains of Maskin' ('Qara'ib Maskin') Tell al-Dayr, 6 km southeast of the village of Sumayka.

The premises of the monastery was the venue for decisive battle between Umayad Caliph Abdal-Malik Ibn Marwan and Mussab Ibn Al-Zubair, the brother of Meccan Caliph Abdallah Ibn Al-Zubair in AD 691. A memorial to Mussab, who was killed in this battle, was built there and it became a famous pilgrimage site under the name Khirbat Mussab.
