= Surin of Seleucia-Ctesiphon =

Iranian aristocrat and Patriarch of the Church of the East in 753

Surin was an Iranian aristocrat from the Suren family, who briefly served as the Patriarch of the Church of the East in 753. Although he was not recognized as a legitimate patriarch by his contemporaries, he is included in the traditional list of patriarchs of the Church of the East.

== Sources ==
Brief accounts of Surin's reign are given in the Ecclesiastical Chronicle of the Jacobite writer Bar Hebraeus (floruit 1280) and in the ecclesiastical histories of the Nestorian writers Mari (twelfth-century), ʿAmr (fourteenth-century) and Sliba (fourteenth-century).

== Surin's patriarchate ==
The following account of Surin's reign is given by Mari:

Surin bribed Abanus, the emir of al-Madaïn, to send his henchmen to compel the people to consecrate him on the fifth Sunday of Easter. Some took the eucharist, while others broke the fast. Abanus sent his satellites against those who remained. They rounded them up and, standing by the very gates of the altar with drawn swords, forced them to consecrate Surin, which they did with tears in their eyes. Yaʿqob, metropolitan of Jundishapur, as he spoke the words of the consecration over him, raised his hands to heaven and prayed that no good would befall him. Then the fathers told Saffah what had happened and begged for his help, and he had Abanus flogged and told the fathers to hold a fresh election. And so Surin was deposed in Hira on the Sunday after Ascension. Then the fathers went to al-Madaïn with Yahya ibn Ibrahim and consecrated Yaʿqob. But Surin and his relatives ceaselessly attacked him, and finally al-Mansur threw him into prison. Yaʿqob was eventually released, and was asked by the faithful to send Surin to Basra, since its metropolitan had died. Yaʿqob granted their request, but Surin was hated by the people of Basra, and while he was received by some, he was shunned by others. Meanwhile, al-Mansur was now better informed about him, and ordered that he should be thrown into prison. He fled from ʿIsa ibn Shahlafa, but the emir of al-Madaïn soon captured him and imprisoned him. After his death he was buried in the monastery of Shemʿon, and his name was inscribed in the roll of the metropolitans of Basra.

== See also ==
- List of patriarchs of the Church of the East

== Notes ==
Church of the East titles
Preceded by Aba II (741–751)	Catholicos-Patriarch of the East (753)	Succeeded by Yaʿqob II (753–773)
