= Theodosius of Seleucia-Ctesiphon =

Theodosius was Patriarch of the Church of the East between 853 and 858.

== Sources ==
Brief accounts of the patriarchate of Theodosius are given in the Ecclesiastical Chronicle of the Jacobite writer Bar Hebraeus (floruit 1280) and in the ecclesiastical histories of the Nestorian writers Mari (twelfth-century), ʿAmr (fourteenth-century) and Sliba (fourteenth-century). Modern assessments of Theodosius's reign can be found in Jean-Maurice Fiey's Chrétiens syriaques sous les Abbassides and David Wilmshurst's The Martyred Church.

== Theodosius's patriarchate ==
The following account of the patriarchate of Theodosius is given by Bar Hebraeus:

At the same time the catholicus Abraham died, after fulfilling his office for thirteen years, and was succeeded by Theodosius of Beth Garmai, who was consecrated at Seleucia on the second Sunday of Lent, in the year 238 of the Arabs [AD 853]. In his time the caliph al-Mutawakkil grew angry with his doctor Bokhtishoʿ, and threw him in jail, and confiscated all his possessions. The catholicus was also imprisoned alongside him, and remained in chains for the space of three years.

After Theodosius, the catholicus of the Nestorians, left prison, he lived a further two years and then died, and was buried in the monastery of Klilishoʿ on 7 October in the year 1170 of the Greeks [AD 858].

== See also ==
- List of patriarchs of the Church of the East

== Notes ==
Church of the East titles
Preceded by Abraham II (837–850); Vacant (850–853)	Catholicos-Patriarch of the East (853–858)	Succeeded by Sargis (860–872)
