= Monastery of Beth Abe =

Syriac Monastery in Iraq

Monastery of Beth Abe (Classical Syriac: ܒܝܬ ܥܒܐ, romanized: beṯ ʿaḇe), was a monastery of the Church of the East in Marga in Upper Mesopotamia. It may have been located near the Great Zab about 8 kilometres (5.0 mi) northeast of Nineveh. It was founded by Rabban Jacob of Lashom (a suffragan diocese of Beth Garmaï) around 595.

The monastery played a major part in Syriac monasticism and was inhabited by several important figures in the Church of the East, such as Sahdona, John of Dailam, Shubhalishoʿ, Giwargis II and Abraham II. One monk, Thomas of Marga, wrote a history of the monastery. Another, David, Bishop of the Kurds, wrote a series of biographies of holy men known as the Little Paradise.

== Abbots ==
The abbots listed by Thomas of Marga are:

1. Rabban Jacob of Lashom
2. John [I] of Beth Garmai (before 628)
3. Paul
4. Kam-Isho (during the reign of Ishoyahb III, 649–659)
5. Beraz-Surin (during the reign of Giwargis I, 661–680)
6. Rabban Mar Abraham
7. Bar Sauma (during the reign of Hnanisho I, 686–698)
8. Gabriel [I] of Shahrizor, called "the Cow" (during the reign of Hnanisho I)
9. George Bar Sayyadhe of Neshra (during the reign of Hnanisho I)
10. Sama of Neshra, brother of prec. (during the reign of Hnanisho I)
11. Nathaniel (during the reign of Hnanisho I)
12. Selibha the Aramaean (during the reign of Hnanisho I)
13. Gabriel [II], called "the Little Sparrow"
14. Joseph [I] of Shahrizor (during the reign of Sliba-zkha, 714–728)
15. John [II] (during the reign of Sliba-zkha)
16. Aha (during the reign of Aba II, 741–751)
17. Ishoyahb of Tella of Birta (during the reign of Aba II)
18. Cyriacus of Gebhilta (died c. 800)
19. Shubhhal-Maran
20. Joseph [II] (died 832)

== Bibliography ==
- Budge, E. A. Wallis, ed. (1893). The Book of Governors: The Historia Monastica of Thomas, Bishop of Margâ A.D. 840. Vol. 1. London: Kegan Paul, Trench, Trübner & Co.
- Brock, Sebastian (2001). "Syriac into Greek at Mar Saba: The Translation of St. Isaac the Syrian". In Joseph Patrich (ed.). The Sabaite Heritage in the Orthodox Church from the Fifth Century to the Present. Peeters. pp. 201–208.
