= Cascar =

Cascar may refer to:

- CASCAR, the Canadian Association for Stock Car Auto Racing
- Kashgar, an oasis city in Xinjiang, China

== See also ==
- Kaskar (disambiguation)
- Kashkar (disambiguation)
- Kashgar (disambiguation)
