= Hnanisho II =

Patriarch of the Church of the East

Hnanishoʿ II (born c.715) was patriarch of the Church of the East between 773 and 780. His name, sometimes spelled Ananjesu or Khnanishu, means 'mercy of Jesus'.

== Sources ==
Brief accounts of Hnanishoʿ's patriarchate are given in the Ecclesiastical Chronicle of the Jacobite writer Bar Hebraeus (floruit 1280) and in the ecclesiastical histories of the Nestorian writers Mari (twelfth-century), ʿAmr (fourteenth-century) and Sliba (fourteenth-century).

== Hnanisho's patriarchate ==
The following account of Hnanishoʿ's patriarchate is given by Bar Hebraeus, who was more interested in his influential sponsor ʿIsa the pharmacist than in the patriarch himself:

The catholicus Yaʿqob II died after fulfilling his office for nineteen years, and was succeeded by Hnanishoʿ II, bishop of Daquqa [Lashom]. He was consecrated at Seleucia on the recommendation of ʿIsa the pharmacist, and died after fulfilling his office for four years. It is said of this ʿIsa the pharmacist that one day while he was sitting in his shop a woman arrived from the caliph's court with a bottle containing a urine sample. Thinking that he was a doctor, she showed it to him and asked him whether he could diagnose the illness suffered by the urine's owner. ʿIsa, who had no knowledge or experience of the physician's art, studied the urine and said, purely by way of a guess and with downcast eyes, 'This is not the water of a sick man, but belongs to a woman who carries a male child in her womb who will one day rule this kingdom.' Now this woman was the maidservant of Kaizaran, the concubine of the caliph al-Mahdi, and she immediately ran to her mistress and told her what she had just heard. Her mistress replied, 'Run back to that man and tell him that if his prophecy comes true, I will take him into my service and shower wealth upon him.' And so ʿIsa spent all his time in churches and monasteries, in the company of holy men and miracle-workers, and in fasting and praying, until his prediction came true. He was then received with great honour in the caliph's court.

== Hnanisho and the Nestorian mission to China ==
Hnanishoʿ is named in both Syriac and Chinese in a conventional dating formula at the end of the main inscription on the Nestorian Stele erected in Chang'an by the metropolitan Adam of Beth Sinaye in February 781. The Syriac text reads 'In the days of the father of fathers the catholicus-patriarch Mar Hnanishoʿ (b'yawmi aba d'abahatha Mar Hnanishoʿ qatoliqa patrirqis)'. The Chinese text reads 'when the monk Ning-Shu was governing the brilliant congregations of the East'（時法主僧寧恕知東方之㬌衆也）. The news of Hnanishoʿ's death several months earlier had evidently not yet reached the Nestorians of Chang'an.

== See also ==
- List of patriarchs of the Church of the East
- Nestorian Stele

== Notes ==
Church of the East titles
Preceded by Yaʿqob II (753–773)	Catholicos-Patriarch of the East (773–780)	Succeeded by Timothy I (780–823)
