= Yahballaha II =

Mar Yahballaha II
- Patriarch of the Church of the East
- Church: Church of the East
- See: Seleucia-Ctesiphon
- Installed: 1190
- Term ended: 1222
- Predecessor: Eliya III
- Successor: Sabrisho IV

Personal details
- Born: Yahballaha bar Qayyoma
- Died: 1222
- Residence: Seleucia

Yahballaha II bar Qayyoma was Patriarch of the Church of the East from 1190 to 1222.

== Sources ==
Brief accounts of Yahballaha's patriarchate are given in the Ecclesiastical Chronicle of the Jacobite writer Bar Hebraeus (fl. 1280) and in the ecclesiastical histories of the fourteenth-century Nestorian writers ʿAmr and Sliba.

== Yahballaha's patriarchate ==
The following account of Yahballaha's patriarchate is given by Bar Hebraeus:

He [Eliya III] was succeeded by Yahballaha Bar Qayyoma, a man of Mosul who had earlier been bishop of Maiperqat and then metropolitan of Nisibis. He used extraordinary boldness to secure the patriarchate. When he arrived in Baghdad after the death of the catholicus Eliya Abu Halim, he realised that neither the bishops nor the people of Baghdad would consent to his election, so he bought the governor's support with a bribe of 7,000 gold dinars and thus forced the bishops to consecrate him. When he returned to Seleucia and inspected the cell in the Greek Palace, he did not like it, despite its splendid appearance, so he closed it and went to live in the church of the third ward. He died on the second Sunday of the month, on the sixteenth day of the eleventh month of the year 618 of the Arabs [AD 1222], and was buried on the eastern side of the church of the blessed Mary, mother of God.

== See also ==
- List of patriarchs of the Church of the East

Church of the East titles
Preceded by Eliya III (1176–1190)	Catholicos-Patriarch of the East (1190–1222)	Succeeded by Sabrishoʿ IV (1222–1225)
