= Sabrisho V =

Mar Sabrisho V
- Patriarch of the Church of the East
- Church: Church of the East
- See: Seleucia-Ctesiphon
- Installed: 12 April 1226
- Term ended: 23 April 1256
- Predecessor: Sabrisho IV
- Successor: Makkikha II
- Other post: Metropolitan of Daquqa

Personal details
- Born: Sabrishoʿ bar Masihi
- Died: 23 April 1256
- Buried: Church of Sergius and Bacchus, Karkha
- Residence: Baghdad

Sabrishoʿ V ibn al-Masihi (born Sabrishoʿ bar Masihi) was Patriarch of the Church of the East from 1226 to 1256.

== Sources ==
Brief accounts of Sabrishoʿ's patriarchate are given in the Ecclesiastical Chronicle of the Jacobite writer Bar Hebraeus (fl. 1280) and in the ecclesiastical histories of the fourteenth-century Nestorian writers ʿAmr and Sliba.

== Sabrisho's patriarchate ==
The following account of Sabrishoʿ's patriarchate is given by Bar Hebraeus:

In the year 623 of the Arabs [AD 1226], on the twelfth day of the fourth month, on the first Sunday after Easter, Sabrishoʿ bar Masihi, metropolitan of Daquqa, was consecrated catholicus, because he bribed the caliph al-Zahir with gold. This happened because he had won the respect of the caliph's brothers, who were distinguished noblemen, just as he himself was an honourable man, of a pleasant disposition, straightforward and affable, and on that account loved by all. He died on a Sunday, on the twenty-third day of the fourth month of the year 654 of the Arabs [AD 1256], after fulfilling his office for thirty-one years, and was buried in the church of Sergius and Bacchus in Karkha. He was succeeded by Makkikha, metropolitan of Nisibis.

During his patriarchate, somewhere around 1233, Rome established contacts with the Church of the East, by sending Dominicans. In 1247 Sabrisho sent his vicar Rabban Ara to Rome to Pope Innocent IV in order to work on the union between the two churches. Rabban Ara was consecrated a patriarch in Rome, but it's unknown whether this union had a major significance.

== See also ==
- List of patriarchs of the Church of the East

== Notes ==
Church of the East titles
| Preceded by Sabrishoʿ IV (1222–1225) | Catholicos-Patriarch of the East (1226–1256) | Succeeded by Makkikha II (1257–1265) |
