= Kashgartsy =

Group of Uigurs

The Kashgartsy or Kashgars were a group of Uyghurs who migrated from Kashgar to the Russian Empire during the 18th and 19th centuries. Prior to the 1930s they were classed as a separate ethnic group.

== Population ==
The 1926 census counted 13,010 Kashgars in the Soviet Union. Despite their reclassification, there were 18 people who self reported being Kashgars in the 2002 census of Russia. However, since most of the Kashgars had initially migrated to Kazakhstan, Uzbekistan and Kyrgyzstan, this low number in Russia tells us little about how most Kashgars self-identify.

== Sources ==
- Waxman, Ronald. The Peoples of the USSR: AN Ethnographic Handbook p. 98
