= Enosh of Seleucia-Ctesiphon =

Enosh was Patriarch of the Church of the East between 877 and 884.

== Sources ==
Brief accounts of Enosh's patriarchate are given in the Ecclesiastical Chronicle of the Jacobite writer Bar Hebraeus (floruit 1280) and in the ecclesiastical histories of the Nestorian writers Mari (twelfth-century), ʿAmr (fourteenth-century) and Sliba (fourteenth-century). An important incident during Enosh's reign is also mentioned in the Chronicle of Seert, an ecclesiastical history probably written towards the end of the ninth century. Modern assessments of Enosh's reign can be found in Jean-Maurice Fiey's Chrétiens syriaques sous les Abbassides and David Wilmshurst's The Martyred Church.

== Enosh's election ==
The following account of Enosh's controversial election is given by Bar Hebraeus:

At about the same time, in the third year of the caliph al-Muʿtamid, the Nestorian catholicus Sargis died, after fulfilling his office for twelve years. After their church remained widowed for four years, he was succeeded by Enosh, the metropolitan of Mosul. A great dissension arose among the people, with some calling for Enosh and others for Israel, bishop of Kashkar. When two men met, one would ask, 'Are you for Enosh or for Israel?' If the other man gave the wrong answer, the questioner punched him and kicked him as hard as he could. The scribes and the doctors of the caliph took the part of Enosh, and removed Israel. Enosh was thereupon consecrated at Seleucia after the feast of Epiphany in the year 263 of the Arabs [AD 876].

A slightly more substantial account of Enosh's election is given by Mari:

Enosh was appointed metropolitan of Mosul by Sargis. After his death the bishop Israel of Kashkar arrived and summoned the fathers to the customary synod. Many of the faithful decided to vote for him and elect him patriarch, thinking that as a learned and honest man, who was widely admired by the Christians, he deserved that dignity. But Enosh, metropolitan of Mosul, a learned and bold man, came forward to claim the patriarchate for himself, and many of the faithful decided to vote for him. A party was formed to support him, the people were divided into two camps, and discords and evils arose. The people boldly inveighed against the nobles, and each candidate asked the friends of the sultan to support his own bid. Meanwhile, the public peace was also disturbed by al-ʿAlawi of Basra. Then the governor of Baghdad sent a man to bring Israel from Samarra to Baghdad, and told him not to say a word about the patriarchate if the Christians asked him about it. When Israel was descending from the bema during the singing of the responses of the liturgy, one of the supporters of Enosh lost all fear of God, and in the press of the large crowd seized and crushed his testicles. He was carried away in a faint, and after lying ill for forty days he eventually died, and was buried in the chapel of the martyrs in the old church of the monastery of Mar Pethion.

== Enosh's patriarchate ==
Bar Hebraeus gave only the briefest of notices of Enosh's seven-year reign:

The catholicus Enosh, having fulfilled his office, died at the beginning of hziran [June] in the year 270 of the Arabs [AD 884].

Mari has little more to say about Enosh's reign, and mentions only that he adjudicated a dispute between the Nestorians of Hirta (al-Hira) and Kashkar:

When the people of al-Hira and the people of Kashkar began to argue in the church of Asbagh in the Greek Palace over their prerogatives, Enosh considered the claims of both sides, arbitrated between them, gave a written decision which was accepted as having official force, and threatened transgressors with anathematisation. His decision was confirmed by several later synods, the last of which was held in the time of Ibn ʿAli al-Khazin.

The most notable event of Enosh's reign was the 'discovery' in 878 at Birmantha, by a Nestorian monk named Habib, of a treaty nearly two hundred and fifty years old, written in Arabic on a yellowing oxhide, between Muhammad and the Christians of Najran. This treaty, which bore Muhammad's seal, promised the Christians freedom of worship, exemption from military service, and privileges for monks and women. Some modern scholars believe that this 'treaty' was forged by the Nestorians in an attempt to secure better treatment for Christians living under Muslim rule.

== See also ==
- List of patriarchs of the Church of the East

== Notes ==
Church of the East titles
Preceded by Sargis (860–872); Vacant (872–877)	Catholicos-Patriarch of the East; 877–884	Succeeded by Yohannan II (884–891)
