= Denha II =

Patriarch of the Church of the East from 1336/7 to 1381/2

Mar Denha II
- Patriarch of the Church of the East
- Church: Church of the East
- See: Seleucia Ctesiphon
- Installed: 1336/7
- Term ended: 1381/2
- Predecessor: Timothy II
- Successor: Shemon II

Personal details
- Born: 14th century
- Died: 1381/2
- Residence: Karamlesh

Mar Denha II (also written Dinkha II) was patriarch of the Church of the East from 1336/7 to 1381/2. Although no history of his reign has survived, references in a number of Nestorian, Jacobite and Muslim sources provide some details of his patriarchate.

== Order of succession and reign dates ==
According to a list of Nestorian patriarchs preserved in a manuscript of Shlemun of Akhlat's Book of the Bee, Denha II succeeded the patriarch Timothy II. Shlemun's original list terminated with the patriarch Sabrishoʿ IV, who was consecrated in 1222, but this list was later brought up to date by a fifteenth-century scribe, who added a list of thirteenth-, fourteenth- and fifteenth-century patriarchs. According to this list, Yahballaha III (1281–1318) was succeeded by the patriarchs Timothy, Denha, Shemʿon, Eliya, and 'Shemʿon of our days'. This is the only source that specifically places Denha in direct succession to Timothy, but there is no reason to doubt its evidence.

According to a long colophon in a Nestorian manuscript, Denha was consecrated in 1336/7, and died in 1381/2. He was appointed patriarch under the sponsorship of the Christian emir Hajji Togai:

In AG 1648 [AD 1336/7] a very bright luminary was established over the encampment of the church, our late father Mar Denha (may his prayers be with the community). He was given the order by the upright friend of our Lord and sponsor of Mar Denha, Hajji Togai, that the Christians should walk according to their custom. Then our ruined churches were rebuilt, and the altars and shrines perfected. May our Lord Christ grant them, as a reward for their struggle, bliss at his right hand, Amen. Mar Denha died in AG 1693 [AD 1381/2].

Although these dates would give Denha an unusually long reign, they receive strong confirmation from a reference to a Nestorian catholicus named Denha in the dating formula of a colophon of 1380.

== Contacts with the Jacobites, 1358–64 ==
Denha II is mentioned several times in the continuation of the Ecclesiastical History of Bar Hebraeus between 1358 and 1364. At this period he resided in the large Nestorian village of Karamlish (or Karmelish, Syriac: ܟܪܡܠܫ), which had long been a Nestorian stronghold, and his presence brought a considerable degree of prosperity to the village. Like Maragha during the reign of Yahballaha III, Karamlish became an important centre not only for the Nestorians, but also for the Armenians and Jacobites and perhaps the Melkites too. The local village chiefs took advantage of the advent of high society to Karamlish by styling themselves emirs, and a number of Christian 'emirs' of Karamlish are known from this period. Karamlish seems to have returned to its humble origins once the seat of the Nestorian patriarchs was transferred to Mosul at the end of the fourteenth century, and nothing more is heard of its Armenian and Jacobite communities thereafter.

The first mention of Denha II occurs in an account of the progress of the Jacobite patriarch Ignatius Ismail in the East in 1358:

In the year of the Greeks 1669 [AD 1358] the patriarch came down into the East, and came to Karmelish. The chiefs and nobles received him courteously, including the emir Nasr al-Din, the emir Mattai, and the excellent Sultan Shah, who paid him the respect he deserved. Mar Denha, the catholicus of the Nestorians, also hastened to give him a warm welcome.

In 1360 the Jacobite bishop Dioscorus bar Kaina asked the Mardin patriarch Ignatius VI to appoint him maphrian, and was told that he needed the consent of the bishops of the East. set about removing the likely opposition to his appointment by bribery. Confident that he had reached an understanding with the patriarch, he conciliated the civil authorities by gifts of 40,000 gold pieces each to the emirs of Mardin and Mosul. He then went on to bribe the abbot and monks of the monastery of Mar Mattai near Mosul and the Nestorian patriarch Denha II:

He came to Karmelish in the Eastern region, where he stayed for a few days. Then, taking with him a large amount of gold, he went to see the emir Mattai [of Mosul] and Sultan Shah. He also gave some presents to Mar Denha, the catholicus of the Nestorians. He went on to attach the priests and deacons of that place to him by force, and also won over others, who were seduced by his evil counsel. But the priest Yohannan, son of the priest Denha, refused to help him.

Denha II helped to overcome resistance among the Jacobites to the appointment of Dioscorus as maphrian:

But the priest Yohannan continued to resist Bar Kaina, saying 'We are not prepared to recognise you just because Joseph Bar-Sambusag and Baʿaza and the monk David Bar Tamam and other ignorant monks have consecrated you as maphrian. Come back when you have persuaded one or other of the patriarchs to lay his hands on you, and then we will recognise you.' Then they gave him a written undertaking to this effect, on the instructions of the emir Mattai and the catholicus Mar Denha.

In 1364, shortly after his consecration by the Jacobite patriarch Ignatius in the monastery of Mar Hnanya at Mardin, the Jacobite maphrian Athanasius II Ibrahim paid courtesy visits to Mosul, Bartalli, the monastery of Mar Mattai and Karamlish. He was given a courteous reception at Karamlish by the Nestorian patriarch Denha II. The participation of the Nestorian patriarchs in the welcoming ceremonies for a new Jacobite maphrian seems to have started in the thirteenth century (Denha I took part in the enthronement ceremony in Baghdad for the maphrian Bar Hebraeus in 1264), and had evidently become traditional. Despite the doctrinal differences between the two churches, their leaders clearly felt that it was valuable to preserve the appearance of Christian unity in a Muslim world and to begin their official relationship in a cordial atmosphere:

After a few days the maphrian came down to Mosul, and from there proceeded to Bartalli. The priests, deacons and faithful went to meet him, and he stayed there for a while. The priest Yohannan came to him, who had opposed and withstood Bar Kaina, and with him Masud, chief of upper Beth Daniel. And when they had received the maphrian's blessing and discussed affairs with him, they returned to Karmelish. And the priest Yohannan and the chief Masud gave presents to the emir Sultan Shah and the emir Bajazid, and also to Mar Denha, the catholicus of the Nestorians, and then returned to the maphrian. Then each emir sent his wazir, together with all the priests and deacons of the region, and they greeted the maphrian as befitted fellow-Christians. And they went up to the monastery of Mar Mattai, whose monks went out to meet the maphrian Athanasius Ibrahim and to kiss his hand. So he sat on the throne of the catholicate, and they robed him in the traditional fashion. Then he conducted divine service, and ordained priests and deacons. Then the maphrian went down to the Sawhraye, and then went on to Karmelish. And Bajazid, and the priests and deacons of the Nestorians and the Armenians, and all the inhabitants of the blessed village of Karmelish came out to meet him. Then the maphrian went on to pay his respects to the catholicus Mar Denha, who gave him a hearty welcome, prepared a splendid feast for him, and presented him with a beautiful robe. From there the maphrian toured the whole region, and received the traditional warm welcome both from our people and from those of other congregations.

== See also ==
- List of patriarchs of the Church of the East

== Notes ==
Church of the East titles
Preceded by Timothy II (1318 – c. 1332); Vacant (1332 – c. 1336)	Catholicos-Patriarch of the East; 1336/7 – 1381/2	Succeeded by Shemon II (c.1385 – c.1405)
