= Giwargis II (Church of the East) =

Giwargis II (Classical Syriac: ܓܝܘܪܓܝܣ ܬܪܝܢܐ) was Patriarch of the Church of the East from 828 to 831.

== Sources ==
Brief accounts of Giwargis's patriarchate are given in the Ecclesiastical Chronicle of the Jacobite writer Bar Hebraeus (floruit 1280) and in the ecclesiastical histories of the Nestorian writers Mari (twelfth-century), ʿAmr (fourteenth-century) and Sliba (fourteenth-century). Modern assessments of his reign can be found in Jean-Maurice Fiey's Chrétiens syriaques sous les Abbassides and David Wilmshurst's The Martyred Church.

== Giwargis's patriarchate ==
The following account of Giwargis's patriarchate is given by Mari:

Giwargis was a native of al-Karkh, and superior of the monastery of Beth ʿAbe. He was a very prudent and intelligent man, but had little knowledge of doctrine. He once approached Gabriel ibn Bokhtishoʿ, and asked him to divide equally an estate which a man had seized from him. Gabriel saw that he was a righteous man, and at his request Timothy appointed him metropolitan of Jundishapur, where he remained for twenty years. He was elected after the death of Ishoʿ Bar Nun by Gabriel and Mikha'il, but was unsuitable on account of his great age, as he was nearly a hundred years old and suffered from sciatica. He was appointed in the year 210, and needed the support of two men or a stick whenever he wanted to walk. He died at the age of 104, and was buried in the monastery of Klilishoʿ. The length of his catholicate was four years.

== See also ==
- List of patriarchs of the Church of the East

== Notes ==
Church of the East titles
Preceded by Ishoʿ Bar Nun (823–828)	Catholicos-Patriarch of the East (828–831)	Succeeded by Sabrishoʿ II (831–835)
