= Timothy II of Seleucia-Ctesiphon =

Nestorian Patriarch

Mar Timothy II
- Patriarch of the Church of the East
- Church: Church of the East
- See: Seleucia-Ctesiphon
- Installed: 1318
- Term ended: c. 1332
- Predecessor: Yahballaha III
- Successor: Denha II
- Other post: Metropolitan of Erbil

Personal details
- Born: 13th century
- Died: c. 1332

Mar Timothy II (also Timotheos II) was Patriarch of the Church of the East from 1318 to c. 1332. He became leader of the church at a time of profound external stress due to loss of favor with the Mongol rulers of Persia.

Eleven bishops were present at Timothy's consecration in 1318: the metropolitans Joseph of ʿIlam, ʿAbdishoʿ of Nisibis and Shemʿon of Mosul, and the bishops Shemʿon of Beth Garmaï, ʿShemon of Tirhan, Shemʿon of Balad, Yohannan of Beth Waziq, Yohannan of Shigar, ʿAbdishoʿ of Hnitha, Isaac of Beth Daron and Ishoʿyahb of Tella and Barbelli (Marga). Timothy himself had been metropolitan of Erbil before his election as patriarch.

One of Timothy's first acts as patriarch was to call a synod in February 1318 and to affirm the Nomocanon of Abdisho of Nisibis as a source of ecclesiastical law. The canons of this synod were the last to have been recorded in the Church of the East before the nineteenth century.

Timothy wrote an important treatise on the sacraments of the Church, part of which has been translated into English.

== See also ==
- List of patriarchs of the Church of the East

== Notes ==
Church of the East titles
Preceded by Yahballaha III (1281–1317)	Catholicos-Patriarch of the East; 1318–c.1332	Succeeded by Vacant (c.1332-c.1336); Denha II (1336/7-1381/2)
