= Yaqob II =

Yaʿqob II (699–?) was Patriarch of the Church of the East from 753 to 773. He is included in the traditional list of patriarchs of the Church of the East. He spent much of his reign in prison after offending the caliph al-Mansur.

== Sources ==
Brief accounts of Yaʿqob's reign are given in the Ecclesiastical Chronicle of the Jacobite writer Bar Hebraeus (floruit 1280) and in the ecclesiastical histories of the Nestorian writers Mari (twelfth-century), ʿAmr (fourteenth-century) and Sliba (fourteenth-century).

== Yaqob's patriarchate ==
The following account of Yaʿqob's reign is given by Bar Hebraeus, who was particularly interested in the agreement made between the Nestorian and Jacobite churches under which the Nestorians built a church in the Jacobite stronghold of Tagrit in return for the restoration of the Jacobite church of Mar Domitius in Nisibis.

Then Yaʿqob was installed and consecrated at Seleucia, after the bishops received a written pledge from him that he would neither break the law nor violate the canons. In his time a church was built in Tagrit for the Nestorians on the initiative of Sliba-zkha, bishop of Tirhan. He had been imprisoned in chains along with the catholicus Yaʿqob, and when he regained his freedom began to build his churches in Tirhan, and even went to Tagrit to visit the maphrian Paul, whom he tried to persuade to allow the Nestorians to build a church in Tagrit. The maphrian replied, 'I myself have no objection, but I am afraid of the patriarch and the people of Tagrit. I therefore advise you to go to Nisibis and persuade the Nestorians to restore to the Jacobites the churches they have taken from them. Then the people of Tagrit will surely agree that a church can be built among them for your people.' And so Sliba-zkha went to Nisibis, and petitioned the aged metropolitan Cyprian and the Nestorians of Nisibis, and they restored the celebrated church of Mar Domitius to our people. Then ten of the Jacobite merchants who lived in Nisibis went to Tagrit and petitioned for a church to be built there for the Nestorians. Sliba-zkha also went to the patriarch Giwargis who was still imprisoned in Baghdad, and they both wrote to the people of Tagrit, asking them to conclude the matter. Although a number of argumentative young men objected, their elders did not follow them, but granted the Nestorians a piece of land next to the Tigris, by the outer walls of the city. There they built a small church, in which they still hold their services to this day. They began to build it in the year 150 of the Arabs [767/8].

== See also ==
- List of patriarchs of the Church of the East

== Notes ==
Church of the East titles
Preceded by Surin (753)	Catholicos-Patriarch of the East (753–773)	Succeeded by Hnanishoʿ II (773–780)
