= Sabrisho IV =

Mar Sabrisho IV
- Patriarch of the Church of the East
- Church: Church of the East
- See: Seleucia-Ctesiphon
- Installed: 1222
- Term ended: 8 June 1225
- Predecessor: Yahballaha II
- Successor: Sabrisho V

Personal details
- Born: Sabrishoʿ bar Qayyoma
- Died: 8 June 1225
- Residence: Baghdad

Sabrishoʿ IV bar Qayyoma was Patriarch of the Church of the East from 1222 until his death in 1225.

== Sources ==
Brief accounts of Sabrishoʿ's patriarchate are given in the Ecclesiastical Chronicle of the Jacobite writer Bar Hebraeus (fl. 1280) and in the ecclesiastical histories of the fourteenth-century Nestorian writers ʿAmr and Sliba.

Modern assessments of his reign can be found in Jean-Maurice Fiey's Chrétiens syriaques sous les Abbassides and David Wilmshurst's The Martyred Church.

== Sabrisho's patriarchate ==
The following account of Sabrishoʿ's patriarchate is given by Bar Hebraeus:

Yahballaha II was succeeded by Sabrishoʿ, his nephew by his brother, also as a result of the gold which he conveyed to the governor by the hand of the celebrated Amin al-Dawla Abu'lkarim, son of Thomas, namely 7,000 dinars. He died on the second Sunday of the month, on the eighth day of the sixth month of the year 622 of the Arabs (AD 1225/6), and was buried next to his uncle. He was succeeded by Sabrishoʿ bar Masihi.

== See also ==
- List of patriarchs of the Church of the East

== Notes ==
Church of the East titles
Preceded by Yahballaha II (1190–1222)	Catholicos-Patriarch of the East (1222–1225)	Succeeded by Sabrishoʿ V (1226–1256)
