= Yohannan III =

Patriarch of the Church of the East (893-899)

Yohannan III, the nephew of the patriarch Theodosius (853–858), was Patriarch of the Church of the East from 893 to 899. He was remembered as a profound scholar, but also as a glutton, a miser and a simoniac.

== Sources ==
Brief accounts of Yohannan's patriarchate are given in the Ecclesiastical Chronicle of the Jacobite writer Bar Hebraeus (floruit 1280) and in the ecclesiastical histories of the Nestorian writers Mari (twelfth-century), ʿAmr (fourteenth-century) and Sliba (fourteenth-century)

== Yohannan's patriarchate ==
The following account of Yohannan's patriarchate, partly dependent on Mari's version, is given by Bar Hebraeus:

The catholicus Yohannan Bar Narsaï was succeeded by Yohannan, the nephew of the catholicus Theodosius by his brother. This man was a bishop, and assembled with the other bishops for the election of the catholicus at Pentecost; and when they asked him to preach a sermon to the people on the Lord's day, he began to deliver the homily of Saint Gregory Theologus on the Holy Spirit, which begins 'Let us say little about this feast'. He recited it word for word, neither adding to it nor subtracting from it. This feat won him the favour of all the people. They were delighted by him, and agreed that he should be catholicus, and he was consecrated at Seleucia in the year 280 [AD 893]. Besides being an expert in church doctrine, this Yohannan was tall and handsome, but also given to gluttony. He used to indulge his stomach, and he loved money. He awarded the diocese of Mosul to Yohannan Bar Bokhtishoʿ, the bishop of Maʿaltha, expecting that he would give him a large amount of gold. But Yohannan, trusting in his cleverness and his power, went back on his word, and refused to give a single penny to the catholicus. The catholicus, despite trying several times to get some of the money owing to him, finally went away empty-handed. He died shortly afterwards, in the year 286 of the Arabs [AD 899].

== See also ==
- List of patriarchs of the Church of the East

== Notes ==
Church of the East titles
Preceded by Yohannan II (884–891)	Catholicos-Patriarch of the East (893–899)	Succeeded by Yohannan IV (900–905)
