= Yohannan II =

Yohannan II bar Narsai was Patriarch of the Church of the East from 884 to 891.

== Sources ==
Brief accounts of Yohannan's patriarchate are given in the Ecclesiastical Chronicle of the Jacobite writer Bar Hebraeus (floruit 1280) and in the ecclesiastical histories of the Nestorian writers Mari (twelfth-century), ʿAmr (fourteenth-century) and Sliba (fourteenth-century)

== Yohannan's patriarchate ==
The following anecdotes of Yohannan's patriarchate are given by Bar Hebraeus:

At the same time the catholicus Enosh, having fulfilled his office, died at the beginning of hziran [June] in the year 270 of the Arabs [AD 883]. He was succeeded by Yohannan bar Narsaï of Beth Garmaï. Since the votes of the bishops fell both on him and on another monk, a man named Shubhalishoʿ, their names were written on sherds of pottery and placed below the altar. After they had fasted and prayed, the name of Yohannan bar Narsaï was drawn, and he was consecrated at Seleucia in the year 271 of the Arabs [AD 884]. Seven months after his consecration the accursed Arabs pillaged the monastery of Klilishoʿ, and after burning and destroying its roof they broke open the burial place of the catholicus Enosh in the patriarchal cell, cut off his head, stuck it on the point of a lance and paraded it around the streets. The cause of all this evil was the avarice of the patriarch. He had been accustomed to give something from the cell to an old Arab man who made the call to prayer in one of the mosques close to the patriarchal cell. After Bar Narsaï was appointed, he came as usual to ask for his tip, but the patriarch said, 'Do not continue to indulge him in this thing, lest he becomes grasping and gives us no peace.' And when they sent this man back empty-handed, he took counsel with some of his fellows, and on a certain day, when the Arabs were taking the body of a dead man to a cemetery, one of the cronies of this old man hid himself and threw a stone onto the bier of the dead man. The Arabs were enraged by this, and demanded to know who threw the stone. Some other men joined them, and said that they had seen the stone being thrown from the monastery. They then went away and buried the dead man, but later came back and did those dreadful deeds in the monastery and the cell.

In the time of the catholicus Yohannan bar Narsaï the wazir Isma'il stole some villages that belonged to the patriarchal throne, and the catholicus went to see the caliph to obtain an edict from him ordering the wazir to restore them. When the catholicus came to the wazir, the wazir asked him about his faith, and the catholicus replied, 'Spare me this kind of question, as I have not made a study of disputation.' The wazir rebuked him, saying, 'Why was a man like yourself, of little talent, placed in authority over more able men?' The catholicus replied, 'I told them that I was not worthy, but they refused to listen to me.' The wazir continued to press him, urging him to tell him as best he could how he profited from Christ; and he was finally forced to say, 'I say the same as Paul: Christ is a mediator between God and men.' The catholicus Yohannan died in the year 279 of the Arabs [AD 890/1], after fulfilling his office for eight years.

== See also ==
- List of patriarchs of the Church of the East

== Notes ==
Church of the East titles
Preceded by Enosh (877–884)	Catholicos-Patriarch of the East (884–891)	Succeeded by Yohannan III (893–899)
