= Sargis of Seleucia-Ctesiphon =

Sargis was Patriarch of the Church of the East between 860 and 872.

== Sources ==
Brief accounts of Sargis's patriarchate are given in the Ecclesiastical Chronicle of the Jacobite writer Bar Hebraeus (floruit 1280) and in the ecclesiastical histories of the Nestorian writers Mari (twelfth-century), ʿAmr (fourteenth-century) and Sliba (fourteenth-century).

== Sargis's patriarchate ==
The following account of Sargis's patriarchate is given by Mari:

Sargis. We have mentioned earlier how this man assisted when al-Mutawakkil passed through Damascus and established an excellent relationship with him. After the death of Theodosius the caliph ordered that he should be appointed patriarch, but was warned that the metropolitans of Nisibis were not allowed to become patriarch because Bar Sawma had contrived the murder of Babowai and Yohannan the Leper had tried to murder Mar Hnanishoʿ. The caliph ignored this custom, and Sargis was consecrated in al-Madaïn on the Sunday after the fast of the apostles, on the twenty-first day of tammuz [July] in the year 1171 of the era of Alexander [AD 860]. His reign, and the peace and security that accompanied it, was a cause of joy to the faithful. Instead of going to Dorqoni he went to Baghdad, where he was received with great honour, and from there went on to Samarra, where he could deal with matters needing his attention. As a result the condition of the church improved in his reign. He died on the second Sunday after the feast of the holy cross, in the third year of the caliphate of al-Muʿtamid. The Christians did not dare to bury him in the monastery of Yazdapneh, because of what had happened to Abraham, and his body was instead buried in the monastery of Klilishoʿ in Baghdad. He reigned for twelve years, two months and one day.

== See also ==
- List of patriarchs of the Church of the East

== Notes ==
Church of the East titles
Preceded by Theodosius (853–858)	Catholicos-Patriarch of the East; 860–872	Succeeded by Vacant (872–877); Enosh (877–884)
