= Abraham II of Seleucia-Ctesiphon =

Abraham II was Patriarch of the Church of the East from 837 to 850. He was a monk at Beth Abe and was later appointed a bishop of Hdatta before being elected to the patriarchate. Brief accounts of Abraham's patriarchate are given in the Ecclesiastical Chronicle of the Jacobite writer Bar Hebraeus (floruit 1280) and in the ecclesiastical histories of the Nestorian writers Mari (twelfth-century), ʿAmr (fourteenth-century) and Sliba (fourteenth-century). The following account of Abraham's patriarchate is given by Bar Hebraeus:

Sabrishoʿ II was succeeded by Abraham II, from the monastery of Beth ʿAbe, who was a man pure and chaste in body but not learned, and not up to the task of governing the church. His nephew Ephrem, his sister's son, and another son by a concubine used their power perversely. During his time the Christians were in sore straits, as the Arabs demolished several churches in Basra.

== Notes ==
Church of the East titles
Preceded by Sabrishoʿ II (831–835)	Catholicos-Patriarch of the East (837–850)	Succeeded by Theodosius (853–858)
