= Pethion =

Patriarch of the Church of the East

Pethion was Patriarch of the Church of the East from 731 to 740.

== Sources ==
Brief accounts of Pethion's patriarchate are given in the Ecclesiastical Chronicle of the Jacobite writer Bar Hebraeus (floruit 1280) and in the ecclesiastical histories of the Nestorian writers Mari (twelfth-century), ʿAmr (fourteenth-century) and Sliba (fourteenth-century).

== Pethion's patriarchate ==
The following account of Pethion's patriarchate is given by Bar Hebraeus:

Sliba-zkha was succeeded by Pethion, bishop of Tirhan, a native of Beth Garmaï. He was consecrated at Seleucia while he was still a young man. He was diligent in the performance of his duties and looked after a school he had founded. He gave the students extra rations and a set of new clothes every year, and also gave them presents once a week and on feast days. They say that his school eventually attracted as many as 400 students. He was respected equally by his bishops and his people on account of his chastity. After fulfilling his office for eleven years, he died in the year 123 of the Arabs [AD 740/1] and was succeeded by Aba Bar Brikh Sebyaneh from Kashkar.

== See also ==
- List of patriarchs of the Church of the East

== Notes ==
Church of the East titles
Preceded by Sliba-zkha (714–728)	Catholicos-Patriarch of the East (731–740)	Succeeded by Aba II (741–751)
