= Book of the Bee =

13th-century Syriac Christian text

The Book of the Bee (Syriac: ܟܬܒܐ ܕܕܒܘܪܝܬܐ, romanized: Kṯāḇā ḏ-debboriṯā) is a historiographic and theological compilation, containing numerous biblical stories. It was written around 1222, by Solomon of Akhlat, who was Bishop of Basra, within the Church of the East. It is written in the Syriac language.

The book is a collection of theological and historical texts and consists of 55 chapters discussing various topics including the creation, heaven and earth, the angels, darkness, paradise, Old Testament patriarchs, New Testament events, lists of kings and patriarchs, and the final day of resurrection. The book was very popular among local Christian communities, and it was transmitted up to the 19th century.

The author, Solomon of Akhlat, was a bishop of the Church of the East during the first half of the 13th century. He was a diocesan bishop of Basra, now in Iraq, and was present at the consecration of the Patriarch of the Church of the East, Sabrisho IV, in 1222. He dedicated the book to his friend, bishop Narsai of Beth Waziq.

The book was written in Syriac, a literary form of Eastern Middle Aramaic, and it was also translated into Arabic. The author held his native Syriac language in high regard and adopted the notion of some older authors that it was the oldest language.

The book was translated into Latin and published in 1866, by Joseph Schönfelder (d. 1913). In 1886, Syriac text was published with English translation, by British orientalist Ernest A. Wallis Budge (d. 1934).

== See also ==
- Syriac literature
- Syriac Christianity

== Sources ==
- Baumstark, Anton (1922). Geschichte der syrischen Literatur, mit Ausschluss der christlich-palästinensischen Texte. Bonn: A. Marcus und E. Weber Verlag. ISBN 9783110821253.
- Brock, Sebastian P. (1989). "Three Thousand Years of Aramaic Literature". ARAM Periodical. 1 (1): 11–23.
- Budge, Ernest A. Wallis, ed. (1886). The Book of the Bee: The Syriac Text Edited from the Manuscripts in London, Oxford, and Munich with an English Translation. Oxford: Clarendon Press.
- Fiey, Jean Maurice (1993). Pour un Oriens Christianus Novus: Répertoire des diocèses syriaques orientaux et occidentaux. Beirut: Orient-Institut. ISBN 9783515057189.
- Loopstra, Jonathan A. (2011). "Shlemon of Baṣra". Gorgias Encyclopedic Dictionary of the Syriac Heritage. Piscataway, NJ: Gorgias Press. p. 378.
- Schönfelder, Joseph M., ed. (1866). Salomonis episcopi Bassorensis liber Apis: Syriacum Arabicumque textum Latine vertit notis illustravit. Bamberg: Reindl.
- Teule, Herman G. B. (2012). "Solomon of Basra". Christian-Muslim Relations: A Bibliographical History. Vol. 4. Leiden-Boston: Brill. pp. 193–195. ISBN 978-9004228542.
- Weltecke, Dorothea; Younansardaroud, Helen (2019). "The Renaissance of Syriac Literature in the Twelfth–Thirteenth Centuries". The Syriac World. London: Routledge. pp. 698–717. ISBN 9781138899018.
- Wright, William (1894). A Short History of Syriac Literature. London: Adam and Charles Black.
