= Makkikha II =

Patriarch of the Church of the East (died 1265)

Mar Makkikha II
- Patriarch of the Church of the East
- Church: Church of the East
- See: Seleucia-Ctesiphon
- Installed: 1257
- Term ended: 1265
- Predecessor: Sabrisho V
- Successor: Denha I
- Other post: Metropolitan of Nisibis

Personal details
- Born: 13th century
- Died: 1265
- Residence: Caliphal Palace, Baghdad

Makkikha II (also written Makika II) was Patriarch of the Church of the East from 1257 until his death in 1265. He succeeded the patriarch Sabrisho V ibn al-Masihi and was followed by Denha I.

== Sources ==
Brief accounts of Makkika's patriarchate are given in the Ecclesiastical Chronicle of the Jacobite writer Bar Hebraeus (fl. 1280) and in the ecclesiastical histories of the fourteenth-century Nestorian writers ʿAmr and Sliba.

== Makkikha's election ==
Makkikha won the patriarchal election of 1257 by slandering his chief rival, the metropolitan and future patriarch Denha of Erbil, as a friend of the Mongol khans who was too dangerous to elect as patriarch. Bribery was commonplace in the patriarchal elections of the Church of the East at this period. The following account of Makkikha's election is given by Bar Hebraeus:

In the same year in which the Nestorian catholicus Sabrishoʿ Bar Masihi died, namely the year 654 of the Arabs [AD 1256/7], the bishops gathered together at Baghdad, and a quarrel arose between the men of Baghdad and the bishops over the election of the catholicus. Some men preferred Eliya, metropolitan of ʿIlam, others Makkikha, metropolitan of Nisibis, and others still Denha, metropolitan of Erbil. After wrangling amongst themselves for six months, they began to outbid one another in offering bribes to the caliph, so that the sum of money promised rose as high as 45,000 gold dinars. They were then told that the man who first raised this sum and handed it over would be made patriarch. Mar Denha of Erbil raised this sum and handed over 4,000 gold dinars as a down payment, but his enemies slandered him, saying, 'He is a friend of the Tartar kings, and any money you accept from him now he will soon take back from you twofold.' The caliph's advisers believed this slander, and the three metropolitans were accordingly summoned to the caliph's palace, where an edict was read out conferring the leadership on the elderly metropolitan of Nisibis instead of his younger colleague of Erbil. Then the firman was given to Makkikha and the mitre was placed on his head, and they made him ride around on a mule, accompanied by two noblemen who held the firman above his head. And so he went down to the church of the third ward, and the fathers accompanied him to Seleucia and consecrated him on the fifth Sunday of Lent. They gave Mar Denha back his gold, and the arrival of the Tartars in Baghdad not long afterwards freed the catholicus Makkikha from having to pay back the money he himself had borrowed.

== Makkikha's patriarchate ==
Makkikha is well known for his friendly relations with the Mongol Ilkhanate and his involvement in the Siege of Baghdad, where all Christians were spared at the intervention of the Mongol Hulagu's Nestorian Christian wife Dokuz Khatun. The year following the fall of Baghdad, the Mongol ruler Hulagu offered the royal palace to Makkikha, and ordered a cathedral to be built for him; for the next decade the palace became the patriarchal residence.

== See also ==
- List of patriarchs of the Church of the East

== Notes ==
Church of the East titles
Preceded by Sabrishoʿ V (1226–1256)	Catholicos-Patriarch of the East (1257–1265)	Succeeded by Denha I (1265–1281)
