= Isho bar Nun =

Patriarch of the Church of the East

Ishoʿ bar Nun was Patriarch of the Church of the East from 823 to 828. He succeeded Timothy I, widely considered to be the most impressive of the Nestorian patriarchs.

== Sources ==
Brief accounts of Ishoʿ bar Nun's patriarchate are given in the Ecclesiastical Chronicle of the Jacobite writer Bar Hebraeus (floruit 1280) and in the ecclesiastical histories of the Nestorian writers Mari (twelfth-century), ʿAmr (fourteenth-century) and Sliba (fourteenth-century). Modern assessments of Ishoʿ bar Nun's reign can be found in Jean-Maurice Fiey's Chrétiens syriaques sous les Abbassides and David Wilmshurst's The Martyred Church.

== Ishoʿ bar Nun's patriarchate ==
The following account of Ishoʿ bar Nun's patriarchate is given by Bar Hebraeus:

Timothy was succeeded by Ishoʿ bar Nun of Beth Gabbare, a village in the region of Nineveh. He had resided for thirty-eight years in the monastery of Deir Saʿid near Mosul, and was very well versed in doctrine. He wrote a confutation of the writings of the catholicus Timothy and criticised everything he did, calling him Tolemathy, that is, injurious to God. After the death of Timothy, Gabriel bar Bokhtishoʿ and Mikha'il, the physicians of the caliph al-Ma'mun, supported this Ishoʿ bar Nun, and the bishops followed their lead and consecrated him at Seleucia in the year 205 of the Arabs [AD 820]. They say that when Timothy was dying he was asked who would be a suitable man to succeed him, and he replied that Ishoʿ bar Nun would be suitable. 'Although he has attacked and opposed me throughout my reign, I cannot now do other than answer your question truthfully.'

== Literary achievement ==
Ishoʿ bar Nun was widely respected as a theologian and a canonist, and was a prolific author in a number of genres. His Select Questions, a work of biblical exegesis, has survived, but most of his other works (including the books in which he attacked Timothy I, which were destroyed on his instructions) have been lost.

== See also ==
- List of patriarchs of the Church of the East

== Notes ==
Church of the East titles
Preceded by Timothy I (780–823)	Catholicos-Patriarch of the East (823–828)	Succeeded by Giwargis II (828–831)
