= Kashkar =

Ancient city in southern Mesopotamia

Kashkar, also known as Kaskar, (Classical Syriac: ܟܫܟܪ), was a city in southern Mesopotamia. Its name appears to originate from Syriac ܟܪܟܐ karḵa meaning "citadel" or "town". Other sources connect it to ܟܫܟܪܘܬܐ kaškarūṯá "farming". It was originally built on the Tigris, across the river from the later medieval city of Wasit.

The city was originally a significant Sasanian city built on the west bank of the Tigris where Greek speaking deportees from north-western Syria were settled by Shapur I in the mid third century A.D.

According to Syriac tradition, Mar Mari is said to have preached and performed miracles and converted many of its inhabitants to Christianity. Kashkar became an important centre of Christianity in lower Mesopotamia and had its own diocese which lay under the jurisdiction of the Patriarchal Province of Seleucia-Ctesiphon.

During a flood the Tigris burst its banks leaving Kashkar on its east bank. The medieval city of Wasit was built on the west bank of the new channel by al-Hajjaj ibn Yusuf, who drew off the population of Kashkar, which eventually turned it to a ghost town. By the middle of the twelfth century Kashkar ceased to exist as a bishopric see.

== See also ==
- Kashkar (East Syrian Diocese)
- Abraham the Great of Kashkar
