= Aba II =

Patriarch of the Church of the East from 741 to 751

Aba II (641–751) was Patriarch of the Church of the East from 741 to 751. He is included in the traditional list of patriarchs of the Church of the East.

== Sources ==
Brief accounts of Aba's reign are given in the Ecclesiastical Chronicle of the Jacobite writer Bar Hebraeus (floruit 1280) and in the ecclesiastical histories of the Nestorian writers Mari (twelfth-century), ʿAmr (fourteenth-century) and Sliba (fourteenth-century).

== Aba's patriarchate ==
Aba was a student under Gabriel Arya at the School of Seleucia-Ctesiphon. As patriarch, he got into a dispute with his clergy over the running of the school.

The following account of Aba's reign is given by Bar Hebraeus:

After fulfilling his office for eleven years, he (Pethion) died in the year 123 of the Arabs [AD 740/1] and was succeeded by Aba Bar Brikh Sebyaneh from Kashkar. This man was well read in church literature and dialectic, wrote a commentary on Gregory Theologus, and devoted all his time to the reading of books. Meanwhile the clerics seized the revenues from his school and removed it from the authority of the catholicus. He took this badly, left Seleucia, and went instead to live in a monastery near Kashkar. Then the clerics suppressed his proclamation by removing his name from the diptychs, but after he wrote them soothing letters and returned to them they welcomed him back. During his time, in the year 129 of the Arabs [AD 746], the caliphate of the Arabs came to an end in Palestine and the caliphate of the ʿAbbasids began in the East. The ʿAbbasids were fonder of the Christians than the Damascenes had been. The catholicus Aba, after fulfilling his office for ten years, died at the age of over a hundred and was buried in Seleucia.

== See also ==
- List of patriarchs of the Church of the East

== Bibliography ==
- Chabot, Jean-Baptiste (ed.). La lettre du Catholicos Mar-Aba II: aux membres de l'École patriarcale de Séleucie (in French). Paris. p. 41. OCLC 13949396.

Church of the East titles
Preceded by Pethion (731–740)	Catholicos-Patriarch of the East (741–751)	Succeeded by Surin (753)
