= Timothy I of Seleucia-Ctesiphon =

Patriarch of the Church of the East from 780 to 823

Timothy I (c. 740 – 9 January 823) was the Patriarch of the Church of the East from 780 to 823 and one of its most influential patriarchs. He was also an author, church leader, diplomat, and administrator. During his reign he reformed the metropolitan administration of the Church of the East, granting greater independence to the metropolitan bishops of the mission field (the 'exterior' provinces) but excluding them from participation in patriarchal elections. These reforms laid the foundations for the later success of Church of the East missions in Central Asia.

== Early life and succession to the patriarchate ==
Timothy was a native of Ḥazza in Adiabene, part of the wider region of Assyria (Athor). As a young man, he studied under Abraham Bar Dashandad at the school of Bashishoʿ in Sapsapa, in the ʿAqra district. He later became bishop of the diocese of Beth Bgash, in the metropolitan province of Adiabene, winning the respect of Abu Musa ibn Musʿab, the Moslem governor of Mosul, and his Christian secretary Abu Nuh al-Anbari. On the death of the patriarch Hnanishoʿ II in 778, Timothy used a judicious mixture of bribery, deceit and (probably) murder to secure his own election as patriarch. One rival for the post was the elderly Ishoʿyahb, the superior of the monastery of Beth ʿAbe, and Timothy first frightened him by advising him that he might not be fit enough to survive the intrigues of high office, but honored him by offering him the position of metropolitan of Adiabene. A second potential rival, Giwargis, was nominated at a synod convened by the bishop Thomas of Kashkar in the monastery of Mar Pethion in Baghdad. Giwargis enjoyed the support of the caliph al-Mahdi's Christian doctor ʿIsa ibn Quraysh, and might have been a serious threat to Timothy had he not died suddenly in suspicious circumstances. Timothy then secured a majority in the subsequent ballot by promising to reward his supporters handsomely. After he was elected, he did nothing of the sort. Those who complained were told, 'The priesthood is not sold for money.'

These tactics were not forgotten by his opponents, and an opposition party led by the metropolitan Joseph of Merv held a synod in the monastery of Beth Hale, in which they excommunicated Timothy and replaced Ishoʿyahb as metropolitan of Adiabene by Rustam, bishop of Hnitha. Timothy retorted with the same weapon and deposed Joseph of Merv, who, failing to find redress from the caliph al-Mahdi, converted to Islam. Further rounds of excommunications led to rioting in the streets of Baghdad by the city's Christians. The opposition to Timothy was finally stilled by the intervention of ʿIsa ibn Quraysh.

== Literary achievement ==
Timothy was a respected writer of scientific, theological, liturgical, and canonical books. Some 59 of his letters survive, covering roughly the first half of his patriarchate. The letters discuss varied biblical and theological questions as well as revealing much about the situation of the church in his day. One letter records him ordaining bishops for the Turks of Central Asia, for Tibet, for Shiharzur, Radan, Ray, Iran, Gurgan, Balad, and several other places. The letters also show a wide familiarity with literature from across the ancient Christian world. Because he moved to Baghdad after his election as patriarch, he was familiar with the Abbasid court and assisted in the translation of works by Aristotle and others.

One of Timothy's most famous literary productions is the Apology of Timothy the Patriarch before the Caliph Mahdi, the record of an inconclusive debate on the rival claims of Christianity and Islam, held in 782 with the third Abbasid caliph Al-Mahdi (reigned 775–85). The debate offers a somewhat unorganized back-and-forth that lends credence to the argument that the debate took place and was recorded by Timothy himself. It was published first in Syriac and later in Arabic. In its surviving form, in Syriac, it is noticeably respectful towards Islam, and may well have been written for the enjoyment of both Christian and Muslim readers. The debate was translated into English in 1928 by Alphonse Mingana, under the title 'Timothy's Apology for Christianity'. Its theme is of perennial interest, and it can still be read today both for pleasure and profit.

Timothy's legal work is twofold. He probably compiled the Synodicon Orientale (a collection of the synods of the Church of the East) between 775 and 790. He also wrote a lawbook entitled "Ṭaksē d-dēne ʿtānāye wad-yārtāwaṯā" (ܛܟܣܹ̈ܐ ܕܕܝ̈ܢܹܐ ܥܹܕܬܵܢܝܹܐ ܘܕܝܪ̈ܬܿܘܵܬܵܐ) ("Orders of Ecclesiastical Judgments and Inheritances"). The lawbook of Timothy is structured as follows: introductory prologue, 99 judicial decisions and an epilogue. The lawbook's prologue presents a legal theory justifying the use and application of Christian courts and judges within the Christian dhimmi of the Abbasid empire. The topics addressed by the lawbook include ecclesiastical order and hierarchy, marriage and divorce, inheritance and dowries, and slavery and property law. He is only secondarily interested in the organization of ecclesiastical courts and in procedural law.

== Interest in missionary expansion ==
Timothy took a particularly keen interest in the missionary expansion of the Church of the East. He is known to have consecrated metropolitans for Damascus, for Armenia, for Dailam and Gilan, for Rai in Tabaristan, for Sarbaz in Segestan, for the Turks of Central Asia, and for China, and he also declared his intention of consecrating a metropolitan for Tibet. Mar Shubhalishoʿ, metropolitan of Dailam and Gilan was martyred. He also detached India from the metropolitan province of Fars and made it a separate metropolitan province.

== Resting place ==
Timothy was buried in Baghdad's Dayr al-Jathaliq ("Catholicos Monastery"), originally Dayrā Klilā Ishuʿ (Syriac: ܕܝܪܐ ܟܠܝܠܐ ܝܫܘܥ "Wreath of Yeshua/Jesus monastery"), which was a monastery of the Church of the East built on the western bank of the Tigris in the Sasanian Empire's province of Mesopotamia, Asōristān.

== Notes ==
Church of the East titles
Preceded by Hnanishoʿ II (773–780)	Catholicos-Patriarch of the East (780–823)	Succeeded by Ishoʿ Bar Nun (823–828)
