= Margiana =

Historical region in modern Turkmenistan

Coordinates: 37°36′N 61°50′E

Margiana Marv
- Province of the Seleucid Empire, Parthian Empire and Sasanian Empire
- c. 281–261 BC–651 AD
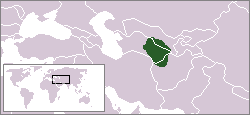
- Margiana, ca. 300 BC
- Capital: Merv
- Historical era: Antiquity
  - Established: c. 281–261 BC
  - Annexed by the Rashidun Caliphate: 651 AD
- Today part of: Afghanistan; Turkmenistan; Uzbekistan

Margiana (Greek: Μαργιανή Margianḗ, Old Persian: Marguš, Middle Persian: Marv) is a historical region centred on the oasis of Merv and was a minor satrapy within the Achaemenid satrapy of Bactria, and a province within its successors, the Seleucid, Parthian and Sasanian empires.

It was located in the valley of the Murghab River which has its sources in the mountains of Afghanistan, and passes through Murghab District in modern Afghanistan, and then reaches the oasis of Merv in modern Turkmenistan. Margiana bordered Parthia to the south-west, Aria in the south, Bactria in the east and Sogdia in the north.

== History ==
=== Ancient period ===
Historians currently disagree as to the exact history of Margiana prior to the Achaemenid conquest. It is considered part of a Bronze Age civilisation, the Bactria–Margiana Archaeological Complex (short BMAC), also known as the Oxus civilisation. Some historians have argued that a kingdom was established and an urban society had begun to develop surrounding the oasis. It has also been postulated the region existed as part of a major Iranian state centred in Chorasmia that controlled Aria, Sogdia, Parthia and Margiana. Other historians have noted that whilst advanced irrigation had begun in the 7th century BC, the existence of such a state is unlikely. It has been also suggested that Margiana was part of the satrapy of Bactria under the Median Empire.

=== Achaemenid period ===
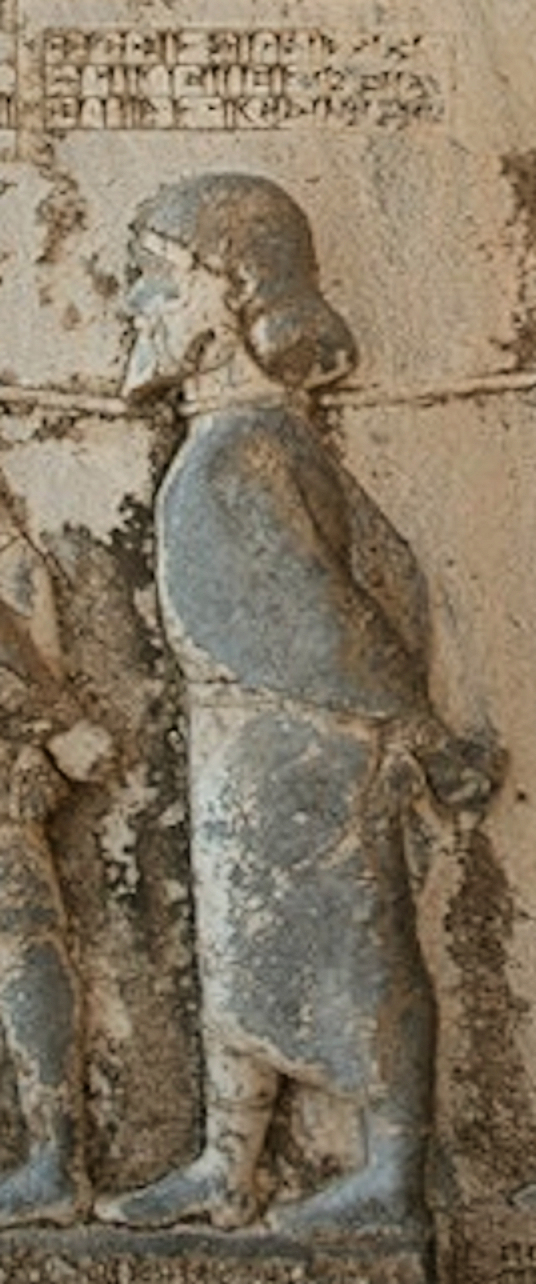
Behistun relief of Frâda, a king of Margiana circa 522 BC. Label: "This is Frâda. He lied, saying "I am king of Margiana.""

Margiana was conquered by the Persian king Cyrus the Great between 545 and 539 BC and remained as part of the satrapy of Bactria. Cyrus also founded the city of Merv. After Darius the Great's victory over the Magian usurper, Gaumata, in September 522 BC, revolts spread throughout the empire. The revolt in Margiana, led by a certain Frâda (Phraates), was suppressed almost immediately, in December 521 BC by Dadarsi, the Satrap of Bactria. In the Aramaic version of the Behistun Inscription, it is claimed that 55,423 Margians were killed and 6,972 taken captive in the aftermath of the revolt. Margiana was separated from the satrapy of Bactria and joined to the satrapy of Aria at some point after the rule of Darius the Great.

Following the Battle of Gaugamela in 331 BC, in which Alexander the Great defeated Darius III, Darius III began his retreat to Bactria, but was overthrown by the Satrap of Bactria, Bessus, who continued the retreat eastward through Aria and Margiana. Bessus, who had expected an attack from Alexander along the Silk Road, was surprised when Alexander had advanced through Gedrosia and Arachosia and crossed the Hindu Kush mountains in 329 BC to invade Bactria. Bessus fled north to Sogdia where he too was betrayed and was handed over to Alexander by his courtiers, Spitamenes and Datames.

In July 329 BC, as Alexander founded the city of Alexandria Eschate on the northern border of Sogdia, Spitamenes led a revolt and besieged the Sogdian capital of Maracanda. A Scythian incursion into Sogdia prevented Alexander from responding personally, however, once he had defeated the Scythians in the Battle of Jaxartes, he marched south to relieve Maracanda causing Spitamenes to move south and attack Balkh in the winter of 329 BC. In the spring of 328 BC, Alexander sent his general Craterus to fortify Margiana, where he established a garrison in Merv and re-founded the city as Alexandria in Margiana. Alexander's general Coenus defeated Spitamenes in the Battle of Gabai in December 328 BC, and subsequently in the following year Sogdia was merged with Bactria to form a single satrapy under the rule of Philip.

=== Hellenistic Period ===
Upon Alexander's death in 323 BC, the empire was partitioned between his generals at the Partition of Babylon and according to some historians, Philip remained as satrap of Bactria, however, it has also been suggested that he was in fact only satrap of Sogdia. Disagreements between the generals led to another meeting and in the Partition of Triparadisus in 321 BC, Philip was replaced as satrap of Bactria and Sogdia by Stasanor. During the Wars of the Diadochi, Stasanor remained neutral, however after the Babylonian War of 311–309 BC, Margiana came under the control of Seleucus I Nicator. In c. 280 BC, Margiana was devastated by the nomadic Parni tribes and several cities were destroyed. Seleucus responded by sending his general Demodamas to repel the nomads. Under Seleucus' successor, Antiochus I Soter, the oasis of Alexandria in Margiana was surrounded by a wall over 300 km long and the city was re-built and re-founded as Antiochia in Margiana as the capital of a separate satrapy of Margiana in an effort to secure communications and trade routes from Antiochus' capital in Mesopotamia to the far east. Margiana was successfully defended by Diodotus, the satrap of Bactria, against an invasion by the Parni in c. 239/238 BC. The invasion demonstrated that Seleucus II Callinicus was unable to respond to threats in the East and therefore Diodotus, who had begun pushing for his independence in c. 245 BC, abandoned hopes of remaining part of the Seleucid Empire and declared himself king, thus establishing what is now known as the Greco-Bactrian Kingdom.

Margiana was conquered by the Parthians under Mithridates I of Parthia in c. 170 BC. The defeat of the Yuezhi people in 175 BC caused many Yuezhi to flee westwards, displacing the Saka as a result, leading to a mass movement of Saka and Yuezhi towards Sogdia and Bactria. Around 140 BC the Saka invaded Parthian territory through Margiana, venturing as far as Media in central Iran and continuing to harass the Parthians until 124 BC, in the course of which they defeated and killed two successive Parthian kings. The Yuezhi, who had settled in Sogdia along the Oxus, controlled Margiana until 115 BC when Mithridates II of Parthia re-established control over the east, forcing the Yuezhi to move south into Bactria. In 53 BC, 10,000 Roman prisoners captured by the Parthians after the Battle of Carrhae in Upper Mesopotamia were settled in Antiochia in Margiana. The Yuezhi went on to conquer the remaining Greek territories in Paropamisadae and establish the Kushan Empire.

=== Post-Hellenistic period ===
The Kushans returned to Margiana in the 1st century AD and helped the satrap Sanabares declare himself king who ruled from ca. 50 AD to 65 AD. At the onset of the 3rd century AD, Margiana had been restored as a vassal of the Parthian Empire, but continued to exist as a "virtually independent state". After Ardashir I's victory over the last Parthian king, Artabanus V, at the Battle of Hormozdgān in 224 AD, Margiana, ruled by a certain king Ardashir, submitted to Ardashir I and accepted vassalage. The vassal kingdom was permitted to continue minting its own coinage until it was formally annexed by Shapur I in c. 260 AD who granted control of Margiana to his son, Narseh, as part of the province of Hind, Sagistan and Turan. In the fifth century, during the reign of the Sasanian king Bahram V, Margiana and the northern territories were invaded and plundered by the Hephthalites, also known as the White Huns. Bahram, after initially sending an offer of peace, led a surprise attack on the Hepthalites and massacred them whilst they camped and then pursued them as they attempted to flee back to their own territory. Bahram himself pursued the Hepthalites to the river Oxus in Margiana and sent one of his generals beyond the river who crippled them greatly. Despite this, the Hepthalites returned in around 480 AD and occupied Margiana until 565 AD.

In 642 AD, after the Sasanian disaster at the hands of the Rashidun Caliphate at the Battle of Nihawand, much like Darius III, the last Sasanian king, Yazdegerd III, fled eastward and arrived in Margiana in 651 AD. Yazdegerd was well received by Mahoe Suri, the marzban of Merv, however, upon arrival Yazdegerd appointed his courtier Farrukhzad as marzban and ordered that Mahoe give absolute control of the city over to him. Mahoe refused and Farrukhzad advised the king to retreat to Tabaristan, which he ignored. Farrukhzad then left for Tabaristan, where he would later become king himself. As the Muslim army approached, Mahoe plotted with the Hepthalite ruler Nezak Tarkan to overthrow Yazdegerd who later discovered the plot and retreated to Marwir-Rawdh in southern Margiana. Mahoe agreed to pay tribute to the Rashidun general Ahnaf ibn Qais who began to consolidate Islam in Margiana and awaited reinforcements.

Ahnaf captured Merw i-Rud, forcing Yazdegerd to flee to Balkh with his remaining supporters. Ahnaf was ordered by the Caliph Umar ibn al-Khattab to remain at Merv and not pursue Yazdegerd. However, upon learning that Yazdegerd had formed an alliance with Hepthalites beyond Margiana and was approaching Merv, Ahnaf rallied his forces and defeated Yazdegerd at the Battle of Oxus River. After his defeat, the Sasanian king attempted to hide in a mill where he was killed by a Margian miller, bringing the Sasanian Empire to an end.

== Religion ==
Margiana's position along the Silk Road led to the development of a diverse religious demography in the period prior to the Islamic Conquest. Although most of the population in Margiana practised Zoroastrianism, Buddhist, Christian, Manichaean and Jewish communities also existed and thrived in Margiana. Buddhist monasteries are known to have existed in Margiana, and the city of Merv acted as a major centre of Buddhist learning. A Manichaean community is known to have existed from the mid 3rd century AD.

According to Al-Biruni, Christianity had spread to Margiana within 200 years of the birth of Christ. In the 3rd century AD, at least one Christian monastery was founded and a reference to a diocese based in Merv is first mentioned in 334. A Nestorian diocese, based in the city of Merv, is known to have existed from 424 AD, and it later became a metropolitan province in 554. The uncommon name of the first recorded bishop of Merv, Bar Shaba, which means "son of the deportation", would suggest that the Christian community in Margiana may have been deported from Roman territory. A diocese of Merw i-Rud in southern Margiana also existed in 554.

== See also ==
- Bactria–Margiana Archaeological Complex
- History of Turkmenistan

== Sources ==
- Asheri, David; Lloyd, Alan; Corcella, Aldo (2007). A Commentary on Herodotus, Books 1–4.
- Bopearachchi, Osmund (1995). "DIODOTUS". Encyclopaedia Iranica.
- Brunner, Christopher (1983). "Geographical and Administrative divisions: Settlements and Economy". The Cambridge History of Iran: The Seleucid, Parthian, and Sasanian periods (2). Cambridge University Press. ISBN 9780521200936.
- Chabot, Jean-Baptiste (1902). Synodicon orientale ou recueil de synodes nestoriens (PDF). Paris: Imprimerie Nationale.
- Chiesa, F. (1982). Osservazione sulla monetazione Indo-Partica. Sanabares I e Sanabares II incertezze ed ipotesie.
- Dani, Ahmad Hasan (1999). History of Civilizations of Central Asia: The development of sedentary and nomadic civilizations: 700 B.C. to A.D. 250. Motilal Banarsidass Publ. ISBN 9788120814080.
- Farrokh, Kaveh; Frye, Richard N. (2007). Shadows in the Desert: Ancient Persia at War.
- Foltz, Richard (1999). Religions of the Silk Road: Overland Trade and Cultural Exchange from Antiquity to the Fifteenth Century.
- Fowlkes-Childs, Blair (2003). "The Sasanian Empire (224–651 A.D.)". Heilbrunn Timeline of Art History.
- Frye, Richard N. (1983). The History of Ancient Iran.
- Herzfeld, Ernst (1968). The Persian Empire: Studies in Geography and Ethnography of the Ancient Near East.
- Lendering, Jona (1998). "Artaxerxes V Bessus". Livius.
- Lendering, Jona (2000). "Spitamenes". Livius.
- Lendering, Jona (2006). "Alexandria in Margiana". Livius.
- Lendering, Jona (2011). "Margiana". Livius.
- Lerner, Jeffrey D. (1999). The Impact of Seleucid Decline on the Eastern Iranian Plateau: The Foundations of Arsacid Parthia and Graeco-Bactria. Franz Steiner Verlag. ISBN 9783515074179.
- Lukonin, V. G. (1983). "Political, Social and Administrative Institutions: Settlements and Economy". The Cambridge History of Iran: The Seleucid, Parthian, and Sasanian periods (2). Cambridge University Press. ISBN 9780521200936.
- Pourshariati, Parvaneh (2008). Decline and Fall of the Sasanian Empire: The Sasanian-Parthian Confederacy and the Arab Conquest of Iran.
- Rawlinson, George (1867). The Seven Great Monarchies Of The Ancient Eastern World, Vol 5: Persia.
- Rawlinson, George (1873). The Seven Great Monarchies Of The Ancient Eastern World, Vol 6: Parthia.
- Rawlinson, George (1875). The Seven Great Monarchies Of The Ancient Eastern World, Vol 7: The Sassanian or New Persian Empire.
- Strabo (1924). H. L. Jones (ed.). Geography.
- Wilcox, Peter (1986). Rome's Enemies (3): Parthians & Sassanid Persians. Bloomsbury USA. ISBN 9780850456882.
- Williams, Tim (2012). "Unmanned Aerial Vehicle Photography: Exploring the Medieval City of Merv, on the Silk Roads of Central Asia" (PDF). Archaeology International. 15 (15). doi:10.5334/ai.1522.
- Young, T.C. Jr. (1988). "The consolidation of the empire and its limits of growth under Darius and Xerxes". The Cambridge Ancient History.
