= Sergius of Samarkand =

Church of the East saint

Mār Sargīs
- Born: Unknown; Samarkand?
- Hometown: Samarkand
- Died: Unknown
- Venerated in: Church of the East

Sergius of Samarkand, also known as Mār Sargīs or Mar Sergius, was an ascetic and missionary of the Church of the East in which he is considered a major saint. His name is associated with numerous locations in Central Asia. Not much is known about his life except that he had retreated to the Altai Mountains and,^{:297} according to Mari ibn Suleiman's Book of the Tower and a letter written in about 1009 by Abdishō, the Metropolitan of Merv, to Catholicos-Patriarch John V in Baghdad, Mar Sergius is responsible for the conversion of the Keraites.

== Conversion legend ==
The Keraites' conversion to East Syriac Christianity around the year 1007 AD was recorded in the 12th-century Book of the Tower by Mari ibn Suleiman, and the 13th-century Chronicon Ecclesiasticum by Bar Hebraeus:^{:227–228}

The king of the people called Keraites was hunting in one of the high mountains of his country, he was overcome by a violent snowstorm, and wandered hopelessly out of the way. When he lost all hope of salvation, a saint [Mar Sergius] appeared to him in vision and said to him, "If you believe in Christ, I will lead you to the right direction, and you will not die here." When he [the king] promised him that he would become a lamb in the Christian sheepfold, he [the saint] directed him and led him to salvation; and when he reached his tents in safety, he summoned the Christian merchants who were there, and discussed with them the question of faith, and they answered him that this could not be accomplished except through baptism. [...] The king had set up a pavilion to take the place of an altar, in which was a cross and a Gospel, and named it after Mar Sergius, and he tethered a mare there and he takes her milk and lays it on the Gospel and the cross, and recites over it the prayers which he has learned, and makes the sign of the cross over it, and he and his people after him take a draught of it.

Hans-Joachim Klimkeit wrote in Christians in Asia before 1500: "The name of the Christian saint he [the king] met is given as Mar Sergius, who, as we know, hailed from Samarkand and who became a very popular saint in Central and East Asia, various monasteries being dedicated to him."^{:228}

== See also ==
- Barshabba
- Christianity in Central Asia
- Christianity among the Mongols
- Christianity among the Turkic peoples
