= Yohannan V =

Patriarch of the Church of the East

Mar Yohannan V
- Patriarch of the Church of the East
- Church: Church of the East
- See: Seleucia-Ctesiphon
- Installed: 1000
- Term ended: 1011
- Predecessor: Mari
- Successor: Yohannan VI
- Other posts: Bishop of Shenna, Metropolitan of Fars

Personal details
- Born: Yohannan bar Isa
- Died: 1011

Ordination history of Yohannan V
History
Episcopal consecration
- Consecrated by: Patriarch Mari
Episcopal succession
Bishops consecrated by Yohannan V as principal consecrator
- Elijah of Nisibis: 15 February 1002

Yohannan V Bar Isa was Patriarch of the Church of the East from 1000 to 1011. Brief accounts of Yohannan's patriarchate are given in the Ecclesiastical Chronicle of the Jacobite writer Bar Hebraeus (fl. 1280) and in the ecclesiastical histories of the Nestorian writers Mari ibn Suleiman (twelfth-century), ʿAmr ibn Mattā (fourteenth-century) and Ṣalībā ibn Yūḥannā (fourteenth-century).

== Life ==
Yohannan was bishop of al-Sin or Shenna when he was consecrated as archbishop of Fars by Patriarch Mari (r. 987–999). He ordained Elijah, the future archbishop of Nisibis, at the monastery of Mar Shemʿon in his role as bishop of Shenna on 15 September 994.

According to Bar Hebraeus:

After the catholicus Mari had fulfilled his office for fourteen years, he died in the first month of the year 390 of the Arabs, that is to say on the twenty-eighth day of the former kanun [December] in the year 1311 of the Greeks [AD 999]. He was succeeded by Yunanis II, (Note: Bar Hebraeus called Yohannan V and his predecessor Yohannan IV (900–05) Yunanis, an alternative name for Yohannan more frequently used in the Syrian Orthodox Church than in the Church of the East. For Bar Hebraeus, therefore, he is the patriarch 'Yunanis II'. The Nestorian sources correctly style him Yohannan V.) the metropolitan of Fars. This man, when he heard of the death of Mari, went to Shiraz, to the governor Baha al-Dawla, and won his support. Baha al-Dawla thereupon ordered that he should become catholicus. When the nobles of Baghdad heard that he had assumed the leadership uncanonically, by going to the governor's palace without being either elected or acclaimed, they were deeply offended, but were unable to oppose the edict. And so he was consecrated catholicus against the wishes of his people.

Yohannan consecrated Elijah as bishop of Beth Nuhadra (present-day Dohuk, Iraq) on 15 February 1002.

Bar Hebraeus also reported in his Ecclesiastical Chronicle that Abdisho, the Metropolitan of Merv, wrote and informed Catholicos Yohannan between 1007 and 1009 concerning the conversion of 200,000 Keraites to the Church of the East requesting directions concerning the observance of Lent for the Keraites lived almost exclusively on milk and meat and could not give up both. It is reported that Yohannan responded that a fast which we now call Molokan should be permitted to them.

== See also ==
- List of patriarchs of the Church of the East
- Sergius of Samarkand

== Notes ==
Church of the East titles
Preceded by Mari (987–999)	Catholicos-Patriarch of the East (1000–1011)	Succeeded by Yohannan VI (1012–1020)
