= Ishoyahb IV =

Mar Ishoʿyahb IV
- Patriarch of the Church of the East
- Church: Church of the East
- See: Seleucia-Ctesiphon
- Installed: 1020
- Term ended: 1025
- Predecessor: Yohannan VI
- Successor: Eliya I
- Other post: Bishop of Qasr and Nahrawan

Personal details
- Born: Ishoʿyahb bar Ezekiel
- Died: 1025
- Residence: Baghdad

Ishoʿyahb IV bar Ezekiel was Patriarch of the Church of the East from 1020 to 1025. He was an unpopular patriarch, who was defied by many of his metropolitans and bishops.

== Sources ==
Brief accounts of Ishoʿyahb's patriarchate are given in the Ecclesiastical Chronicle of the Jacobite writer Bar Hebraeus (fl. 1280) and in the ecclesiastical histories of the Nestorian writers Mari (twelfth-century), ʿAmr ibn Mattā and Ṣalībā ibn Yūḥannā (fourteenth-century). Modern assessments of his reign can be found in Jean-Maurice Fiey's Chrétiens syriaques sous les Abbassides and David Wilmshurst's The Martyred Church.

== Ishoʿyahb's patriarchate ==
The following account of Ishoʿyahb's patriarchate is given by Bar Hebraeus:

Yohannan VI was succeeded by Ishoʿyahb, the son of Ezekiel, bishop of Qasr. He was consecrated in the same year, on the third Sunday of the Annunciation, after he had given a bribe of 5,000 dinars to the governor, who ordered that all those who criticised this arrangement should be drowned. The bishop of Anbar read the gospel over him, and when he came to the verse 'And when they had dined', he left out the letter 'T' from the verb eshtari and mispronounced the verse as 'And when they had dismissed him' (eshari), alluding to the deposition of a tyrannical ruler. Many bishops refused to proclaim him in the diptychs. He fulfilled his office for four years and six months, being a man already old and bowed down in years, and died in the fourth month of the Arabs in the year 416 [AD 1025].

According to Mari, the manner of Ishoʿyahb's election was resented by many bishops, who left their dioceses and refused to allow his name to be proclaimed. Mari also said that Ishoʿyahb's short reign of four years and six months was marked by 'disputes and disorders painful to relate and unhelpful to explain', implying that the patriarch's instructions were defied by many of his metropolitans and bishops. Disorder even marked his death. Baghdad at this period was the frequent target of bandit raids and in 1025 its western suburb of Karkh was burned down in a particularly bold raid. Ishoʿyahb IV died in May 1025, and his funeral ceremony had to be held at night for fear that its traditional extravagance might attract unwelcome attention.

== See also ==
- List of patriarchs of the Church of the East

== Notes ==
Church of the East titles
Preceded by Yohannan VI (1012–1020)	Catholicos-Patriarch of the East (1020–1025)	Succeeded by Vacant (1025-1028); Eliya I (1028–1049)
