= Merv =

Ancient major city in Central Asia

- مرو (Persian); Marw (Persian)
- Alexandria; Antiochia in Margiana; Marw al-Shāhijān
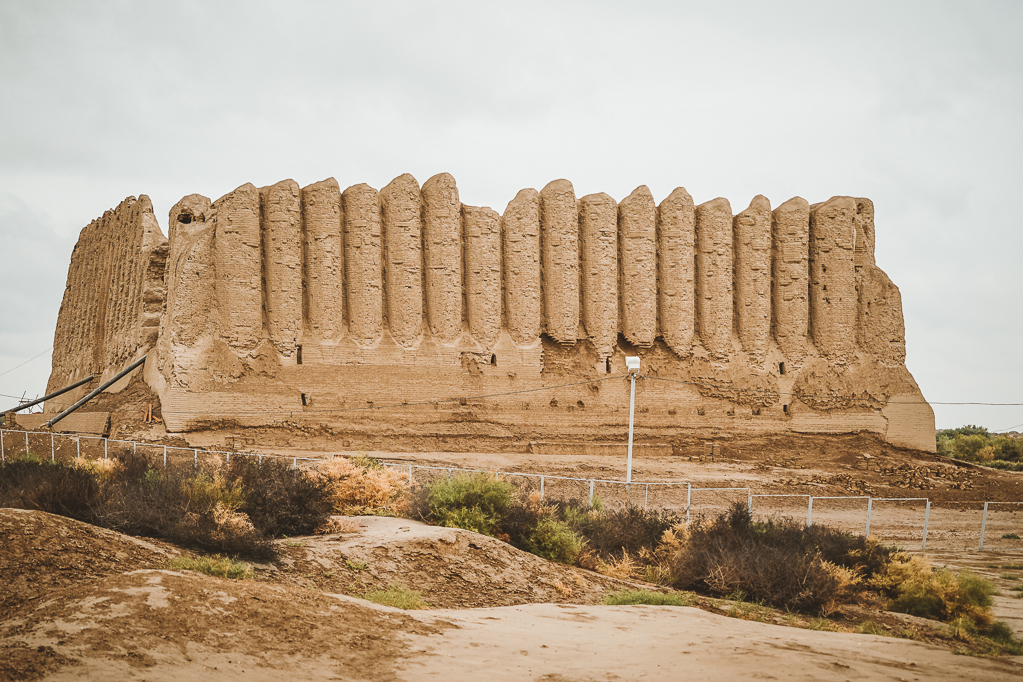
- Ruins of the city of Merv: the Great Kyz Kala.

- Location within West and Central Asia Location within Turkmenistan
- 37°39′46″N 62°11′33″E
- Type: Settlement
- Cultures: Persian, Buddhist, Arab, Seljuk, Mongol, Turkmen, Afghan
- Region: Central Asia

History
- Abandoned: 1789

Site notes
- Condition: In ruins

UNESCO World Heritage Site
- Official name: State Historical and Cultural Park "Ancient Merv"
- Type: Cultural
- Criteria: ii, iii
- Designated: 1999 (23rd session)
- Reference no.: 886
- Region: Asia-Pacific

Merv (Turkmen: Merw [ˈmeɾβ]; Persian: مرو [ˈmæɹv]), also called the Merve Oasis, (Note: Formerly known as Alexandria (Ancient Greek: Ἀλεξάνδρεια), Antiochia in Margiana (Ancient Greek: Ἀντιόχεια ἡ ἐν τῇ Μαργιανῇ), and Marw al-Shāhijān (Persian: مرو شاهجان)) was a major Iranian city in Central Asia, located on the historical Silk Road, near today's Mary, Turkmenistan. Human settlements on the site of Merv existed from the 3rd millennium BC until the 18th century AD. It changed hands repeatedly throughout history. Under the Achaemenid Empire, it was the center of the satrapy of Margiana. It was subsequently ruled by Hellenistic Kings, Parthians, Sasanians, Arabs (Rashidun, Umayyads and Abbasids), Ghaznavids, Seljuqs, Khwarazmians and Timurids, among others.

Merv served as the capital of several polities throughout its history. In the beginning of the 9th century, Merv was the seat of the Abbasid caliph al-Ma'mun and the capital of the entire Islamic caliphate. It served later as the seat of the Tahirid governors of Khorasan. In the 11th–12th centuries, Merv was the capital of the Great Seljuk Empire and remained so until its fall. Around this time, Merv turned into a chief centre of Islamic science and culture, attracting as well as producing renowned poets, musicians, physicians, mathematicians and astronomers. The great Persian polymath Omar Khayyam, among others, spent a number of years working at the observatory in Merv. As Persian geographer and traveller al-Istakhri wrote of Merv: "Of all the countries of Iran, these people were noted for their talents and education." Arab geographer Yaqut al-Hamawi counted as many as 10 giant libraries in Merv, including one within a major mosque that contained 12,000 volumes.

Merv was also a popular pilgrimage destination and several religions considered it holy. In Zoroastrianism, Merv or Mouru was one of 16 perfect lands created by god Ahura Mazda. Between the 5th and 11th centuries, Merv served as the seat of an East Syrian metropolitan province. A descendant of the Islamic prophet Muhammad, 8th Imam of Twelver Shia Islam, Ali ar-Ridha, moved to Merv from Baghdad and resided there for several years. Al-Muqanna, the "Veiled Prophet", who gained many followers by claiming to be an incarnation of God, was born and started his movement in Merv.

During the 12th and 13th centuries, Merv may have been the world's largest city with a population of up to 500,000. During this period, Merv was known as "Marw al-Shāhijān" (Merv the Great), and frequently referred to as the "capital of the eastern Islamic world". According to geographer Yaqut al-Hamawi, the city and its structures were visible from a day's journey away. In 1221, the city opened its gates to an invading Mongol horde, resulting in massive destruction. Historical accounts contend that the entire population, including refugees were killed; Tolui Khan is reported to have slaughtered 700,000 people. Though partly rebuilt after the Mongol destruction, the city never regained its former prosperity. Between 1788 and 1789, the city was razed for the last time, by Shah Murad of the Emirate of Bukhara, and its population deported. By the 1800s, under pressure from the Russians, the area surrounding Merv was completely deserted.

Today the site is preserved by the Government of Turkmenistan as the State Historical and Cultural Park "Ancient Merv". It was established in 1987 and is regulated by Turkmenistan's legislation. It is the oldest and best-preserved of the oasis cities along the historical Silk Road in Central Asia. A few buildings and structures still stand today, especially those constructed in the last two millennia. UNESCO has listed the site of ancient Merv as a World Heritage Site.

== History ==
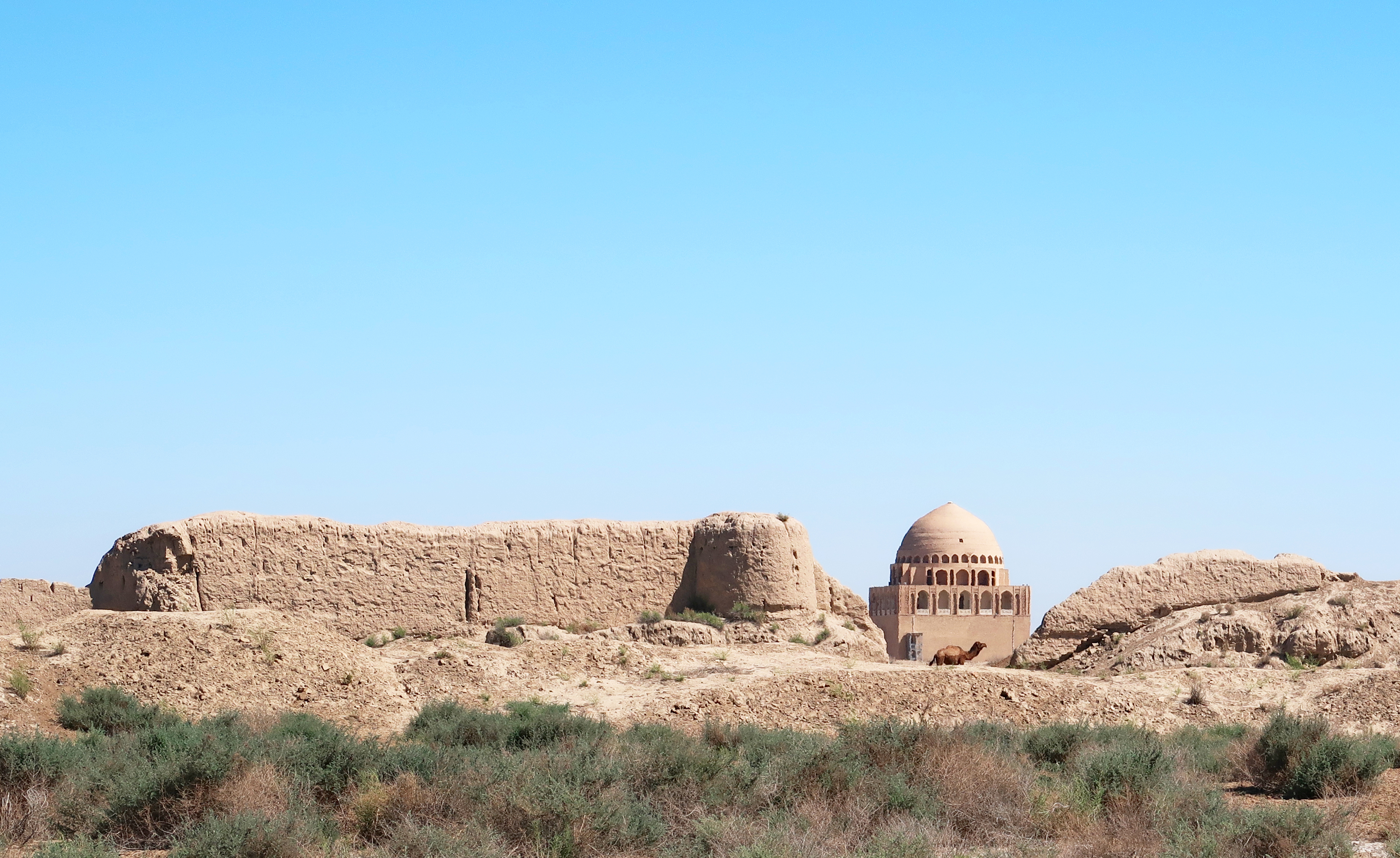
Ancient city of Merv, present day

Merv has prehistoric roots: archaeological surveys have revealed many traces of village life as far back as the 3rd millennium BC and have associated the area culturally with the Bactria-Margiana Archaeological Complex. The geography of the Zend-Avesta (commentaries on the Avesta) mentions Merv (under the name of Mouru) along with Balkh. In Zoroastrianism, the god Ahura Mazda created Mouru as one of sixteen perfect lands.

Under the Achaemenid Empire (c. 550–330 BC), the historical record mentions Merv as a place of some importance: under the name of Margu, it occurs as part of one satrapy in the Behistun inscriptions (c. 515 BC) of the Persian monarch Darius the Great. The first city of Merv was founded in the 6th century BC as part of the Achaemenid expansion into the region of Cyrus the Great (559–530 BC), but later strata deeply cover the Achaemenid levels at the site.

=== Hellenistic era ===
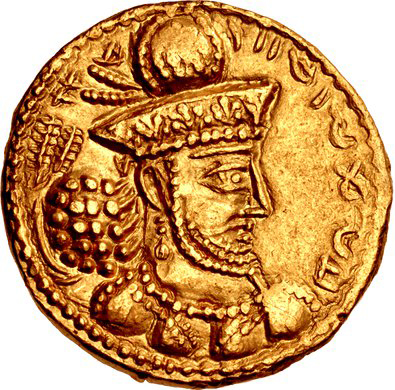
Coin of the Sassanian king, Shapur III, minted in Merv

Alexander the Great's visit to Merv is merely legendary, but the city was named Alexandria (Ἀλεξάνδρεια) after him for a time. After his death in 323 BC, it became the capital of the Province of Margiana of the Seleucid, Greco-Bactrian (256–125 BC), Parthian, and Sassanid states.

The Seleucid ruler Antiochus Soter (reigned 281–261 BC) renamed it to Antiochia Margiana. He rebuilt and expanded the city at the site presently known as Gyaur Gala fortress. Isidore of Charax wrote Antiochia was called the "unwatered" (Ἄνυδρος).

=== Parthian era ===
After the fall of the Seleucid dynasty (63 BC), Bactria, Parthia, and the Kushans took control in succession. In 53 BC, some 10,000 Roman prisoners of war from the Battle of Carrhae appear to have been deported to Merv.

Merv was a major city of Buddhist learning, with Buddhist monastery temples present for many centuries until its Islamisation. At the site of Gyaur Kala and Baýramaly, Buddhism was followed and practised often at the local Buddhist stupas.

=== Sasanian era ===
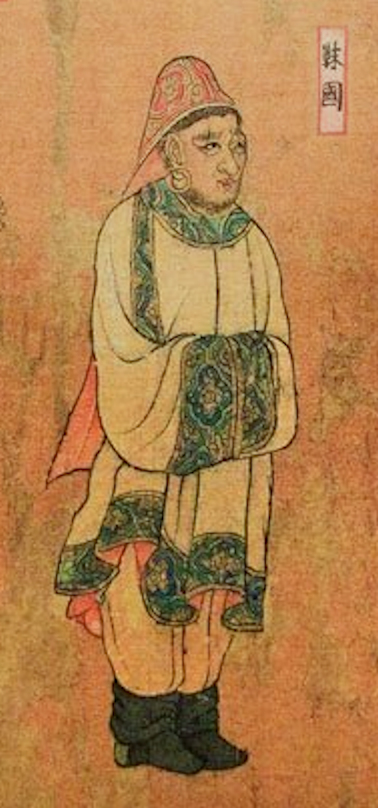
Ambassador of Merv (靺國 Moguo) to the Tang dynasty. Wanghuitu (王會圖), circa 650 CE.

After the Sasanid Ardashir I (220–240 AD) took Merv, the study of numismatics gives a clearer picture of the city’s history. A series of coins originally minted at Merv document almost four centuries of direct Sassanian rule without interruption. During this period, Merv was home to practitioners of various religions beside the official Sassanid Zoroastrianism, including Buddhists, Manichaeans, and Christians of the Church of the East. Between the 5th and 11th centuries, Merv served as the seat of an East Syrian metropolitan province. The first bishop was Barshabba (c.360/424). The Hephthalite occupation from the end of the 5th century to 565 AD briefly interrupted Sassanid rule.

=== Arab conquest and influence ===
Sassanian rule ended when the last Sassanian ruler, Yazdegerd III (632–651) was killed near the city and the Sassanian military governor surrendered to the approaching Arab army. Representatives of the Rashidun caliph, Umar, occupied the city, which became the capital of the Umayyad province of Khorasan. In 671, Ziyad ibn Abi Sufyan sent 50,000 Arab troops to Merv as a garrison. This colony retained its native Kufan sympathies and became the nucleus of Khurasan. Using the city as their base, the Arabs, led by Qutayba ibn Muslim from 705 to 715, brought large parts of Central Asia, including Balkh, Bukhara, and Fergana under subjugation. Merv, and Khorasan in general, became one of the first parts of the Persian-speaking world to become majority-Muslim. Arab immigration to the area was substantial. A Chinese man captured at Talas, Du Huan, was brought to Baghdad and toured the caliphate. He observed that in Merv, Khurasan, Arabs and Persians lived in mixed concentrations.

Merv gained renewed importance in February 748 when the Iranian general Abu Muslim (d. 755) declared a new Abbasid dynasty at Merv. He expanded the city, and, in the name of the Abbasid line, used the city as a base of rebellion against the Umayyad caliphate. After the Abbasids established themselves in Baghdad, Abu Muslim continued to rule Merv as a semi-independent prince until his eventual assassination. Indeed, Merv operated as the centre of Abbasid partisanship for the duration of the Abbasid Revolution of 746–750, and became a consistent source of political support for the Abbasid rulers in Baghdad later on; the governorship of Khurasan at Merv was one of the most important political figures of the Caliphate. The influential Barmakid family, based in Merv, played an important part in transferring Greek knowledge (established in Merv since the days of the Seleucids and Greco-Bactrians) into the Arab world.

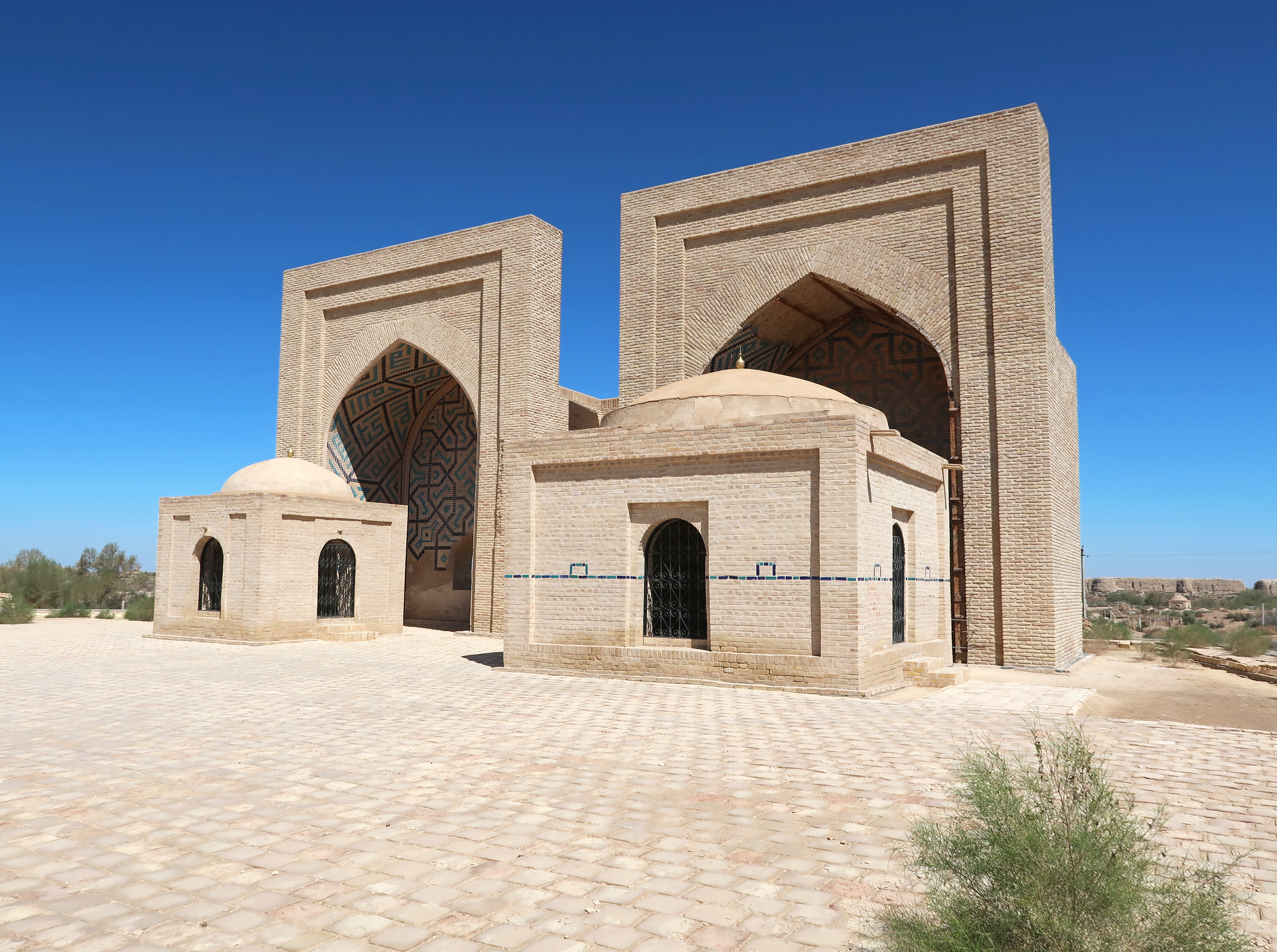
Mausoleums of Two Sahabi brothers, al-Aslamī and al-Ghifari, ancient Merv

Throughout the Abbasid era, Merv remained the capital and most important city of Khurasan. During this time, the Arab historian Al-Muqaddasi (c. 945/946–991) called Merv "delightful, fine, elegant, brilliant, extensive, and pleasant". Merv's architecture inspired the Abbasid re-planning of Baghdad. A 10th-century Arab historian, Ibn Hawqal, wrote of Merv: "and in no other city are to be seen such palaces and groves, and gardens and streams".

Merv was also known for its high-quality textiles. A 12th-century Arab geographer al-Idrisi noted: "From this country is derived much silk as well as cotton of a superior quality under the name of Merv cotton, which is extremely soft." The Islamic world admired the elegant robes and silk turbans produced in Merv. The city was notable as a home for immigrants from the Arab lands and those from Sogdia and elsewhere in Central Asia.

In the period from 813 to 818, the temporary residency of the caliph, al-Ma'mun effectively made Merv the capital of the Muslim world and highlighted Merv's importance to the Abbasids. A descendant of the Islamic prophet Muhammad, 8th Imam of Twelver Shia Islam, Ali ar-Ridha moved to Merv and lived there for several years. Merv also became the centre of a major 8th-century Neo-Mazdakite movement led by al-Muqanna, the "Veiled Prophet", who gained many followers by claiming to be an incarnation of God and heir to Abu Muslim; the Khurramiyya inspired by him, persisted in Merv until the 12th century.

During this period Merv, like Samarqand and Bukhara, functioned as one of the great cities of Muslim scholarship; the celebrated historian Yaqut (1179–1229) studied in its libraries. Merv produced a number of scholars in various branches of knowledge, such as Islamic law, hadith, history, and literature. Several scholars have the name "Marwazi" (المروزي) designating them as hailing from Merv. The city continued to have a substantial Christian community. In 1009, the Archbishop of Merv sent a letter to the Patriarch at Baghdad asking that the Keraites be allowed to fast less than other Nestorian Christians. Great Persian polymath Omar Khayyam, among others, spent several years working at the observatory in Merv. As Persian geographer and traveller al-Istakhri wrote of Merv: "Of all the countries of Iran, these people were noted for their talents and education." Yaqut al-Hamawi counted as many as 10 giant libraries in Merv, including one within a major mosque that contained 12,000 volumes.

As the caliphate weakened, Persian general Tahir b. al -Husayn and his Tahirid dynasty replaced Arab rule in Merv in 821. The Tahirids ruled Merv from 821 to 873, followed by the Saffarids, then the Samanids and later the Ghaznavids.

=== Turkmens in Merv ===
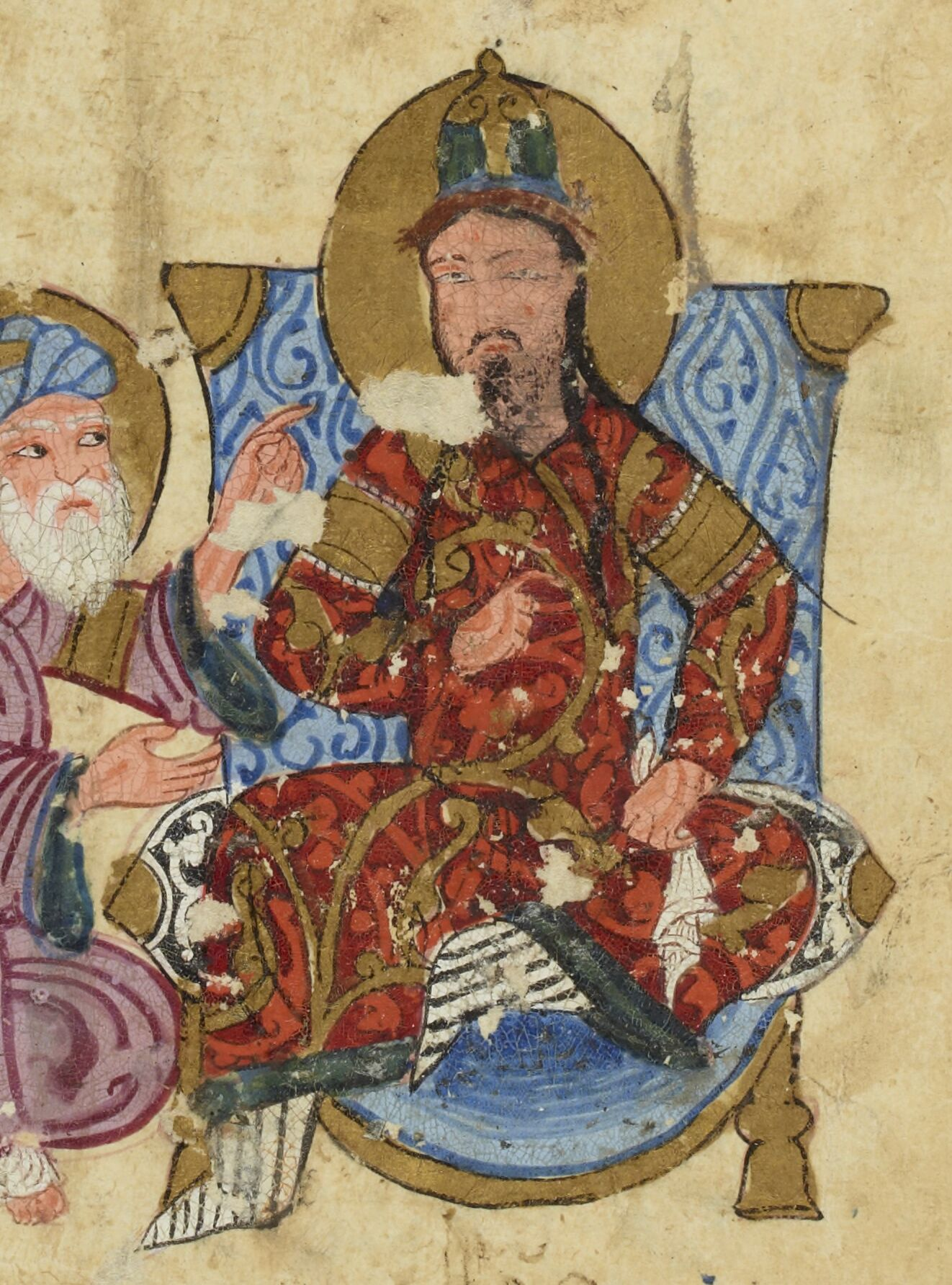
The Governor of Merv, wearing the Turkic sharbūsh hat, in Maqamat al-Hariri (1200–1210).

In 1037, the Seljuq Turkmens, a clan of Oghuz Turks moving from the steppes east of the Aral Sea, peacefully took over Merv under the leadership of Tughril—the Ghaznavid sultan Mas'ud I was extremely unpopular in the city. Tughril's brother Chaghri stayed in Merv as the Seljuq domains grew to include the rest of Khurasan and Iran, and it subsequently became a favourite city of the Seljuq sultans. Chaghri, his son Alp Arslan (sultan from 1063 to 1072) and great-grandson Ahmad Sanjar (sultan from 1118 to 1157) were buried at Merv, the latter at the Tomb of Ahmad Sanjar.

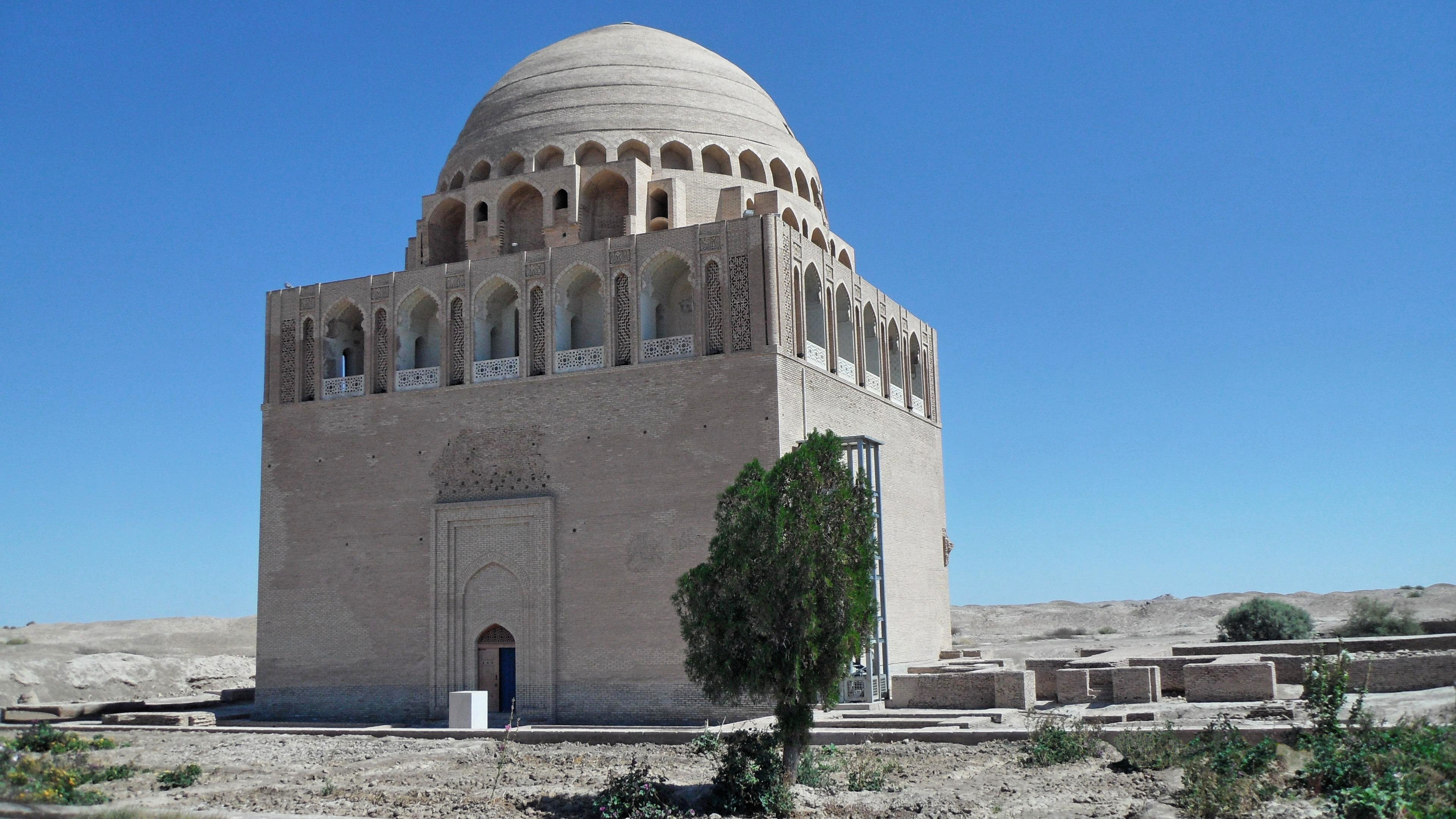
Mausoleum of the Seljuq sultan Ahmad Sanjar

Nearing the end of the 11th century, Merv became the eastern capital of the split Seljuq state. However, starting from 1118, it served as the capital of the whole empire. During this period, Merv expanded to its greatest size—Arab and Persian geographers termed it "the mother of the world", the "rendezvous of great and small", the "chief city of Khurasan" and the "capital of the eastern Islamic world". Written sources also attest to a large library and madrasa founded by Nizam al-Mulk, vizier of the Seljuq empire, as well as many other major cultural institutions. Perhaps most importantly, Merv had a market described as "the best of the major cities of Iran and Khurasan".

Sanjar's rule, marked by conflict with the Kara-Khitai and Khwarazmians, ended in 1153 when Turkmen nomads from beyond the Amu Darya pillaged the city. Subsequently, Merv changed hands from the Turkmen nomads to the Ghurids in 1192, and to the Khwarizmians in 1204. According to Tertius Chandler, by 1150 Merv was the world's largest city, with a population of 200,000. By 1210, it may have had as many as 500,000 residents, preceding such medieval metropolises as Constantinople and Baghdad.

=== Mongols in Merv ===
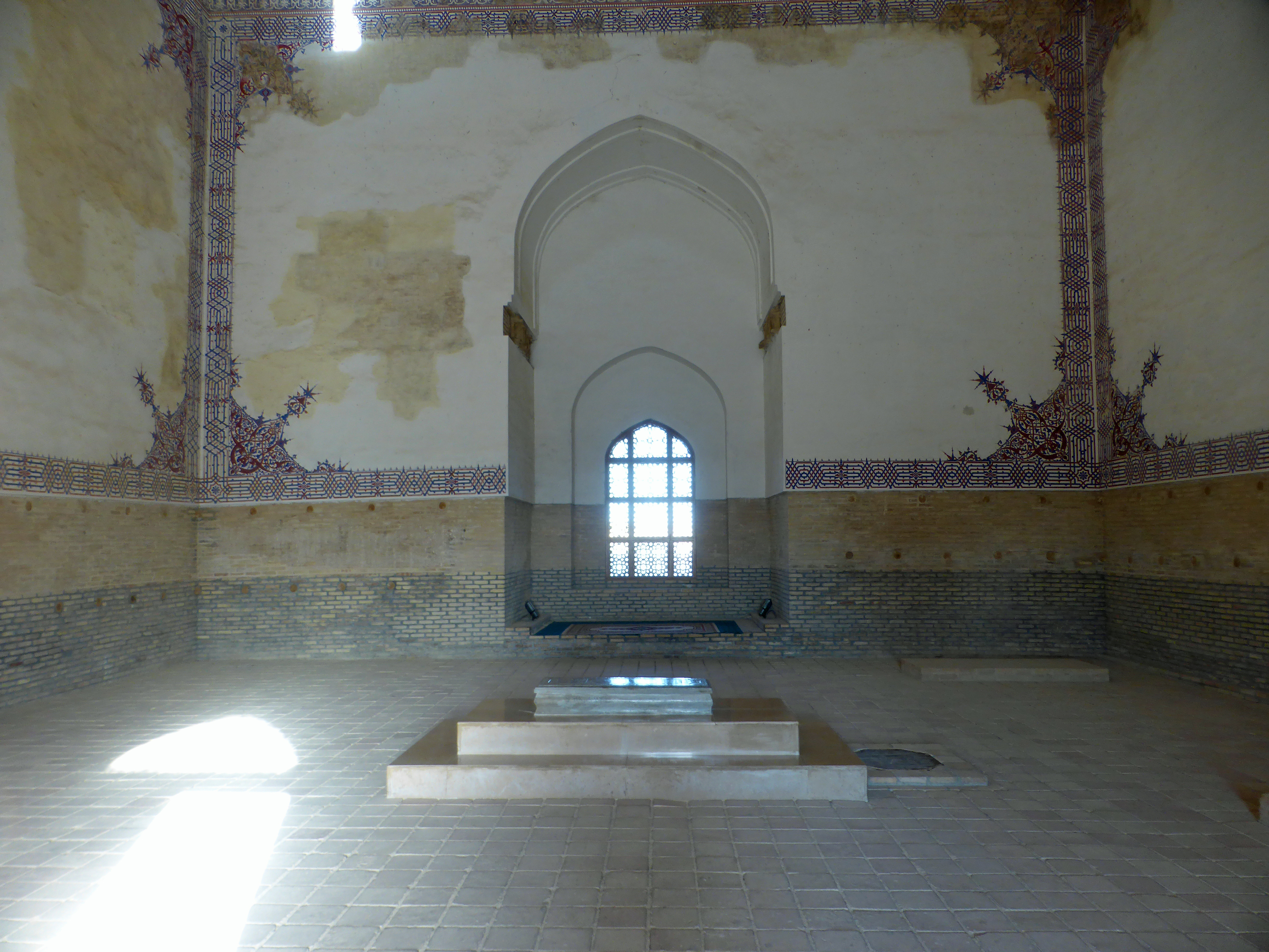
Inside the Mausoleum of Ahmad Sanjar

In 1221, Merv opened its gates to Tolui, son of Genghis Khan, chief of the Mongols. Most of the inhabitants are said to have been butchered. Arab historian Ibn al-Athir described the event basing his report on the narrative of Merv refugees:

Genghis Khan sat on a golden throne and ordered the troops who had been seized should be brought before him. When they were in front of him, they were executed and the people looked on and wept. When it came to the common people, they separated men, women, children and possessions. It was a memorable day for shrieking and weeping and wailing. They took the wealthy people and beat them and tortured them with all sorts of cruelties in the search for wealth ... Then they set fire to the city and burned the tomb of Sultan Sanjar and dug up his grave looking for money. They said, "These people have resisted us" so they killed them all. Then Genghis Khan ordered that the dead should be counted and there were around 700,000 corpses.

A Persian historian, Juvayni, put the figure at more than 1,300,000. Each individual soldier of the conquering army "was allotted the execution of three to four hundred persons", many of those soldiers being levies from Sarakhs who, because of their town's enmity toward Merv, "exceeded the ferocity of the heathen Mongols in the slaughter of their fellow-Muslims." Almost the entire population of Merv, and refugees arriving from the other parts of the Khwarazmian Empire, were slaughtered, making it one of the bloodiest captures of a city in world history.

Excavations revealed the drastic rebuilding of the city's fortifications in the aftermath of their destruction, but the city's prosperity had passed. The Mongol invasion spelled the eclipse of Merv and other major centres for more than a century. After the Mongol conquest, Merv became part of the Ilkhanate, and it was consistently looted by Chagatai Khanate. In the early part of the 14th century, the town became the seat of a Christian archbishopric of the Eastern Church under the rule of the Kartids, vassals of the Ilkhanids. By 1380, Merv belonged to the empire of Timur (Tamerlane).

=== Uzbeks in Merv and its final destruction ===
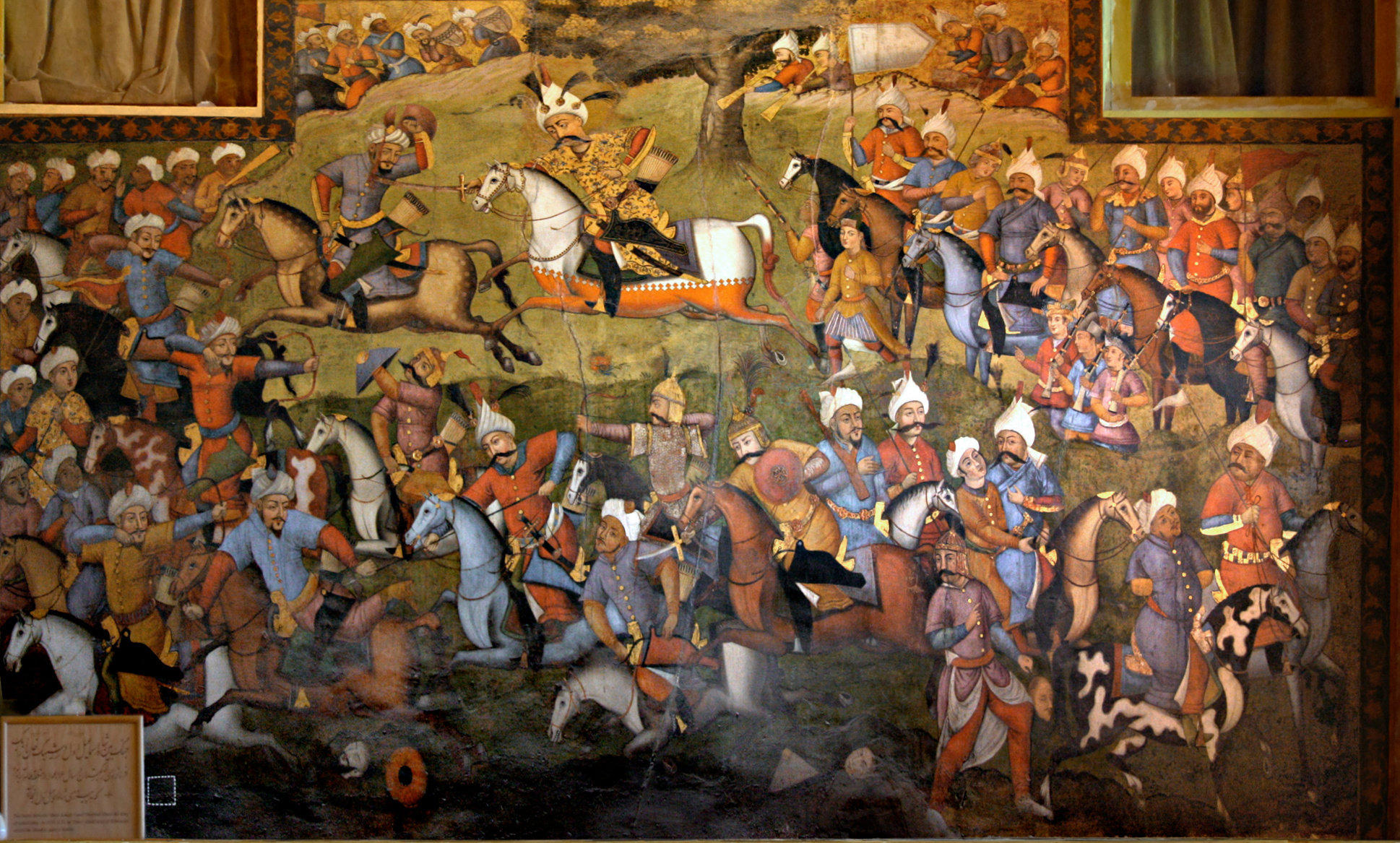
Fresco depicting the battle of Merv of 1510 between Shah Ismail I and the Uzbek Khan Muhammad Shaybani. Located at the Chehel Sotoun Palace in Isfahan, Iran

In 1505, the Uzbeks occupied Merv. Five years later, Shah Ismail I, the founder of the Safavid dynasty of Iran, expelled them. In this period, a Persian nobleman restored a large dam, the Soltanbent, on the river Murghab. The settlement which developed in the irrigated area became known as Baýramaly.

After Shah Ismail's death, the region became a dependency of Khiva. However, in 1593, Merv was conquered by Abdullah Khan II of Bukhara. The city was soon captured by Shah Abbas. A Safavid governor, Biktash Khan Ustajlu, was appointed to the governorship in 1600.

In 1608, Mihrab Khan Qajar became governor, beginning two centuries of Qajar governorship over Merv. From 1715, the Qajar elite began to assert Merv's independence from the Safavid government, but within a decade the oasis became insecure due to raids by Tatars and Turkmens. Nader Shah launched military campaigns that cowed the Turkmens and Tatars and restored Merv's irrigation system. After Nader Shah's death, the local Qajars in the region declared independence and formed the Qajar Principality of Merv. In 1785, the Manghit amir of Bukhara, Shah Murad, attacked the city and killed the ruler, Bayram 'Ali Khan Qajar. A few years later, in 1788 and 1789, Shah Murad razed the city to the ground, and broke down the dams, leaving the area a waste land.

The entire population of the city and the surrounding oasis of about 100,000 were then deported in several stages to the Bukharan oasis and the Samarkand region in the Zarafshan Valley. Being the last remaining Persian-speaking Shias, the deportees resisted assimilation into the Sunni population of Bukhara and Samarkand, despite the common Persian language they spoke with most natives. These Marvis survive as of 2016; Soviet censuses listed them as "Iranis/Iranians" through the 1980s. They live in Samarkand and Bukhara and the area in between on the Zarafshan river. They are listed as Persian speaking but counted separately from the local Tajiks because of their Shia religion and their maintaining of their ancient Mervi identity.

=== Nineteenth century ===
Merv passed to the Khanate of Khiva in 1823. Sir Alexander Burnes traversed the country in 1832. About this time, the Persians forced the Tekke Turkmens, then living on the Tejen River, to migrate northward. Khiva contested the Tekkes' advance, but in about 1856, the latter became the sovereign power in the country, and remained so until the Russians occupied the oasis in 1884. By 1868, the Russians had taken most of what would become Russian Central Asia except Turkmenistan. The Russians approached this area from the Caspian, and in 1881, they captured Geok Tepe in one of the bloodiest battles in the region. Much of the civilian population that was unable to flee was later massacred by the Russian troops. The Russians further occupied the oasis of Tejen, eighty miles to the west. The next Russian move was south toward Herat. By 1888, the city was entirely abandoned.

A future viceroy of British India, George Curzon visited the remains of Merv in 1888. He later wrote: "In the midst of an absolute wilderness of crumbling brick and clay, the spectacle of walls, towers, ramparts and domes, stretching in bewildering confusion to the horizon, reminds us that we are in the centre of bygone greatness."

== Remains ==
Some exploratory excavations at Merv were conducted in 1885 by the Russian general A. V. Komarov, the governor of the Transcaspian oblast, 1883–1889; Komarov employed his troops as excavators and published his collection of trophy artifacts and coins from the area in 1900. Valentin Alekseevich Zhukovsky of the Imperial Archaeological Commission directed the first fully professional dig in 1890 and published in 1894. Geologist Raphael Pumpelly and a German archaeologist, Hubert Schmidt, directed the American Carnegie Institute's excavations.

Merv is the focus of the Ancient Merv Project (initially called the International Merv Project). From 1992 to 2000, a joint team of archaeologists from Turkmenistan and the UK have made remarkable discoveries. In 2001, the Institute of Archaeology, University College London and the Turkmen authorities started a new collaboration. This Ancient Merv Project is concerned with the complex conservation and management issues posed by this site, furthering understanding of the site through archaeological research, and disseminating the results of the work to the widest possible audience.

=== Organization of remains ===
Merv consists of a few discrete walled cities very near to each other constructed on uninhabited land by builders of different eras, used, and then abandoned and never rebuilt. Four walled cities correspond to the chief periods of Merv's importance: the oldest, Erkgala, corresponds to Achaemenid Merv, the smallest of the three. Gäwürgala (also known as Gyaur Gala), which surrounds Erkgala, comprises the Hellenistic and Sassanian metropolis and also served as an industrial suburb to the Abbasid/Seljuk city, Soltangala—by far the largest of the three. The smaller Timurid city was founded a short distance to the south and is now called Abdyllahangala. Other ancient buildings are scattered between and around these four cities; all the sites are preserved in the "Ancient Merv Archaeological Park" just north of the modern village of Baýramaly and 30 kilometres (19 mi) east of the large Soviet-built city of Mary.

==== Erk Gala ====
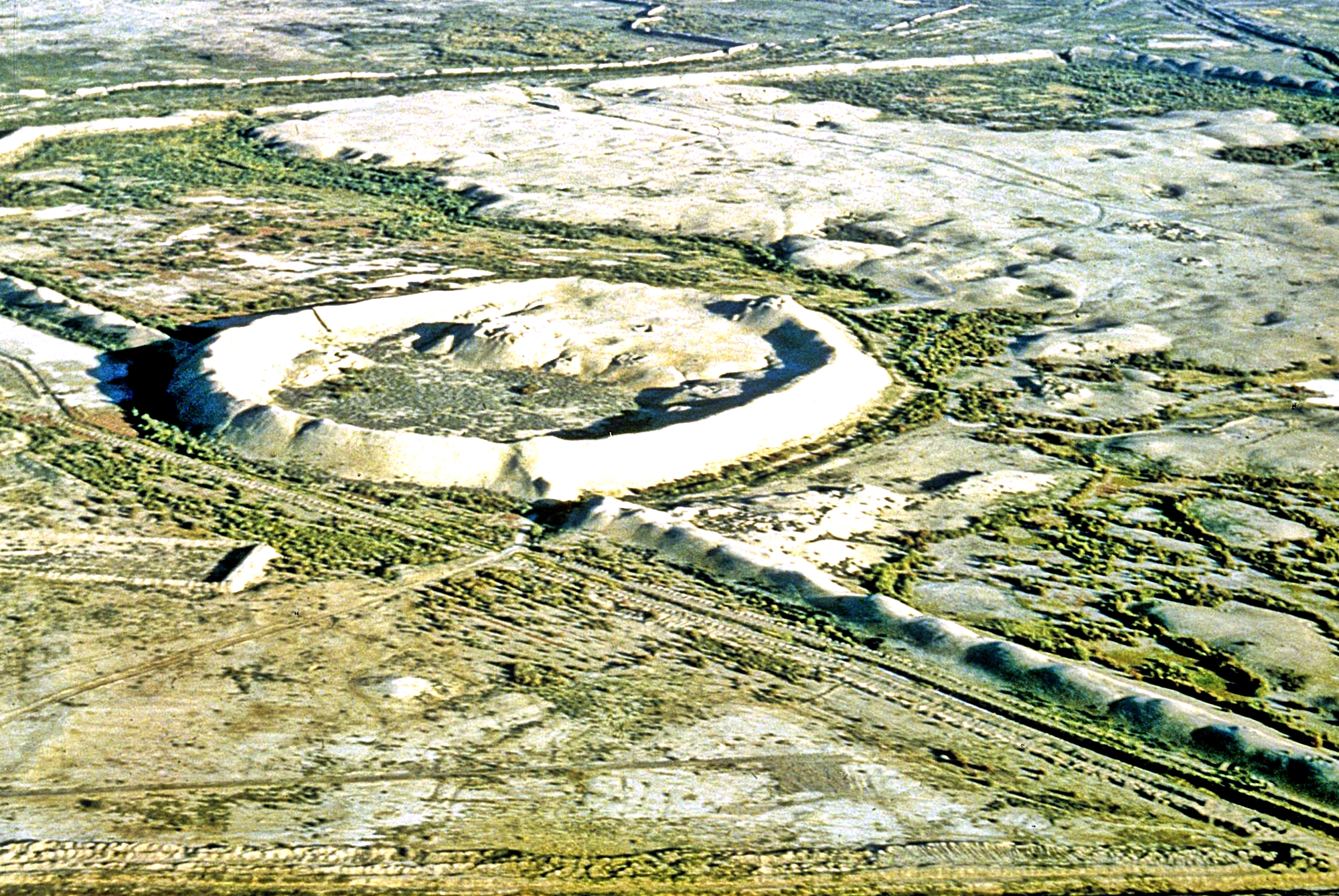
The oldest part of Merv, known as Erk Gala

Erk Gala (from Persian, "the citadel fort") is the oldest part of the city of Merv complex. Built in the 7th century BC, Erk Gala was built as a Persian Style fortress controlling the oasis on the Murghab River. The Erk Gala fortress later served as the acropolis for the Hellenistic city and later the Arc of the Islamic city.

==== Gäwürgala ====
The foundation of Gäwürgala (Turkmen from the Persian "Gabr Qala", "Fortress of the Zoroastrians") occurred in the early Hellenistic era under the rule of the Seleucid king Antiochus I. The city was continuously inhabited under a series of Hellenistic rulers, by the Parthians, and then under the Sassanids, who made it the capital of a satrapy. Gäwürgala was the capital of the Umayyad province of Khurasan and grew in importance as Khurasan became the most loyally Muslim part of the Iranian world during Islam's first two centuries.

Gäwürgala's most visible remaining structures are its defensive installations. Three walls, one built atop the next, are in evidence. A Seleucid wall, graduated in the interior and straight on the exterior, forms a platform for the second, larger wall, built of mudbricks and stepped on the interior. The form of this wall is like other Hellenistic fortresses found in Anatolia, though this is unique for being made of mudbrick instead of stone. The third wall is possibly Sassanian and is built of larger bricks. Surrounding the wall were a variety of pottery sherds, particularly Parthian ones. The size of these fortifications is evidence of Merv's importance during the pre-Islamic era; no pre-Islamic fortifications of comparable size have been found anywhere in the Garagum. Gäwürgala is also important for the vast amount of numismatic evidence it has revealed; an unbroken series of Sassanian coins has been found there, hinting the extraordinary political stability of this period. Even after the foundation of Soltangala by Abu Muslim at the start of the Abbasid dynasty, Gäwürgala persisted as a suburb of the larger Soltangala. In Gäwürgala are concentrated many Abbasid-era "industrial" buildings: pottery kilns, steel, iron and copper-working workshops and so on. A well-preserved pottery kiln has an intact vaulted arch support and a square firepit. Gäwürgala seems to have been the craftsmen's quarters throughout the Abbasid and pre-Seljuk periods.

==== Soltangala ====
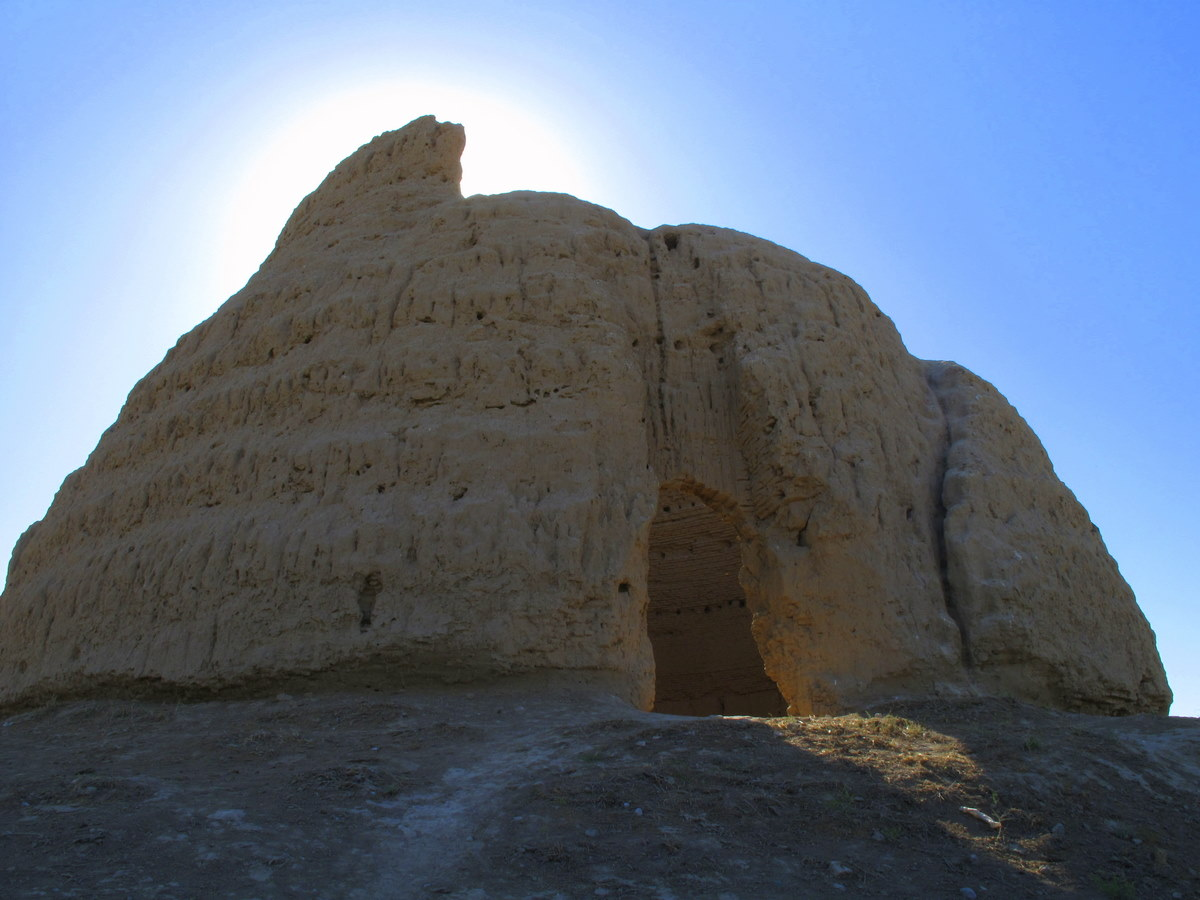
7th century Great Ice House, Merv

Soltangala (from "Sultan Qala", the sultan's fortress) is by far the largest of Merv's cities. Textual sources establish it was Abu Muslim, the leader of the Abbasid rebellion, who symbolised the beginning of the new Caliphate by commissioning monumental structures to the west of the Gäwürgala walls, in what then became Soltangala. The area was quickly walled and became the core of medieval Merv; the many Abbasid-era köshks (fortified building) discovered in and outside Soltangala attest to the centuries of prosperity which followed. Kushks (Persian, Kushk, "pavilion", "kiosk"), which comprise the chief remains of Abbasid Merv, are a building type unique to Central Asia during this period. A kind of semi-fortified two-story palace, whose corrugated walls give it a unique and striking appearance, köshks were the residences of Merv's elite. The second storey of these structures comprised living quarters; the first storey may have been used for storage. Parapets lined the roof, which was often used for living quarters as well. Merv's largest and best-preserved Abbasid köşk is the Greater Gyzgala (Turkmen, "maiden's fortress"), located just outside Soltangala's western wall; this structure consisted of 17 rooms surrounding a central courtyard. The nearby Lesser Gyzgala had extraordinarily thick walls with deep corrugations, as well as multiple interior stairways leading to second storey living quarters. All of Merv's kushks are in precarious states of preservation.

However, the most important of Soltangala's surviving buildings are Seljuq constructions. Seljuq leader Toghrul's conquest of Merv in 1037 revitalised the city; under his descendants, especially Sanjar, who made it his residence, Merv found itself at the centre of a large multicultural empire.

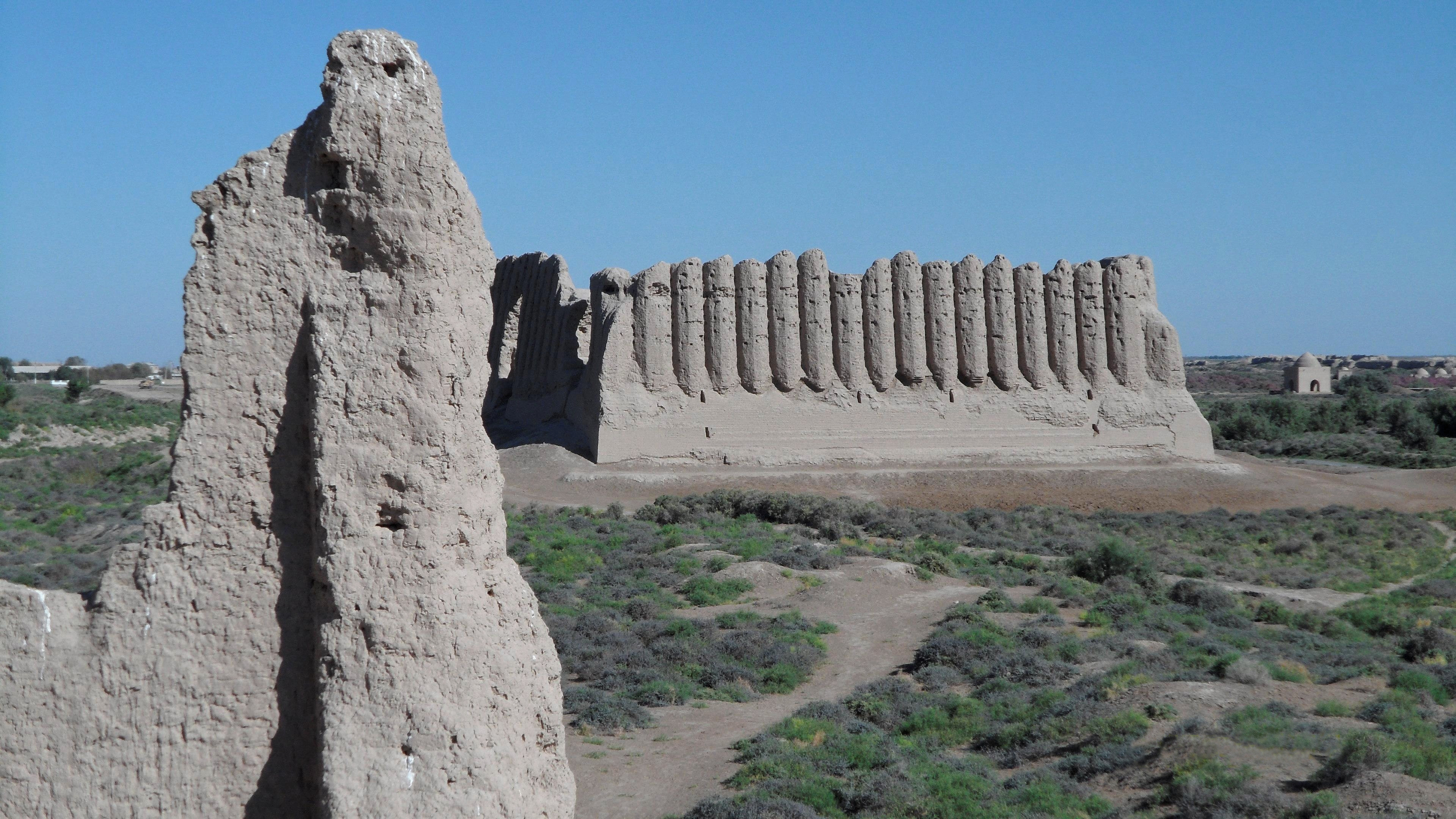
Great Kyz Qala (fortress), Merv

Evidence of this prosperity is found throughout the Soltangala. Many of these buildings are concentrated in Soltangala's citadel, the Shahryar Ark (Persian, "the Sovereign's citadel"), is on its east side. In the centre of the Sharhryar Ark is the Seljuk palace, probably built by Sanjar. The surviving mud brick walls lead to the conclusion that this palace, though relatively small, was composed of tall, single-storey rooms surrounding a central court along with four axial iwans at the entrance to each side. Low areas nearby seem to indicate a large garden, which included an artificial lake; similar gardens were found in other Central Asian palaces. Any remnants of interior or exterior decoration have been lost because of erosion or theft.

Another notable Seljuk structure within the Shahryar Ark is the kepderihana (from the Persian, "Kaftar Khaneh", or "pigeon house", i.e., the columbarium). This mysterious building, among the best-preserved in the whole Merv oasis, comprises one long and narrow windowless room with many tiers of niches across the walls. Some sources Believe the kepter khana (there are more elsewhere in Merv and Central Asia) was a pigeon roost used to raise pigeons, to collect their dung, which was used in growing the melons for which Merv was famous. Others see the kepderihanas as libraries or treasuries, because of their location in high status areas next to important structures.

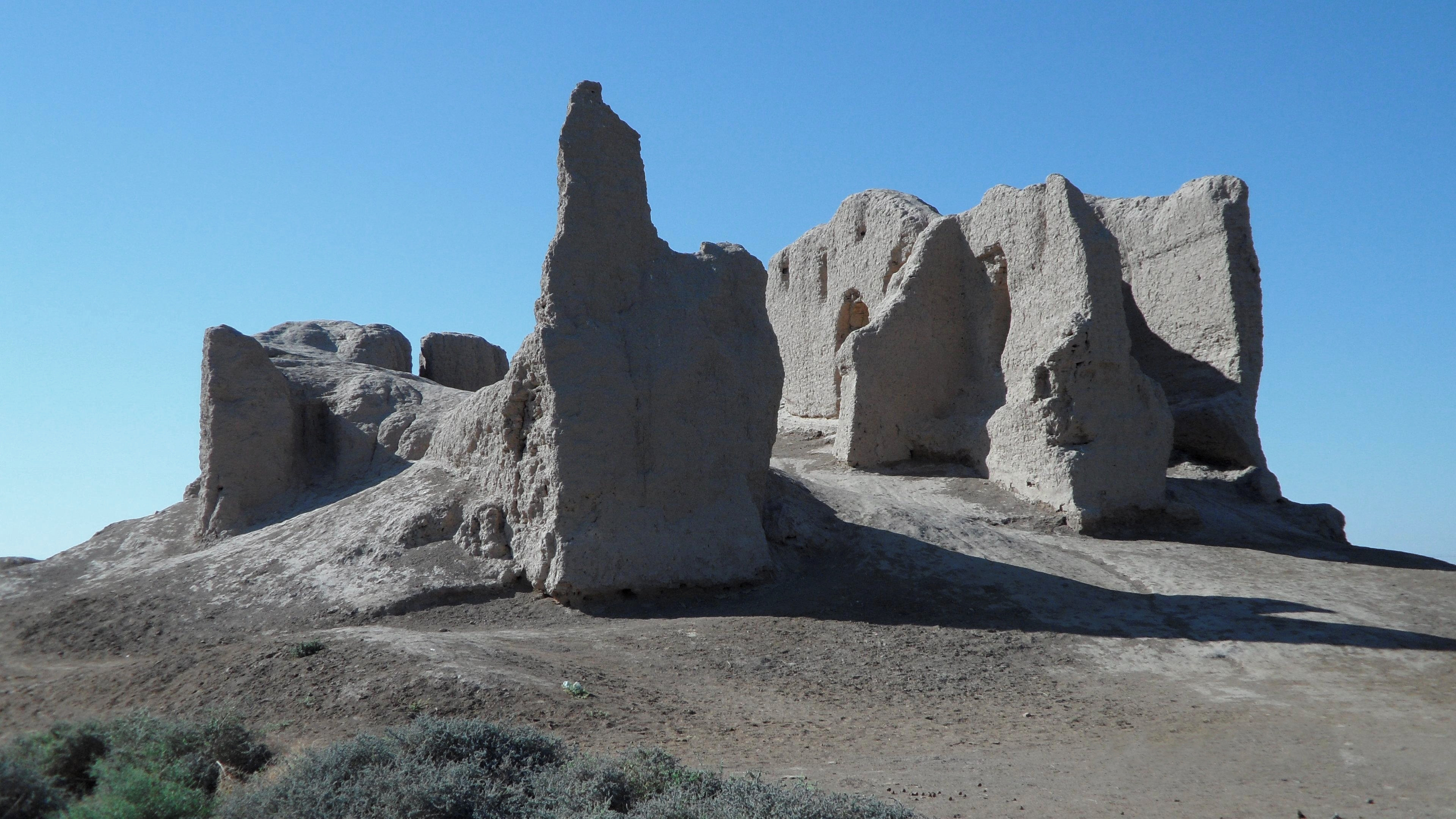
Little Kyz Qala (fortress), Merv

The best-preserved of all the structures in Merv is the 12th-century mausoleum of Sultan Sanjar, also in Sultan Gala. It is the largest of Seljuk mausoleums and is also the first dated mosque-mausoleum complex, a form which was later to become common. It is square, 27 metres (89 ft) per side, with two entrances on opposite sides; a large central dome supported by an octagonal system of ribs and arches covers the interior (Ettinghausen, 270). The dome's exterior was turquoise, and its height made it imposing; it was said that approaching caravans could see the mausoleum while still a day's march from the city. The mausoleum's decoration, in typical early Seljuk style, was conservative, with interior stucco work and geometric brick decoration, now mainly lost, on the outside. Except for the recently "reconstructed" exterior decoration, the largely intact mausoleum remains just as it was in the 12th century.

A final set of Seljuq remains are the walls of the Soltangala. These fortifications, which largely remain, began as eight-to-nine-metre-high (26 to 30 ft) mud brick structures, inside of which were chambers for defenders to shoot arrows from. There were horseshoe-shaped towers every 15 to 35 metres (49 to 115 ft). These walls, however, did not prove to be effective because they were not of adequate thickness to withstand catapults and other artillery. By the mid-12th century, the galleries were filled in, and the wall was greatly strengthened. A secondary, smaller wall was built in front of the Soltangala's main wall, and finally the medieval city's suburbs—known today as Isgendergala—were enclosed by a 5-metre-thick (16 ft) wall. The three walls held off the Mongol army for at least one of its offensives, before ultimately succumbing in 1221.

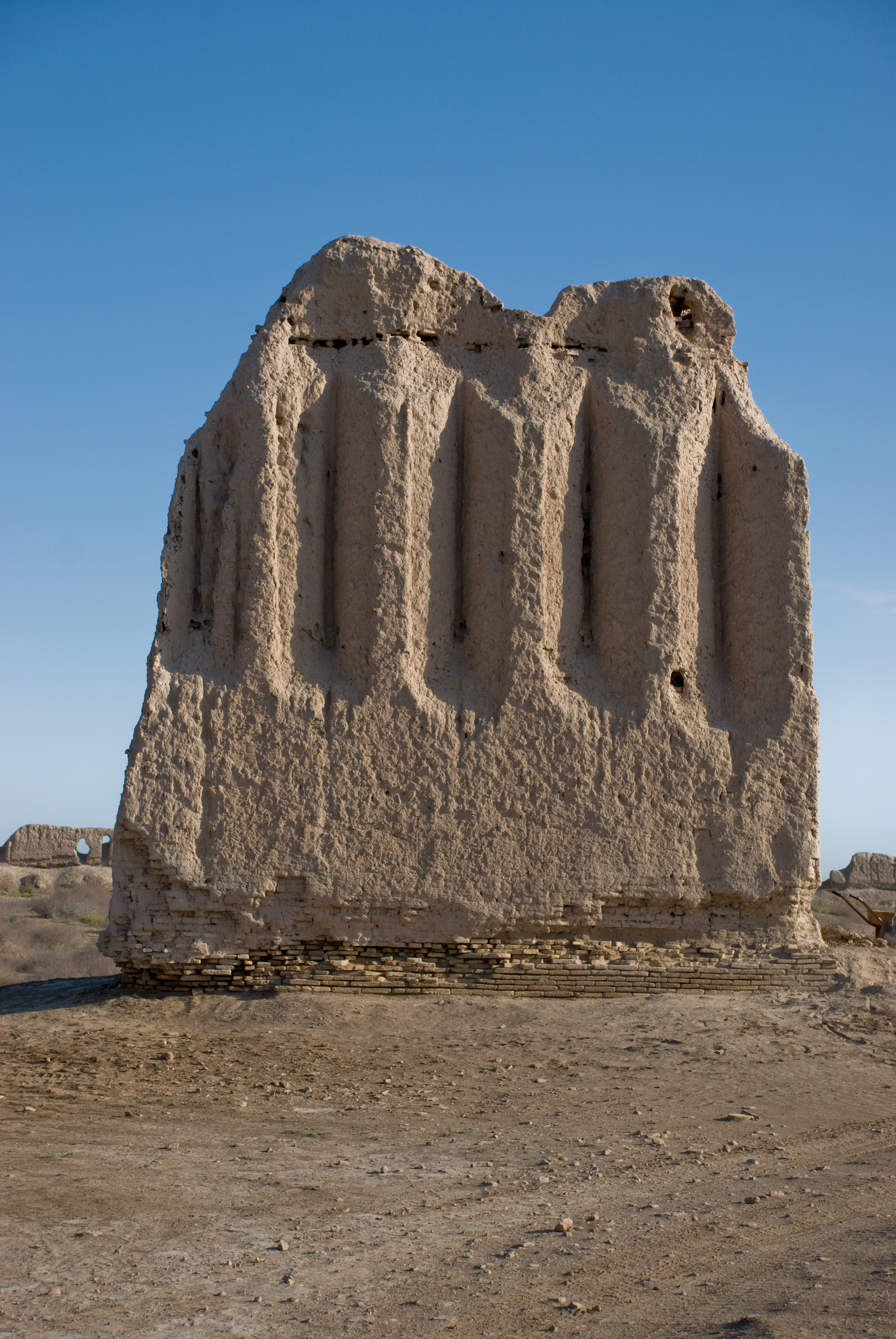
Exterior of Kepderihana's south wall

Many ceramics have been recovered from the Abbasid and Seljuk eras, primarily from Gäwürgala, the city walls of Soltangala, and the Shahryar Ark. The Gäwürgala ware was primarily late Abbasid and consisted primarily of red slip-painted bowls with geometric designs. The pottery recovered from the Sultan Gala walls is dominated by 11th to 12th-century colour-splashed yellow and green pottery, similar to contemporary styles common in Nishapur. Turquoise and black bowls were discovered in the Shahryar Ark palace, as well as a deposit of Mongol-style pottery, perhaps related to the city's unsuccessful re-foundation under the Il-khans. Also from this era, is a ceramic mask used for decorating walls found among the ruins of what is believed—not without controversy—to be a Mongol-built Buddhist temple in the southern suburbs of Sultan Gala.

==== Shaim Kala ====
Shaim Kala was built in the 7th century AD. Shaim Kala was a self-contained walled city intended to relieve over-crowding, and to deal with the religious and political discontent of the newly arrived peoples.

==== Abdyllahangala ====
Abdyllahangala is the post medieval Timurid era city to the south of the main complex.

== Demographics ==
Today, the site of the ancient Merv is located near Baýramali city of Mary velayat, Turkmenistan. It is a city in and the seat of Baýramaly District, Mary Province, Turkmenistan. It lies about 27 km east of the provincial capital Mary. In 2009, its population was estimated at 88,486 (up from 43,824 in the 1989 census).

The present inhabitants of the oasis are primarily Turkmens of the Teke tribe and some Persians or Tajiks. There are relatively large minorities of the Baluch and the Brahui in the Merv Oasis as well.

== Economy ==
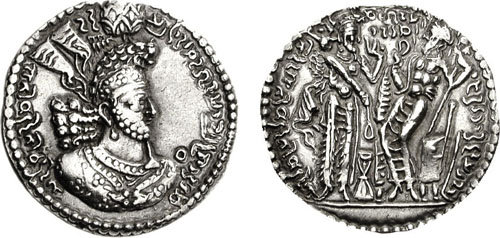
Hormizd I Kushanshah, Merv mint

An elaborate system of canals cut from the Murghab irrigates the oasis. The country is renowned throughout the East for its fertility. Every kind of cereal and many fruits grow in great abundance, e.g. wheat, millet, barley and melons, also rice and cotton. Cotton seeds from archaeological levels as far back as the 5th century are the first indication that cotton textiles were already an important economic component of the Sassanian city. Silkworms have been bred. Turkmens possess a famous breed of horses (Turkoman horse) and keep camels, sheep, cattle, asses and mules. Turkmens work in silver and armour. One discovery of the 1990s excavations was a 9th- to 10th-century workshop where crucible steel was being produced, confirming contemporary Islamic reports by Islamic scholar al-Kindi (AD 801–866). He referred to the region of Khorasan as producing steel. This was made by a co-fusion process where cast iron and wrought iron are melted together.

== Geography ==
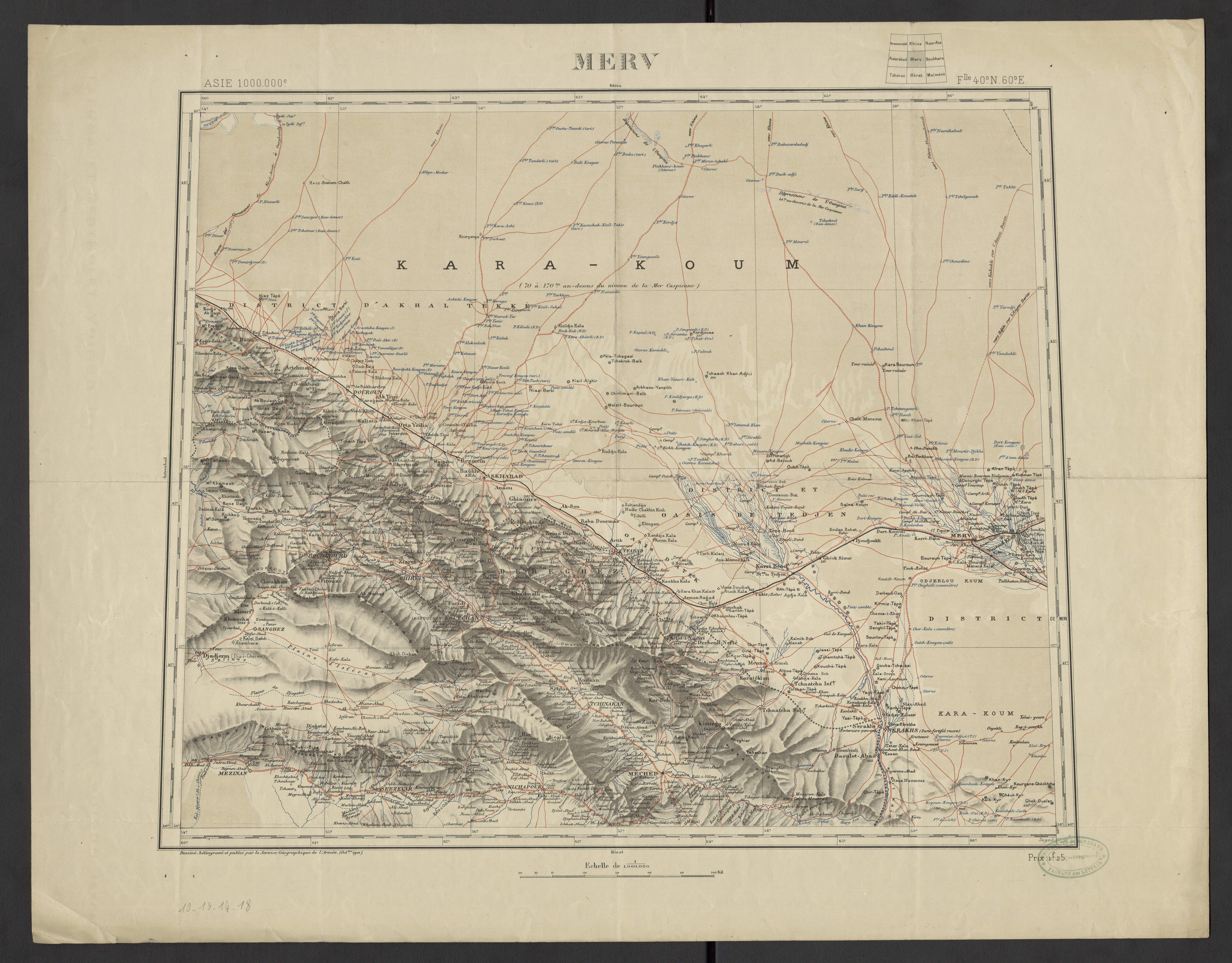
Merv oasis on a 1913 map

The oasis of Merv is situated on the Murghab River that flows down from Afghanistan, on the southern edge of the Karakum Desert, at 37°30’N and 62°E, about 230 miles (370 km) north of Herat, and 280 miles (450 km) south of Khiva. Its area is about 1,900 square miles (4,900 km^{2}). The great chain of mountains which, under the names of Paropamisade and Hindu Kush, extends from the Caspian Sea to the Pamir Mountains is interrupted some 180 miles (290 km) south of Merv. Through or near this gap flow northwards in parallel courses the Tejen and Murgab rivers, until they lose themselves in the Karakum Desert. Thus, they make Merv a sort of watch tower over the entrance into Afghanistan on the north-west and at the same time create a stepping-stone or étape between north-east Persia and the states of Bukhara and Samarqand.

Merv is advantageously situated in the inland delta of the Murghab River, which flows from its source in the Hindu Kush northwards through the Garagum desert. The Murghab delta region, known to the Greeks as Margiana, gives Merv two distinct advantages: first, it provides an easy southeast–northwest route from the Afghan highlands towards the lowlands of Karakum, the Amu Darya valley and Khwarezm. Second, the Murgab delta, being a large well-watered zone in the midst of the dry Karakum, serves as a natural stopping-point for the routes from northwest Iran towards Transoxiana—the Silk Roads. The delta, and thus Merv, lies at the junction of these two routes: the northwest–southeast route to Herat and Balkh (to the Indus and beyond) and the southwest–northeast route from Tus and Nishapur to Bukhara and Samarkand.

This place was a stop on the Silk Road during the time of the Han dynasty. Here merchants could trade for fresh horses or camels at this oasis city.

== International relations ==
UNESCO has listed the site of ancient Merv as a World Heritage Site.

=== Twin towns – sister cities ===
Merv is twinned with:

- Aleppo, Syria
- Balkh, Afghanistan
- Baghdad, Iraq
- Bukhara, Uzbekistan
- Damascus, Syria
- Dubai, United Arab Emirates
- Gaza City, Palestine
- Jerusalem, Israel/Palestine
- Karbala, Iraq
- Khujand, Tajikistan
- Kirkuk, Iraq
- Konye-Urgench, Turkmenistan
- Kuwait City, Kuwait
- Lahore, Pakistan
- Mecca, Saudi Arabia
- Medina, Saudi Arabia
- Nisa, Turkmenistan
- Nishapur, Iran
- Samarkand, Uzbekistan

== Gallery ==
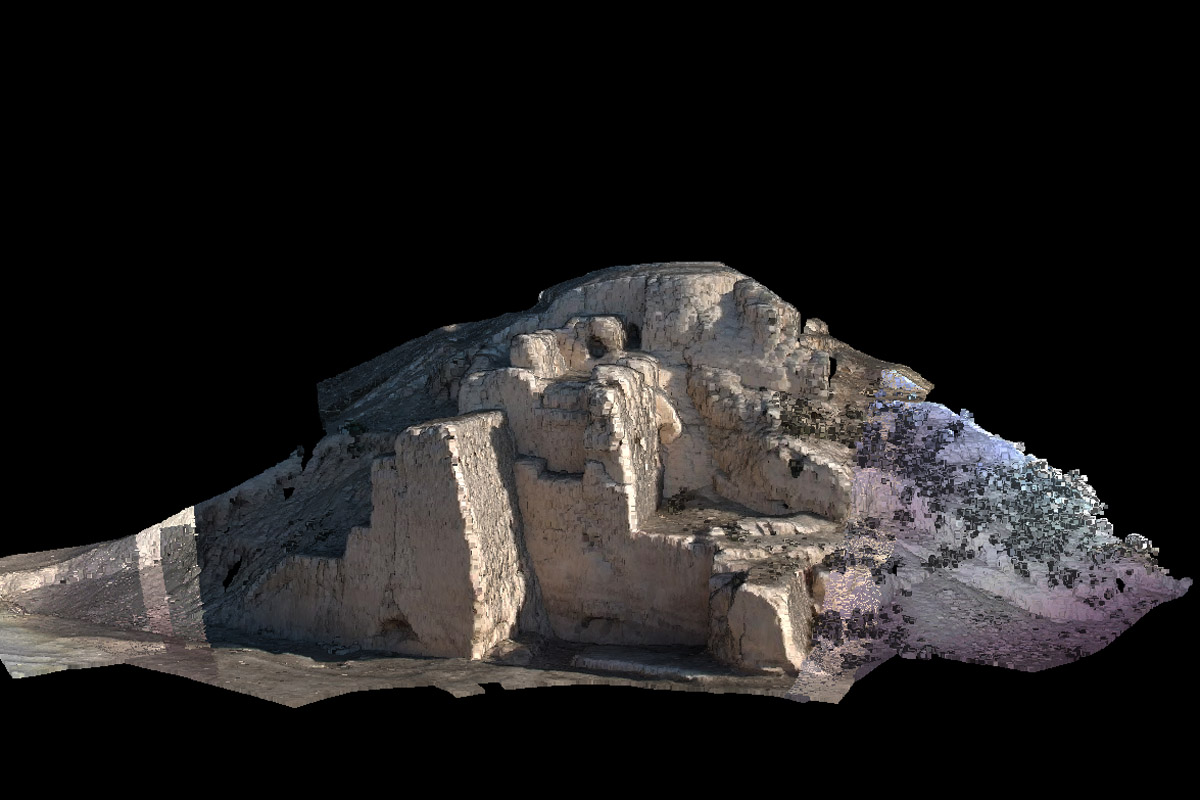
Photo-textured 3D laser scan image of Gäwürgala town walls

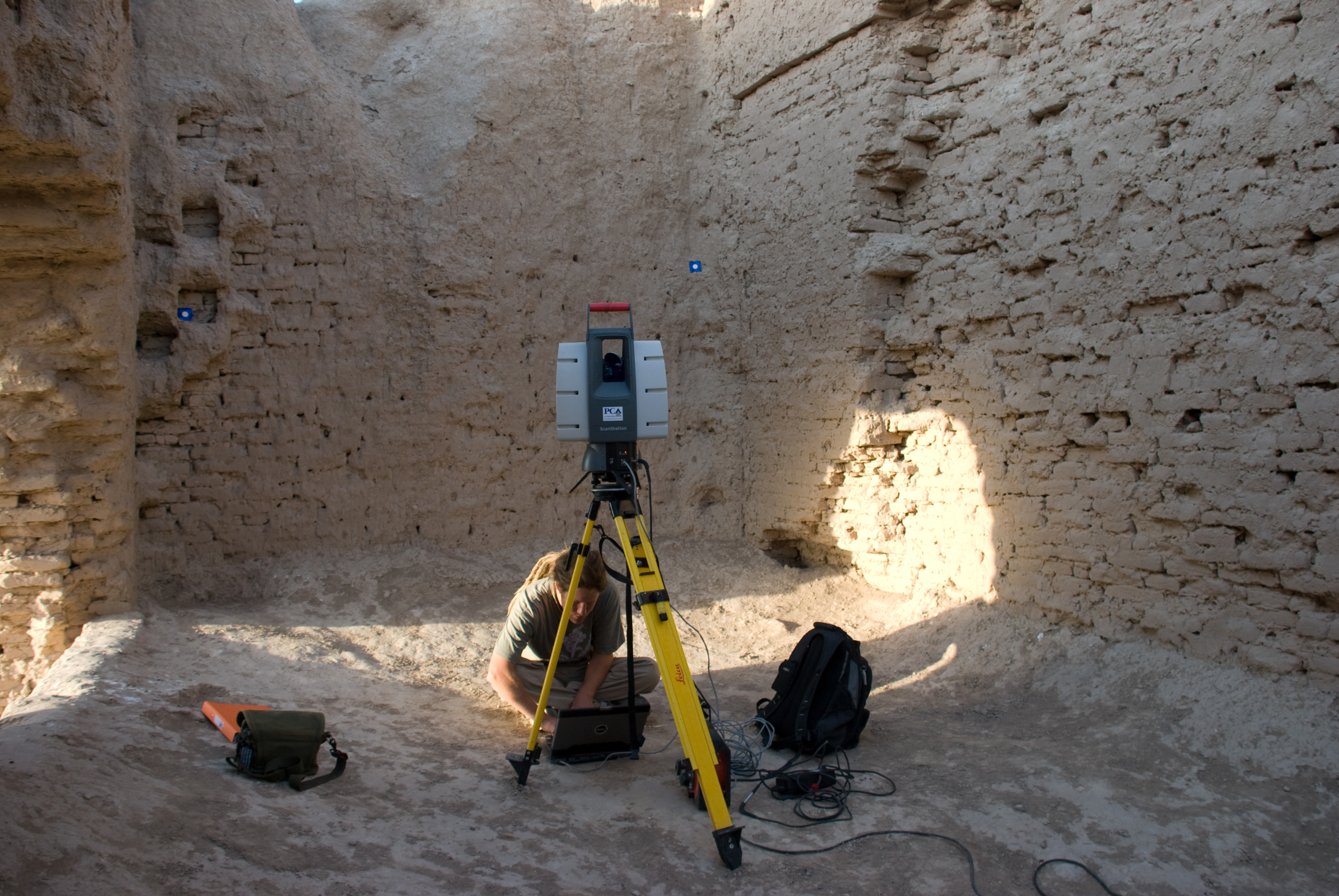
Interior of Kepderihana, with a 3D laser scanner positioned for work

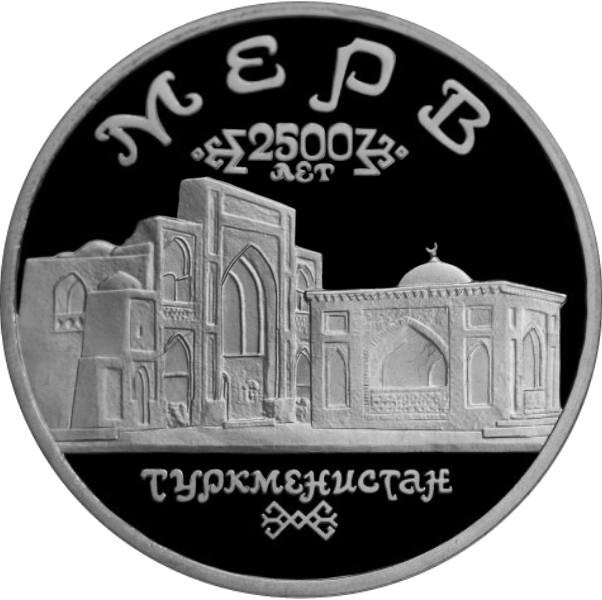
Landmarks of ancient Merv on a 1993 Russian commemorative coin

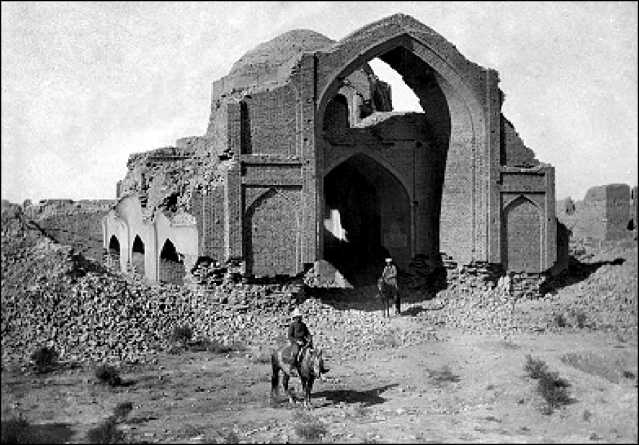
Merv Mosque (end of the 19th century)

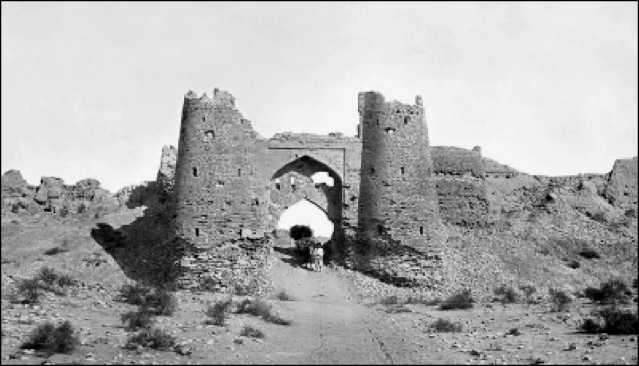
Ancient Merv (end of the 19th century)

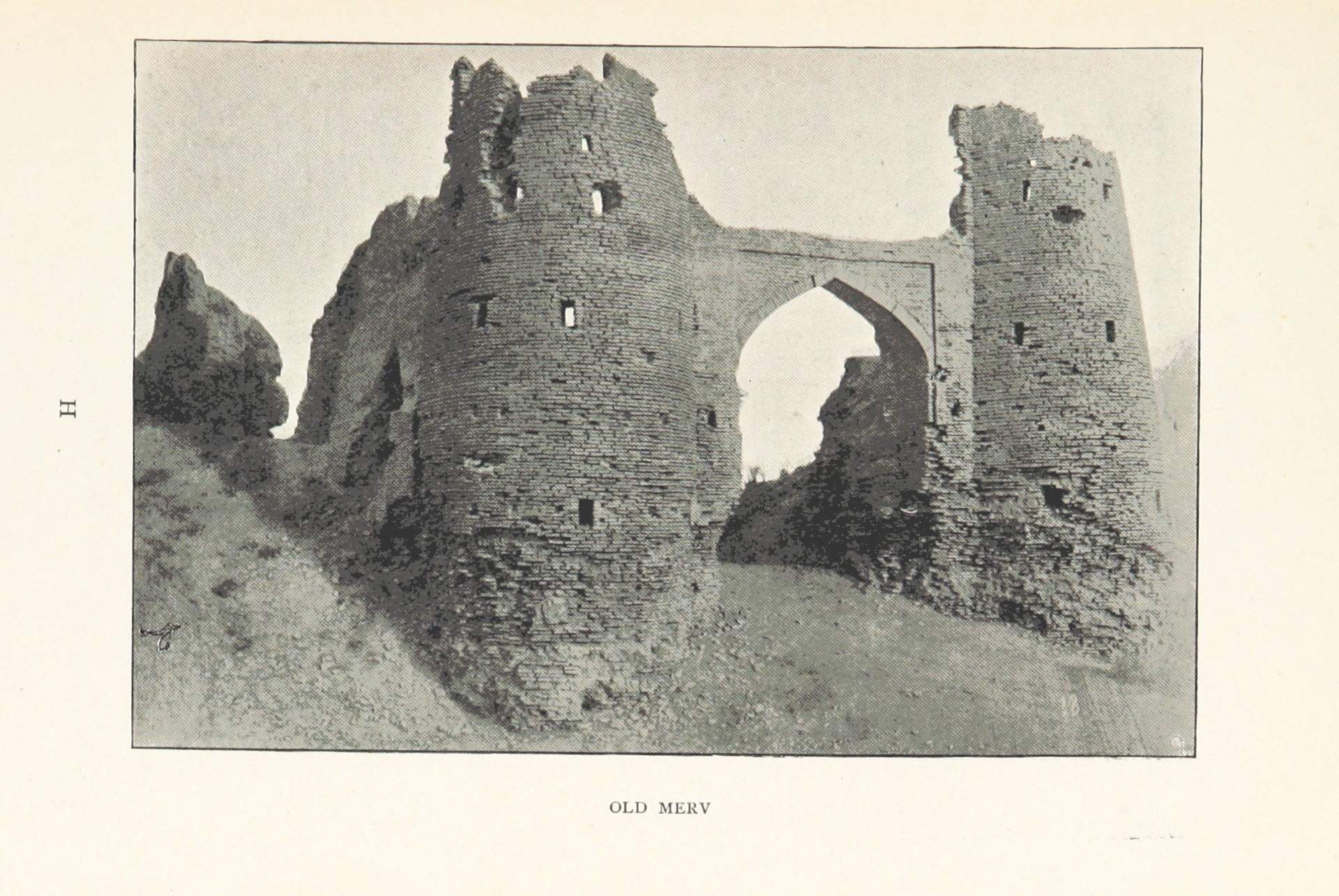
Merv, 1899

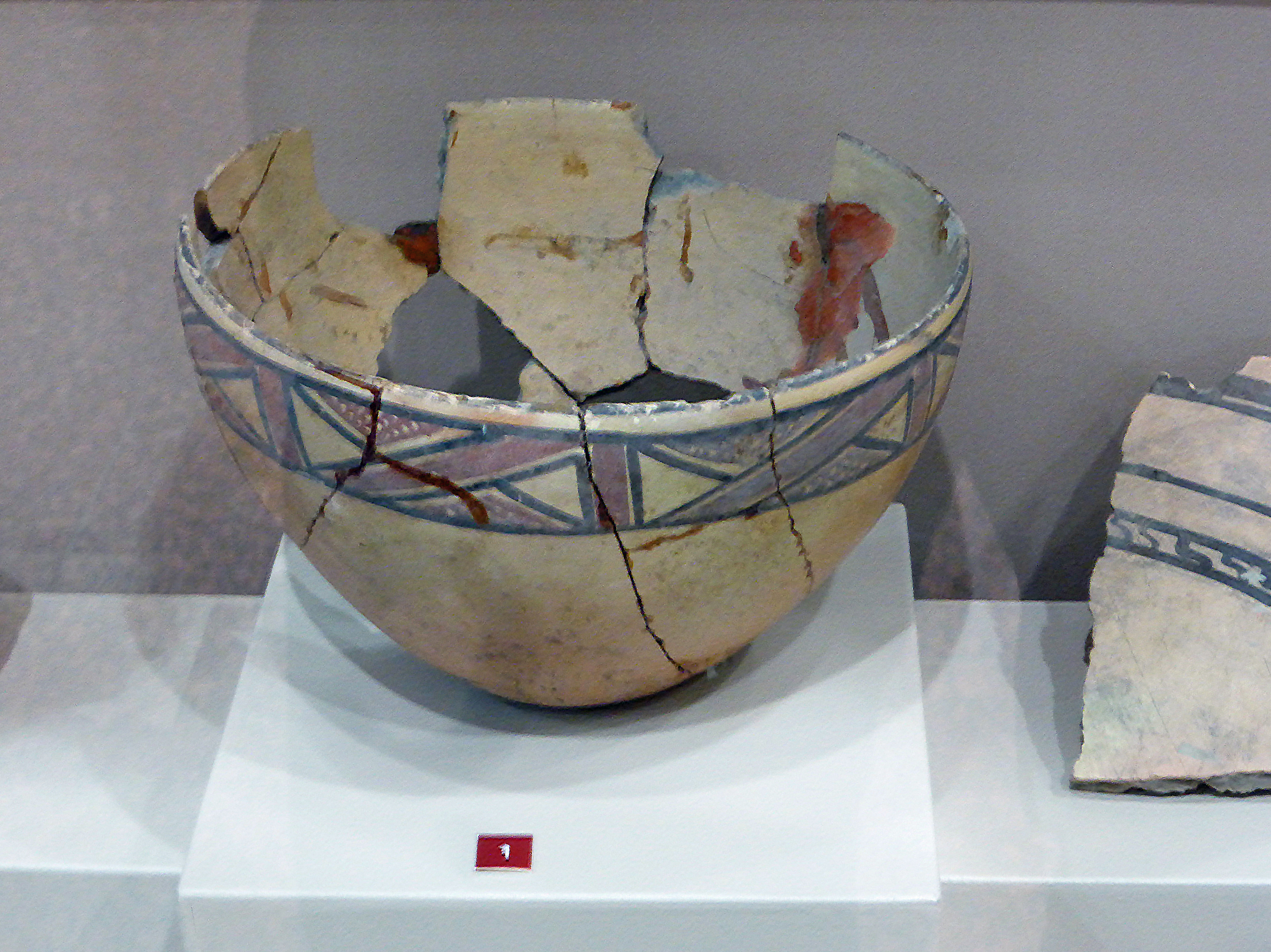
Merv pottery

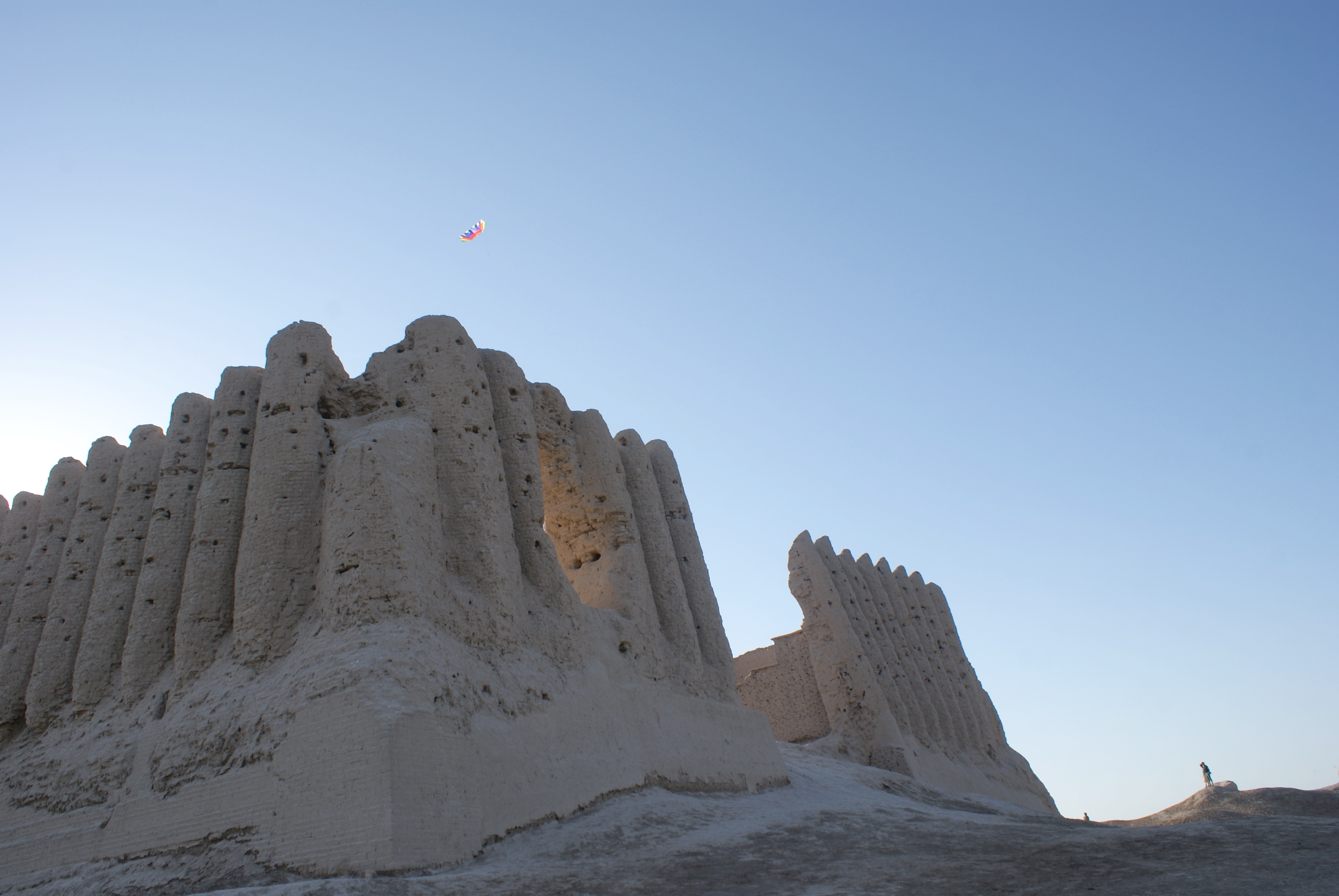
Great Kyz Kala

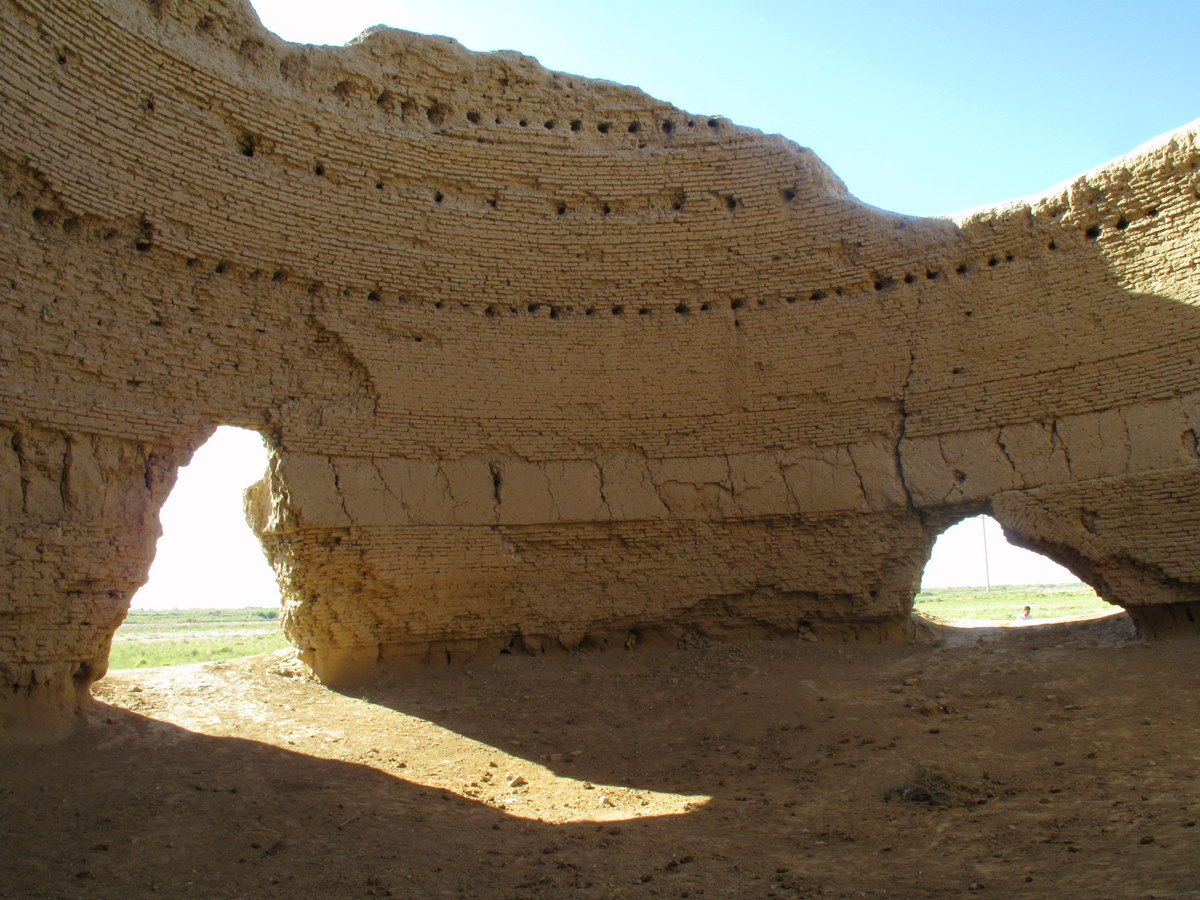
Interior of the Ice House

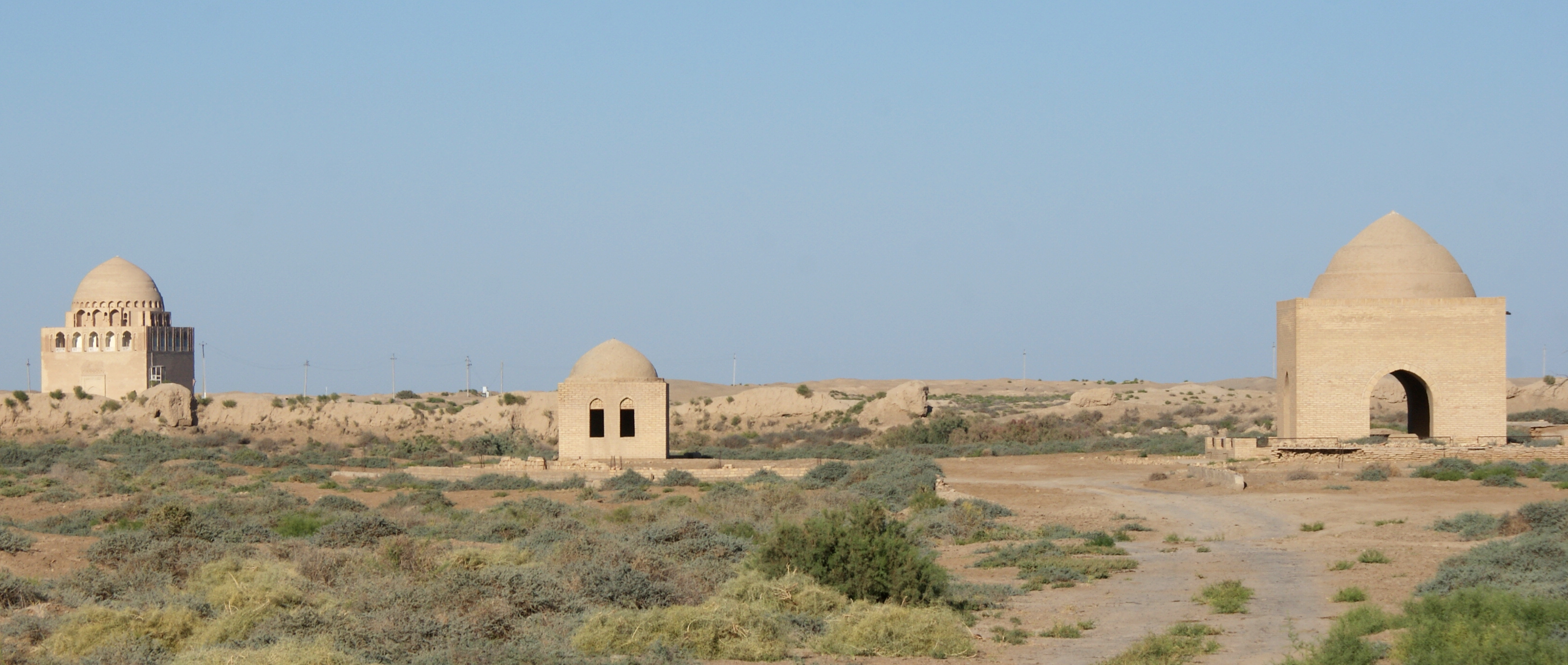
Kyz Bibi mausoleum complex

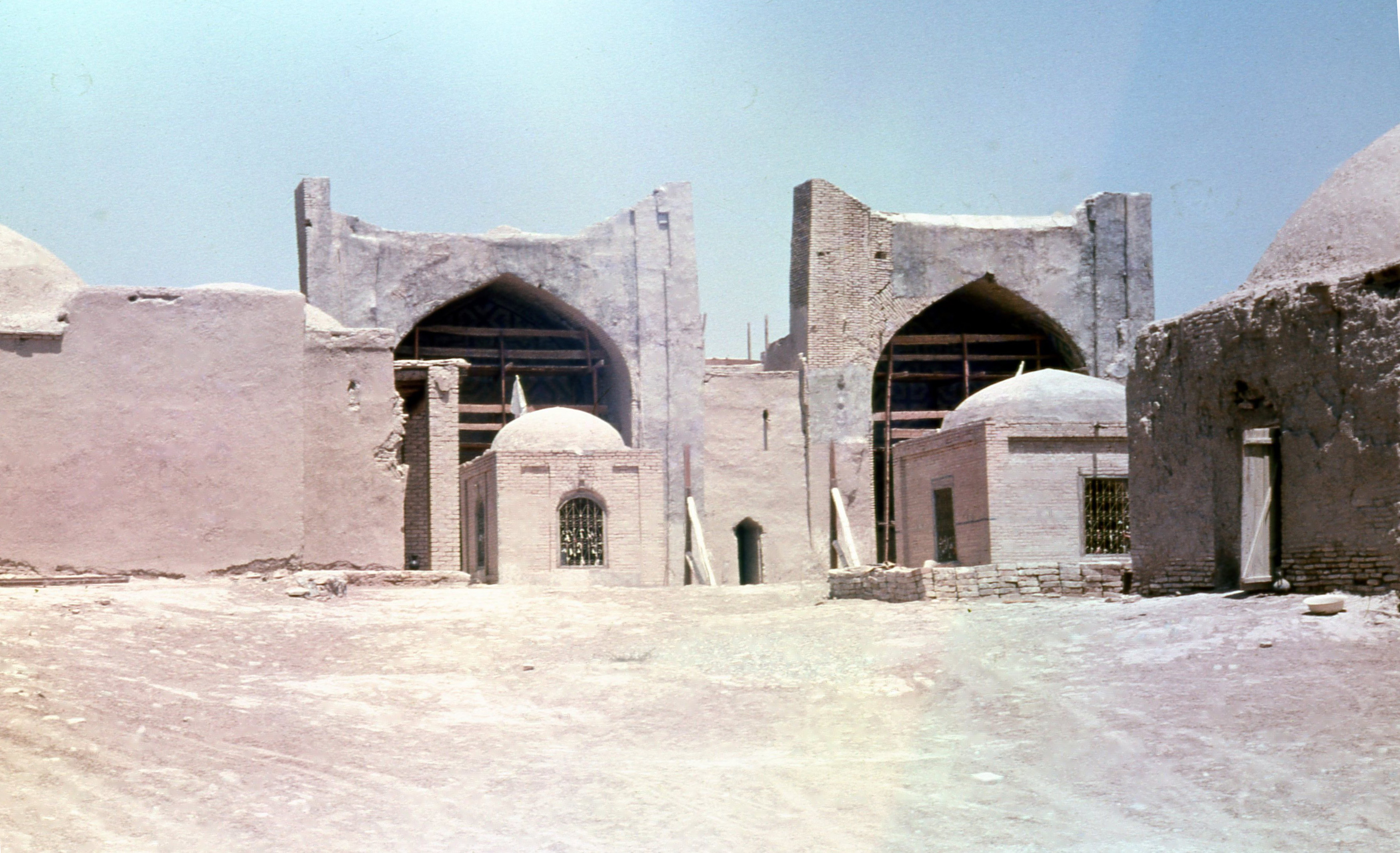
1981 photo of the tomb of the Eskhab brothers on the territory of ancient Merv

== See also ==
- Bayramali
- Greater Khorasan
- Nishapur
- Herat
- Balkh
- Gunar Tepe
- Margiana
- Mary, Turkmenistan
- The Mongol Invasion (trilogy)
- Murghab river
- List of World Heritage Sites in Turkmenistan
- Tahmuras, the mythical father and founder of Merv

== Notes ==
Preceded by Isfahan	Capital of Seljuq Empire (Persia) (Eastern capital); 1118–1153	Succeeded by Gurganj
