= Yohannan VI =

Patriarch of the Church of the East

Mar Yohannan VI
- Patriarch of the Church of the East
- Church: Church of the East
- See: Seleucia-Ctesiphon
- Installed: 1012
- Term ended: 1020
- Predecessor: Yohannan V
- Successor: Ishoyahb IV
- Other post: Bishop of Hirta

Personal details
- Born: Yohannan bar Nazuk
- Died: 1020
- Residence: Baghdad

Yohannan VI bar Nazuk was Patriarch of the Church of the East from 1012 until his death, which is given by various sources as being in 1016 or 1020.

== Life ==
Brief accounts of Yohannan's patriarchate are given in the Ecclesiastical Chronicle of the Jacobite writer Bar Hebraeus (fl. 1280) and in the ecclesiastical histories of the Nestorian writers Mari ibn Suleiman (twelfth-century), ʿAmr ibn Mattā (fourteenth-century) and Ṣalībā ibn Yūḥannā (fourteenth-century). The following account of Yohannan's patriarchate is given by Bar Hebraeus:

After the death of Yunanis a quarrel arose among the bishops over the appointment of his successor. After a long period of wrangling they drew lots for three candidates. The name of Yohannan bar Nazuk, bishop of Hirta, was drawn, and everybody agreed with this result. He was consecrated at Seleucia in the fifth month of the year 403 of the Arabs [AD 1012]. He prayed over the deposed bishops, restoring them to their dignity, and transferred others from one seat to another, not out of necessity but in return for bribes. He fulfilled his office for around eight years, and died on a Sunday, on the twenty-third day of tammuz [July] in the year 411 of the Arabs [AD 1020].

== See also ==
- List of patriarchs of the Church of the East

Church of the East titles
Preceded by Yohannan V (1000–1011)	Catholicos-Patriarch of the East (1012–1020)	Succeeded by Ishoʿyahb IV (1020–1025)
