= Dadarsi =

6th century BC Persian satrap and general

Dadarsi was a Persian general of Armenian origin and satrap of Bactria, who served under Persian king Darius I the Great (522–486 BCE). He was tasked with suppressing a revolt in Margiana.

== Sources ==
- Briant, Pierre (2002). From Cyrus to Alexander: A History of the Persian Empire. Eisenbrauns. pp. 1–1196. ISBN 9781575061207.
