= Mari of Seleucia-Ctesiphon =

Mari bar Toba was Patriarch of the Church of the East from 987 to 999.

== Sources ==
Brief accounts of Mari's patriarchate are given in the Ecclesiastical Chronicle of the Jacobite writer Bar Hebraeus (floruit 1280) and in the ecclesiastical histories of the Nestorian writers Mari (twelfth-century), ʿAmr (fourteenth-century) and Sliba (fourteenth-century). Modern assessments of his reign can be found in Jean-Maurice Fiey's Chrétiens syriaques sous les Abbassides and David Wilmshurst's The Martyred Church.

== Mari's patriarchate ==
The following account of Mari's patriarchate is given by Bar Hebraeus:

The catholicus ʿAbdishoʿ died after fulfilling his office for twenty-six years, on the second day of hziran [June] in the year 376 of the Arabs [AD 986], at the age of eighty-eight, after having consecrated one hundred and four bishops. At the order of the caliph he was succeeded by Mari bar Toba, a lawyer of Mosul, against the will of the bishops, who only wrote to give their consent after being beaten with rods. They consecrated him at Seleucia, according to custom, on the sixth Sunday of Lent in the year 377 of the Arabs [AD 987]. He read the gospel after his consecration, but did not expound it, and on the same day he celebrated the eucharist but did not station an attendant by the entrance to the altar, as his predecessors had done. He was the first to receive a firman from the caliph confirming his appointment. The practice caught on, and every catholicus thereafter was given a firman shortly after his consecration, or he was not considered to have been properly appointed. Mari was in very poor health, and had only an elementary knowledge of ecclesiastical functions and ceremonies, but he was an outstanding and experienced administrator, and was also noted for his charity and generosity. They say that when he first occupied the throne he found not a single zuze in the patriarchal treasury, but by working hard he was able to amass large sums of money, with which he bought several properties for the patriarchal seat (villas and that kind of thing) and added some spectacular buildings to the church and residence of the catholicus.

After the catholicus Mari had fulfilled his office for fourteen years, he died in the first month of the year 390 of the Arabs, that is to say on the twenty-eighth day of the former kanun [December] in the year 1311 of the Greeks [AD 999].

== See also ==
- List of patriarchs of the Church of the East

== Notes ==
Church of the East titles
| Preceded by ʿAbdishoʿ I (963–986) | Catholicos-Patriarch of the East (987–999) | Succeeded by Yohannan V (1000–1011) |
