= Barshabba =

East Syriac bishop of Merv

Barshabba, (Note: Also Bar Shabba, Barshaba, Bar Shaba, Barshabaa, Baršabbā, Bar Shebya, Bar Ŝewya, Mār Šābā or Mar Shabbay.) whose name means "son of the deportation", was the first recorded East Syriac bishop of Merv. He attended the synod of Patriarch Dadishoʿ in 424. Barshabba, or at least his name, lies at the root of an elaborate legend about the introduction of Christianity to eastern Iran and central Asia. (Note: Sims-Williams: "It is doubtful whether the legend of Baršabbā has any historical basis. . . and it is not unlikely that the legend is a pious fiction woven around his name as a result of local patriotism." But see Baum and Winkler: "As early as about 360, Merv, on the way to Central Asia in present-day Uzbekistan, may have been Christianized by Bishop Bar Shabba." And Andrade: "the narrative may have a meaningful historical kernel.")

The surviving versions of the legend of Barshabba are from no earlier than the 7th century. The only complete account of the legend is found in the Arabic Chronicle of Seʿert. An abbreviated Arabic version is in the Book of the Tower by Mārī ibn Sulaymān. These all derive from a Syriac original. Fragments of a Syriac version and 350 fragments of a Sogdian translation have been found in the East Syriac monastic complex of Bulayïq. He was venerated from eastern Iran to China, but no further west. He was venerated both in the Church of the East, with which the historical bishop was associated, and among the Melkites of central Asia. According to al-Bīrūnī, the Melkites of Khwarazm kept his feast on 21 June. (Note: In al-Bīrūnī's account, his name is misspelled Bršyʾ and his life mis-dated to "about two hundred years after Christ".) A Sogdian gospel lectionary attests to the celebration of his feast in the Church of the East in China. The martyrology of Rabban Ṣalība gives his feast as 20 August.

In the legend, Barshabba was a descendant of Christians deported by Shapur I (r. 240–270) from Roman Syria to Iran. He was raised a Christian in Ctesiphon. He exorcised and converted Shirran, (Note: Also Šīrrān, Šīrārān or perhaps Šīrzād (Shirzad); in the Syriac version, Šīr (Shir).) the sister or wife of Shapur II (r. 309–379), around the time of Shapur's peace treaty with Rome (363). To get her away from Barshabba's influence, Shapur sent Shirran to the oasis city of Merv and ordered her to marry the local marzban, Shirvan. From Merv she sent for Barshabba and he became its first bishop. Together they evangelised the city and region. He strove to convert the Magi, built churches and founded a school. He died and was buried, but by a miracle came back to life and lived another fifteen years before dying a final time. In the Sogdian version, he is credited with founding monasteries in Fars, Gorgan, Tus, Abarshahr, Sarakhs, Marw al-Rudh, Balkh, Herat and Sistan. The legend, combined with the evidence of the synod, would give Barshabba a pontificate of at least 69 years. The legend is consistent with the archaeological evidence for the introduction of Christianity to Merv in the 4th century.
