= Merv (East Syriac ecclesiastical province) =

Metropolitan province of the Church of the East

The Metropolitanate of Merv was an East Syriac metropolitan province of the Church of the East, between the fifth and eleventh centuries, with several known suffragan dioceses.

== Background ==
At least one East Syriac diocese in Khorasan existed by the beginning of the fifth century, though it was not assigned to a metropolitan province in 410. After establishing five metropolitan provinces in Mesopotamia, Canon XXI of the synod of Isaac provided that 'the bishops of the more remote dioceses of Fars, of the Islands, of Beth Madaye, of Beth Raziqaye and of the country of Abrashahr must accept the definition established in this council at a later date'. By implication, Abrashahr (Nishapur) already had a bishop at this period.

Four East Syriac dioceses in Khorasan and Segestan are attested a few years later. The bishops Bar Shaba of Merv, David of Abrashahr, Yazdoï of Herat and Aphrid of Segestan were present at the synod of Dadishoʿ in 424. The uncommon name of the bishop of Merv, Bar Shaba, means 'son of the deportation', suggesting that Merv's Christian community may have been deported from Roman territory.

The diocese of Segestan, whose bishop probably sat at Zarang, was disputed during the schism of Narsaï and Elishaʿ in the 520s. The patriarch Aba I resolved the dispute in 544 by temporarily dividing the diocese, assigning Zarang, Farah and Qash to the bishop Yazdaphrid and Bist and Rukut to the bishop Sargis. He ordered that the diocese should be reunited as soon as one of these bishops died.

The Christian population of the Merv region seems to have increased during the sixth century, as the bishop of Merv was recognised as a metropolitan at the synod of Joseph in 554 and Herat also became a metropolitan diocese shortly afterwards. The first known metropolitan of Herat was present at the synod of Ishoʿyahb I in 585. The growing importance of the Merv region for the Church of the East is also attested by the appearance of several more Christian centres during the late fifth and sixth century. By the end of the fifth century the diocese of Abrashahr (Nishapur) also included the city of Tus, whose name featured in 497 in the title of the bishop Yohannis of 'Tus and Abrashahr'. Four more dioceses seem also to have been created in the sixth century. The bishops Yohannan of 'Abiward and Shahr Peroz' and Theodore of Merw-i Rud accepted the acts of the synod of Joseph in 554, the latter by letter, while the bishops Habib of Pusang and Gabriel of 'Badisi and Qadistan' adhered by proxy to the decisions of the synod of Ishoʿyahb I in 585, sending deacons to represent them. None of these four dioceses is mentioned again, and it is not clear when they lapsed.

Timothy I consecrated a metropolitan named Hnanishoʿ for Sarbaz in the 790s. This diocese is not mentioned again. In 893 Eliya of Damascus listed both Merv and Herat as metropolitan provinces. Segestan was a suffragan diocese of Herat, while Merv had suffragan dioceses for 'Dair Hans', 'Damadut', and 'Daʿbar Sanaï', three districts whose locations are entirely unknown.

By the eleventh century East Syriac Christianity was in decline in Khorasan and Segestan but it was still an important community in parts of Central Asia. The last-known metropolitan of Merv was ʿAbdishoʿ, who was consecrated by the patriarch Mari (987–99). Around AD 1007, the Metropolitan Abdisho received a message from the Kerait Khan Teichili in Mongolia, delivered through Christian merchants who travelled and traded among nomadic communities in the region. Abdisho relayed this communication to the Patriarch in Baghdad, who subsequently dispatched clerics to the Keraites with the aim of converting them to Christianity.

The last known metropolitan of Herat was Giwargis, who flourished during the reign of Sabrishoʿ III (1064–1072). If any suffragan dioceses still existed at this time, they are not recorded in surviving sources. The Christian urban communities of Khorasan appear to have suffered severe disruption in the early thirteenth century, particularly when the cities of Merv, Nishapur, and Herat were captured by Genghis Khan in 1220.

Although these conquests were destructive, the Mongol regime was generally tolerant of other religions and granted tax exemptions to Christian clergy. Notably, many Keraites had already been incorporated into Mongol elite structures and military forces, and all Nestorian Christian churches were consequently exempted from taxation. It is known that at least one diocese survived into the thirteenth century. In 1279 an unnamed bishop of Tus entertained the monks Bar Sawma and Marqos in the monastery of Mar Sehyon near Tus during their pilgrimage from China to Jerusalem.

== The diocese of Merv ==
The bishop Barshabba ('son of the deportation') of Merv was among the signatories of the acts of the synod of Dadishoʿ in 424.

The bishop 'Pharumai', 'bishop of the town of Merv', was among the signatories of the acts of the synod of Acacius in 486.

The bishop Yohannan of Merv was among the signatories of the acts of the synod of Babaï in 497.

The bishop David, 'bishop, metropolitan of Merv', adhered by letter to the acts of the synod of Joseph in 554.

The priest Maraq was among the signatories of the acts of the synod of Ishoʿyahb I in 585, on behalf of the metropolitan Gregory of Merv.

The metropolitan Eliya of Merv was among the bishops present at the deathbed of the patriarch Ishoʿyahb III in 659.

The metropolitan ʿAbdishoʿ, formerly bishop of Ispahan, was appointed metropolitan of Merv by the patriarch Mari (987–99). He was metropolitan of Merv when Elijah of Nisibis completed his Chronography in 1018/19.

== The diocese of Herat ==
The bishop Yazdoï of Herat was among the signatories of the acts of the synod of Dadishoʿ in 424.

The bishop Yazdad of Herat adhered by letter to the acts of the synod of Babaï in 497.

The priest Daniel was among the signatories of the acts of the synod of Ishoʿyahb I in 585, on behalf of the metropolitan Gabriel of Herat.

The metropolitan Aristus of Herat was degraded during the patriarchate of Sliba-zkha (714–28) and replaced by Yohannan, who was himself degraded during the patriarchate of Pethion (731–40) and replaced by Panahishoʿ.

== The diocese of Segestan ==
The bishop Aphrid of Segestan was among the signatories of the acts of the synod of Dadishoʿ in 424.

In 540 the diocese of Segestan was disputed between two bishops, Yazdaphrid and Sargis, consecrated during the schism of Narsaï and Elishaʿ. The patriarch Mar Aba I, after taking evidence for both parties, resolved the dispute by temporarily dividing the diocese, placing Yazdaphrid in charge of 'the church of the Christians of Zarang, Farah and Qash' and Sargis over the churches of Bist and Rukut. He insisted that the diocese should be reunited after the death of one or other bishop.

The bishop Kurmah of Segestan was among the signatories of the acts of the synod of Ezekiel in 576.

The patriarch Sabrishoʿ III consecrated Giwargis of Kashkar a bishop shortly after his consecration in 1063/4 'and sent him to Khorasan and Segestan'. Giwargis then 'travelled on to the territory of the Khitan (al-Khita), where he remained until the end of his life'.

== The diocese of Tus and Abrashahr ==
The bishop David of Abrashahr was among the signatories of the acts of the synod of Dadishoʿ in 424.

The bishop Yohannis of Tus and Abrashahr was among the signatories of the acts of the synod of Babaï in 497.

An unnamed bishop of Tus entertained the monks Rabban Sawma and Marqos in the monastery of Mar Sehyon near Tus during their pilgrimage from China to Jerusalem in 1279.

== The diocese of Merw i-Rud ==
The bishop Theodore of Merw-i Rud adhered by letter to the acts of the synod of Joseph in 554.

== The diocese of Abiward and Shahr Piroz ==
The bishop Yohannan of 'Abiward and Shahr Piroz' was among the signatories of the acts of the synod of Joseph in 554.

== The diocese of Pusang ==
The deacon Elishaʿ was among the signatories of the acts of the synod of Ishoʿyahb I in 585, on behalf of the bishop Habib of Pusang.

== The diocese of Badisi and Qadistan ==
The deacon Sargis was among the signatories of the acts of the synod of Ishoʿyahb I in 585, on behalf of the bishop Gabriel of Badisi and Qadistan.
