= Nestorian Church, Famagusta =

Nestorian Church
- Church of Saint George the Exiler
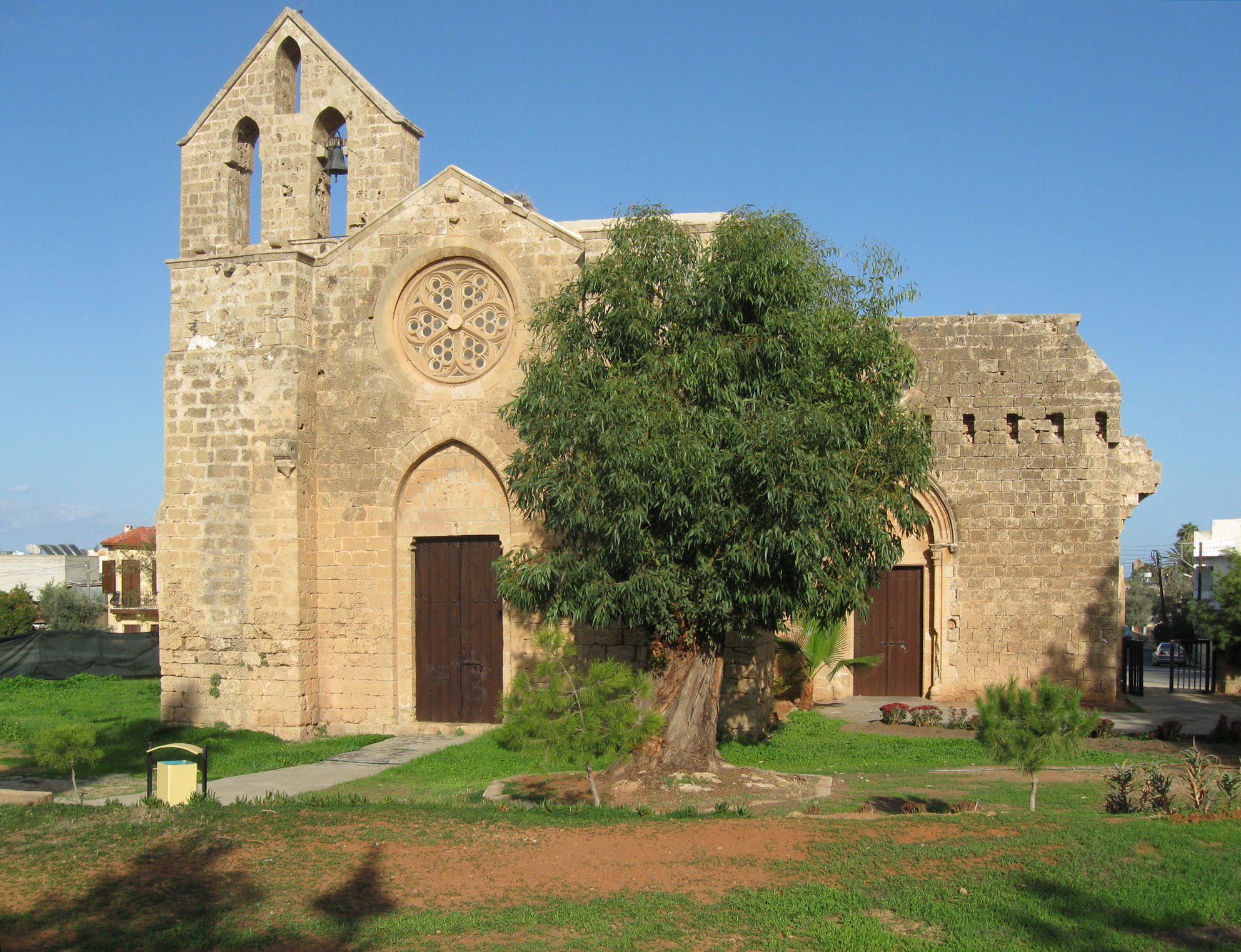
- Front façade of the Nestorian Church in 2008
- Nestorian Church
- 35.1253°N 33.9387°E
- Location: Famagusta
- Country: Northern Cyprus (de facto); Cyprus (de jure)
- Denomination: Greek Orthodox
- Previous denomination: Church of the East

History
- Former name: Mart Maryam
- Founded: 1360
- Founder: Lakhas brothers

Architecture
- Functional status: Used as a cultural center

The Nestorian Church (Turkish: Nasturi Kilisesi), officially known as the Church of St. George the Exiler (Greek: Ο Άγιος Γεώργιος ο Εξορινός; Turkish: Ay İkserino Kilisesi) is a church in the old town of Famagusta on the island of Cyprus. Founded in 1360, it was originally built as a church belonging to the Church of the East, an ancient Nestorian branch of Eastern Christianity, it was converted to a Greek Orthodox church in the British era after centuries of use as a stable for camels in the Ottoman era. It is one of the legendary "365 churches of Famagusta".

== Location ==
The church lies in the western areas of the old city of Famagusta within the walls. It is southeast of St. Anne's Church, in the area that was inhabited by Syriacs in the Lusignan era. Opposite the church stands the house built for the priest in the British period.

== History ==
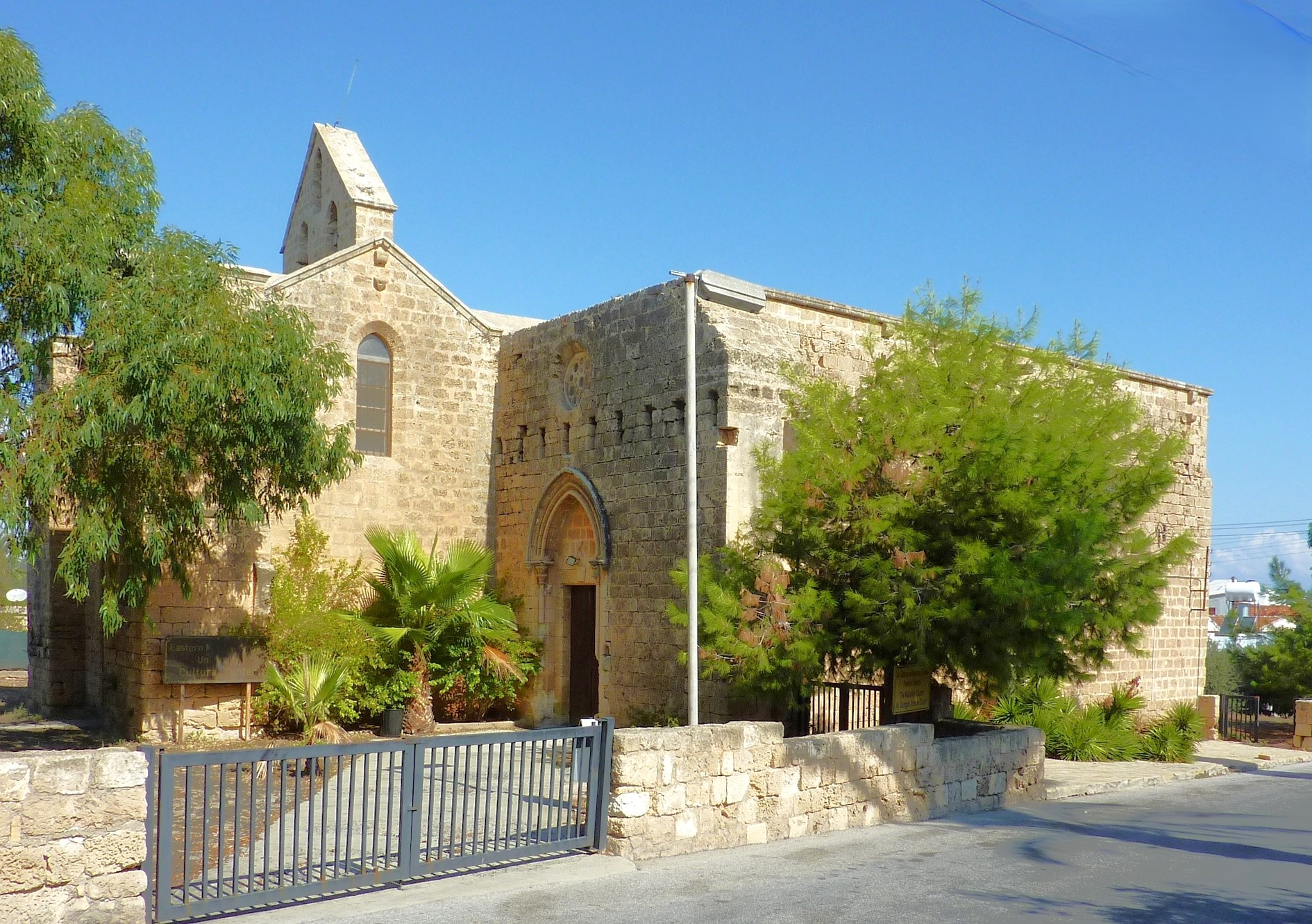
View of the church from a side

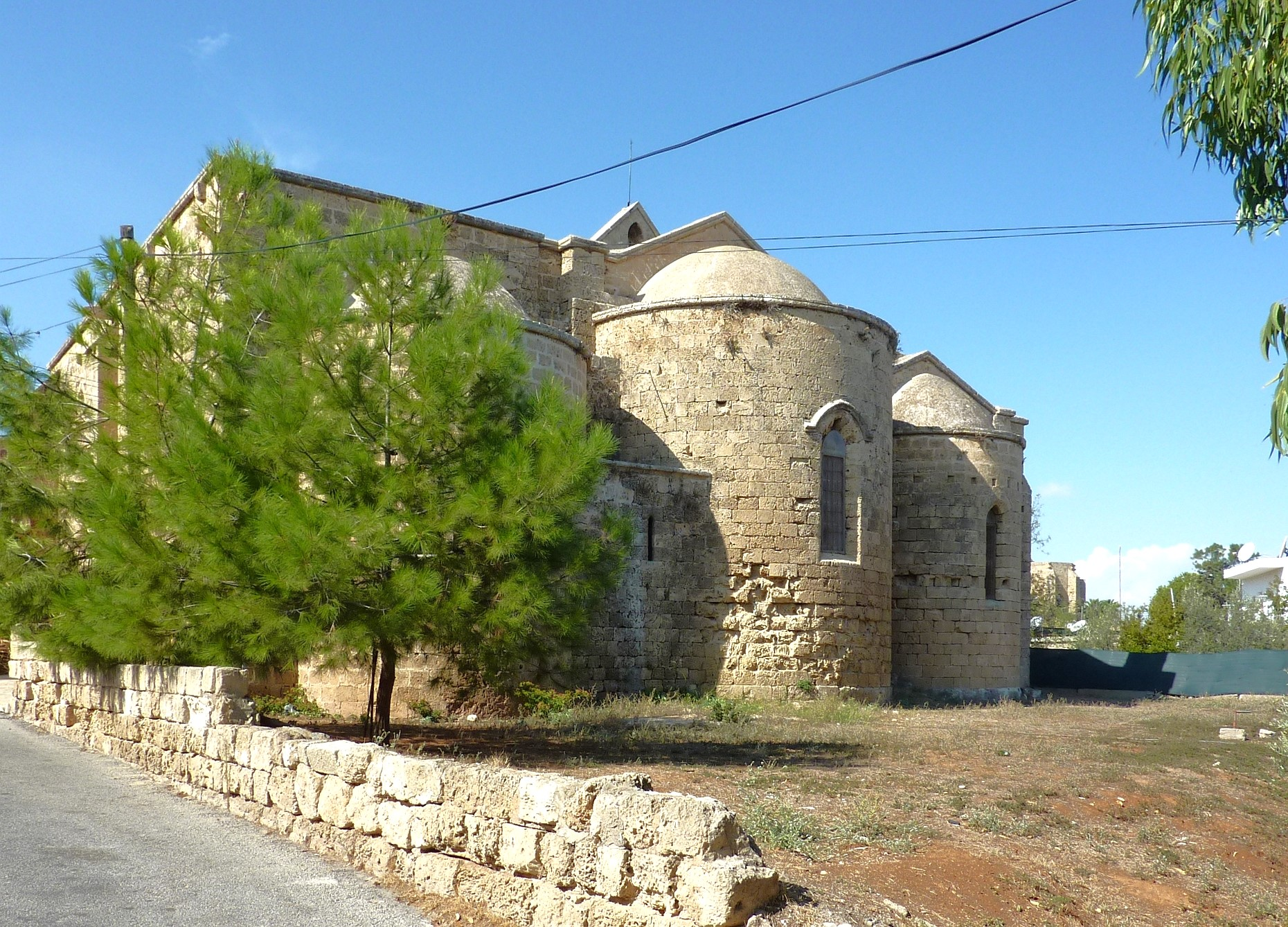
View of the church, showing the three apses

Chroniclers Leontios Machairas and Diomede Strambaldi wrote that the church had been built by the Lakhas brothers (also known as Lakhanopoulos) around 1360. These brothers were recorded as two Nestorian merchants, who were known for their immense wealth. The chroniclers pointed out the architecture and decorations of the building, reminiscent of the southern French and Italian Gothic churches of the time, hypothesizing that it may have been influenced by King Peter I's visit to Avignon in 1363. This version of the church's history represents the virtual consensus of scholars of medieval Famagusta, though scholar Michele Bacci has postulated a need to revise "name-identification and date of this church" as its architecture is reminiscent of the 12th–13th century Crusader architecture in Palestine and Syria. A historian of medieval Famagusta, Joseph Yacoub, has written that this must be the church mentioned as "Mart Maryam" in a 1581 letter written by the Nestorian Metropolite of Amid.

After the Ottoman capture of the city in 1571, the church was converted into a stable for camels, with worship being allowed only on the Feast of "St. George the Exiler". In 1905, the British administration handed the church to the Greek Cypriots, who used it as their parish church. This was organized by Michalakis Loizides, who persuaded the British administrators to give permission with the help of some Turkish Cypriot friends and got free wood for doors and windows from contractors in the Port of Famagusta. He then got the priest of the nearby village of Kontea to serve at the church. By the 1930s, many of the frescoes that were observed in 1899 had disappeared. Upon the takeover by Greek Cypriots, the southern part of the church was repaired. Between 1937 and 1939, the rubble in the northern part was removed, and an excavation was carried out; the road to the west was also lowered to its level when the church was built. In 1947, further repairs were carried out. During the intercommunal violence of 1963–1964, Greek Cypriots left the fortified old town of Famagusta, and the church was used to house Turkish Cypriot refugees until 1974. This may have inflicted further damage upon the frescoes. Since 1989, it has been used by the Eastern Mediterranean University as a cultural centre.

On 19 April 2014, a Great Friday liturgy, the first service in the church since 1956, was carried out by Greek Cypriots. The service was attended by around 3,000 people, including the former President of Cyprus, George Vassiliou. As of January 2015, the church was reportedly in disrepair.

== Architecture ==
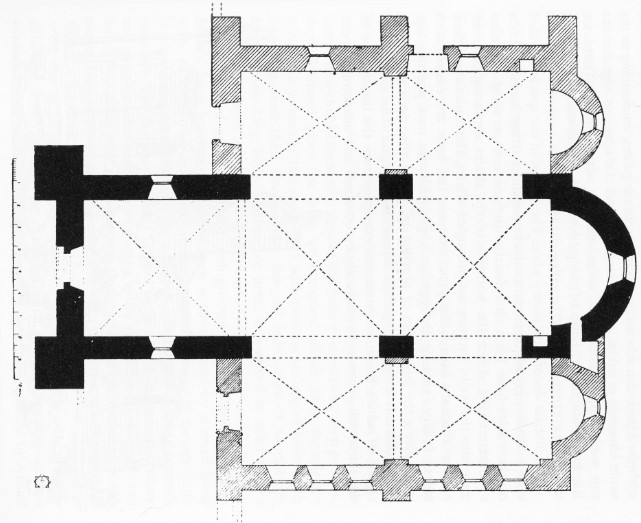
Plan of the Nestorian Church by Camille Enlart

The church walls are made of ashlar and has three naves and three apses. All three naves have entrances to their west. Originally, the church was built with a single nave and a protruding apse; the other two naves and two minor apses were added at a later date. During this transformation, the eastern and central bays were demolished to be replaced by arcades supported by square pillars. The western bay, according to Bacci, was turned into "a kind of narthex or vestibule". The older façade of the building is plainer, with a round window and a plain portal, while the portal of the southern nave, added later, is adorned with an oeil-de-boeuf and marble mouldings.

The church is home to numerous frescoes dated to the 14th and 15th centuries. Unlike Byzantine Orthodox churches, the frescoes in the Nestorian Church are not part of a unified design, which is characteristic of Nestorian churches. Many of the frescoes were painted in different periods by different artists. The apse may have had a unified design, but this is impossible to determine given the level of damage to the frescoes.

The church was, as of June 2013, the only one in Famagusta to have a bell, and one of the best preserved ones in its state from medieval times due to the lack of use.

== Bibliography ==
- Uluca, Ege (2006), Gazimağusa Kaleiçi'nin Tarihsel Süreç İçindeki Kentsel Gelişimi ve Değişimi (PhD thesis) (in Turkish), Istanbul Technical University
- Bacci, Michele (2006), Syrian, Palaiologan, and Gothic Murals in the"Nestorian" Church of Famagusta, Proceedings of the Christian Archaeological Society, pp. 207–220
