= Mar Shimun =

Mar Shimun may refer to any of the following Patriarchs of the Church of the East:

- Shemon Bar Sabbae, (c. 329–c. 341), Church of the East
- Shimun II (1365–1392), Church of the East
- Shimun III (1403–1407), Church of the East
- Shimun IV (1437–1497), Church of the East
- Shimun V (1497–1501), Church of the East
- Shimun VI (1503–1538), Church of the East
- Shemon VII Ishoyahb (1538–1551), Church of the East
- Shimun VIII Yohannan Sulaqa (1553–1555), first Patriarch of the Chaldean Catholic Church
- Shimun IX Dinkha (1580–1600), Patriarch of the Chaldean Catholic Church
- Shimun X Eliyah (1600–1638)
- Shimun XI Eshuyow (1638–1656)
- Shimun XII Yoalaha (1656–1662)
- Shimun XIII Dinkha (1662) 1681–1700, Patriarch who broke the Communion with Rome. Successors became leaders of the Assyrian Church of the East
- Shimun XIV Shlemon (1700–1740), Assyrian Church of the East
- Shimun XV Maqdassi Mikhail (1740–1780), Assyrian Church of the East
- Shimun XVI Yohannan (1780–1820), Assyrian Church of the East
- Shimun XVII Abraham (1820–1860), Assyrian Church of the East
- Shimun XVIII Rubil (1860–1903), Assyrian Church of the East
- Shimun XIX Benyamin (1903–1918), Assyrian Church of the East (assassinated)
- Shimun XX Paulos (1918–1920), Assyrian Church of the East
- Shimun XXI Eshai (1920–1975) (assassinated), Assyrian Church of the East

== See also ==
- List of patriarchs of the Church of the East
- List of Chaldean Catholic Patriarchs of Babylon
