= Shimun XV Maqdassi Mikhail =

Mar Shimun XIV Shlemon
- Catholicos-Patriarch of the Church of the East
- Church: Church of the East (modern Assyrian Church of the East)
- Diocese: Patriarchal Diocese of Qodshanis
- See: Holy Apostolic See of Seleucia-Ctesiphon
- Installed: 1740
- Term ended: 1780
- Predecessor: Shimun XIV Shlemon
- Successor: Shimun XVI Yohannan

Orders
- Rank: Catholicos-Patriarch

Personal details
- Born: Qodshanis, Hakkari, Ottoman Empire
- Died: 1780 Qodshanis, Hakkari, Ottoman Empire
- Denomination: Eastern Christian, Church of the East
- Residence: Qodshanis, Hakkari, Ottoman Empire

Mar Shimun XV Maqdassi Mikhail was the Catholicos-Patriarch of the Church of the East of the Shem'on line (based in Qodshanis) that would eventually become known as the Assyrian Church of the East from 1740 until 1780.

== Sources ==
- Burleson, Samuel; Rompay, Lucas van (2011). "List of Patriarchs of the Main Syriac Churches in the Middle East". Gorgias Encyclopedic Dictionary of the Syriac Heritage. Piscataway, NJ: Gorgias Press. pp. 481–491.
- Murre van den Berg, Heleen H. L. (1999a). "The Patriarchs of the Church of the East from the Fifteenth to Eighteenth Centuries" (PDF). Hugoye: Journal of Syriac Studies. 2 (2): 235–264. doi:10.31826/hug-2010-020119.
- Wilmshurst, David (2000). The Ecclesiastical Organisation of the Church of the East, 1318–1913. Louvain: Peeters Publishers. ISBN 978-90-429-0876-5.
- Wilmshurst, David (2019). "The Patriarchs of the Church of the East". The Syriac World. London: Routledge. pp. 799–805. ISBN 978-1-138-89901-8.

Assyrian Church of the East titles
| Preceded by Shimun XIV Shlemon | Patriarch of the Church of the East; Shem'on line (Qodshanis); 1740 – 1780 | Succeeded by Shimun XVI Yohannan |
