= Assyrian Church of the East =

Eastern Christian denomination

Holy Apostolic Catholic Assyrian Church of the East
- ܥܕܬܐ ܕܡܕܢܚܐ ܕܐܬܘܖ̈ܝܐ
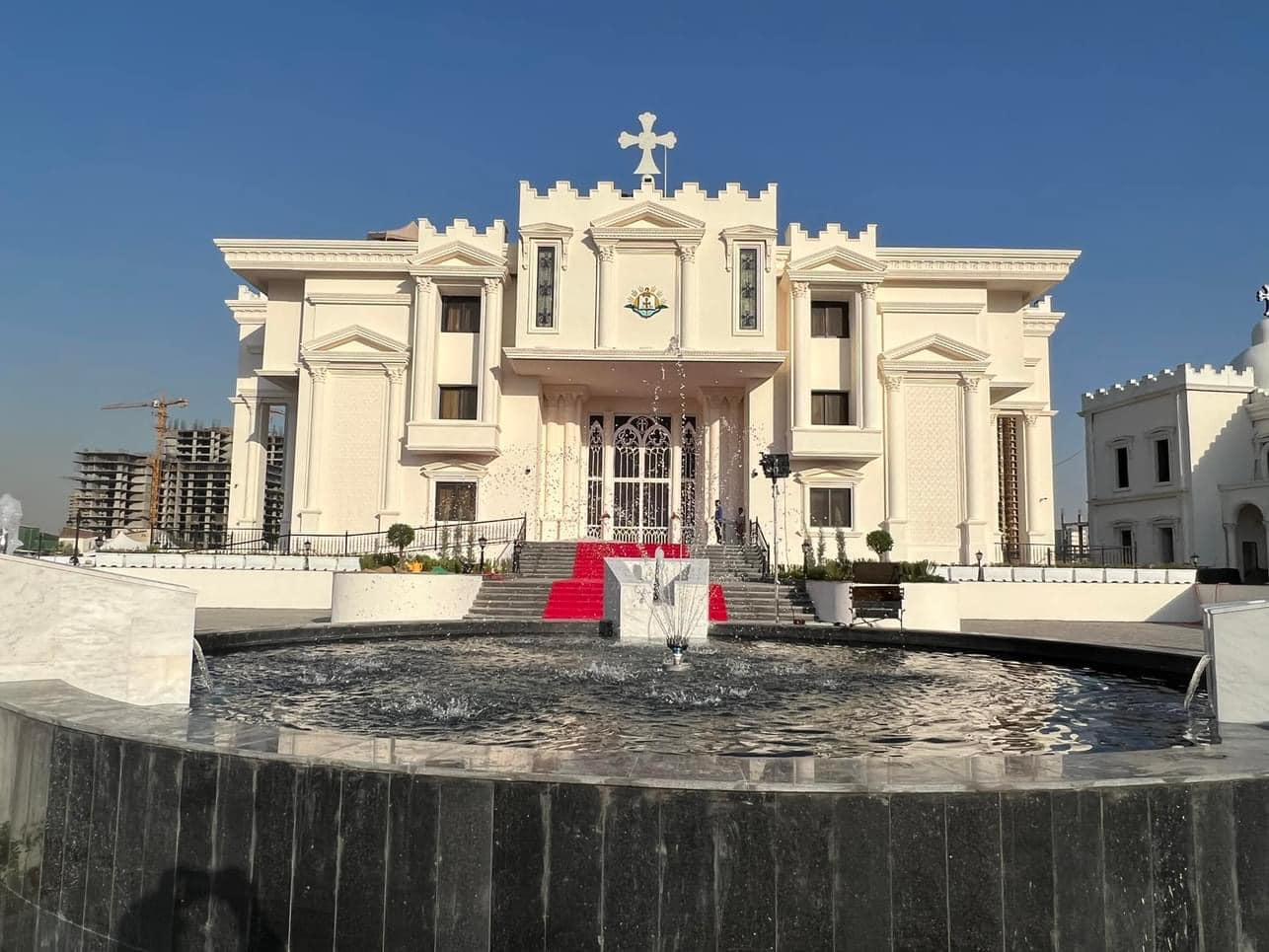
- The Patriarchal See of the Assyrian Church of the East in Kurdistan Region, Iraq
- Abbreviation: ACOE
- Classification: Christian
- Orientation: Syriac
- Theology: East Syriac theology (Note: Dyophysite doctrine of Theodore of Mopsuestia (Note: Distinguished from Chalcedonian Dyophysitism.) (Note: The justice of imputing Nestorianism to Nestorius, whom the Assyrian Church of the East venerated as a saint, is disputed. David Wilmshurst states that for centuries "the word 'Nestorian' was used both as a term of abuse by those who disapproved of the traditional East Syrian theology, as a term of pride by many of its defenders [...] and as a neutral and convenient descriptive term by others. Nowadays it is generally felt that the term carries a stigma". Sebastian P. Brock says: "The association between the Church of the East and Nestorius is of a very tenuous nature, and to continue to call that Church 'Nestorian' is, from a historical point of view, totally misleading and incorrect – quite apart from being highly offensive and a breach of ecumenical good manners". Apart from its religious meaning, the word "Nestorian" has also been used in an ethnic sense, as shown by the phrase "Catholic Nestorians". In light of the persistently misused 'Nestorian' term, Sebastian Brock, a Fellow of the British Academy, in his 1996 article titled: "The 'Nestorian' Church: a lamentable misnomer", called the designation for the Church of the East as the "'Nestorian Church'" as "both inappropriate and misleading", quoted in the larger context: "...the term 'Nestorian Church' has become the standard designation for the ancient oriental church which in the past called itself 'The Church of the East', but which today prefers the fuller title 'The Assyrian Church of the East'. Such a designation is not only discourteous to modern members of this venerable church, but also – as this paper aims to show – both inappropriate and misleading.") (Note: In 1994, the Common Christological Declaration between the Catholic Church and the Assyrian Church of the East marked the resolution of a dispute between those two Churches that had existed since the Council of Ephesus. They expressed their common understanding of doctrine concerning the divinity and humanity of Christ, and recognized the legitimacy and rightness of their respective descriptions of Mary as, on the Assyrian side, "the Mother of Christ our God and Saviour", and, on the Catholic side, as "the Mother of God" and also as "the Mother of Christ".))
- Catholicos-Patriarch: Awa III
- Region: Central Middle East, India; diaspora
- Language: Syriac, Aramaic, Suret
- Liturgy: East Syriac Rite
- Headquarters: Ankawa, Erbil, Iraq
- Founder: Jesus Christ; Thomas the Apostle; (sacred tradition)
- Absorbed: Chaldean Syrian Church (1999)
- Separations: Ancient Church of the East (1968)
- Members: 413,000 - 500,000+
- Official website: Official website

The Assyrian Church of the East (Note: Classical Syriac: ܥܕܬܐ ܕܡܕܢܚܐ ܕܐܬܘܖ̈ܝܐ, romanized: ʿĒḏtā ḏ-Maḏnḥā ḏ-ʾĀṯūrāyē; Arabic: كنيسة المشرق الآشورية) (ACOE), sometimes called the Church of the East and officially known as the Holy Apostolic Catholic Assyrian Church of the East, (Note: Classical Syriac: ܥܕܬܐ ܩܕܝܫܬܐ ܘܫܠܝܚܝܬܐ ܩܬܘܠܝܩܝ ܕܡܕܢܚܐ ܕܐܬܘܪ̈ܝܐ, romanized: ʿĒḏtā Qaddīštā wa-Šlīḥāytā Qāṯōlīqī ḏ-Maḏnḥā ḏ-ʾĀṯūrāyē; Arabic: كنيسة المشرق الآشورية الرسولية الجاثلقية المقدسة) is an East Syriac Christian church that follows and descends from the theology and ecclesiology of the historic Church of the East. It follows the eastern rite of Syriac Christianity, and employs the Divine Liturgy of Saints Addai and Mari. Its main liturgical language is Syriac, a dialect of Eastern Aramaic.

The Assyrian Church of the East has a traditional episcopal structure, headed by the catholicos-patriarch headquartered in Erbil, Iraq. The current catholicos-patriarch of the Assyrian Church of the East, Mar Awa III, was consecrated in September 2021. Its hierarchy is composed of metropolitan bishops and diocesan bishops, while lower clergy consists of priests and deacons, who serve in dioceses (eparchies) and parishes throughout West Asia, India, North America, Australia, and Europe (including the Caucasus and Russia).

The Assyrian Church of the East is one the major splinter branches descended from the historic Church of the East, and is not in communion with the Catholic, Oriental Orthodox, or Eastern Orthodox churches. (Note: The Assyrian Church of the East allows open communion with all baptised Christians, regardless of their denomination or church. However, this open communion is not mutual with the Roman Catholic, Eastern Orthodox or Oriental Orthodox churches.) The current Assyrian Church of the East split in 1672 from the Chaldean Catholic Church, a faction of the Church of the East that had come into full communion with the Holy See and whose members were also mostly ethnic Assyrians.

The Assyrian Church of the East has a characteristic Christology that was formulated by Babai the Great. It has historically been identified by Chalcedonian churches as Nestorian, but it has clarified that it does not maintain the Christological doctrines that this label refers to, despite its veneration of Nestorius as a saint and Church Father. After the Common Christological Declaration in 1994 between the Church of the East and the Catholic Church, and a 2001 theological dialogue between the churches, guidelines for the faithful to receive mutual admission to the Eucharist between the Chaldean Catholic Church and the Assyrian Church of the East were established in particular circumstances.

The Assyrians Church of East differs from the Catholic, Eastern Orthodox, and Oriental Orthodox churches in that it uses a unique form of the biblical canon, known as the Syriac Peshitta. Originally written in the Syriac dialect of the Aramaic language, It includes the traditional 46-book Old Testament, including the deuterocanon, but only uses 22 books in the New Testament. The Assyrian Church rejects as canonical the books of 2 Peter, 2 John, 3 John, Jude and Revelation, though some Peshitta Bibles still include the books as a matter of convenience.

Officially known as the Church of the East until 1976, it was then renamed the Assyrian Church of the East. It continued the 14th-century practice of a hereditary succession from uncle to nephew to the patriarchate until 1975, with the murder of Shimun XXI Eshai in San Jose, California. As of 2020, according to the World Christian Encyclopedia, published by Edinburgh University Press, the Assyrian Church of the East has an estimated 413,000 members.

== History ==
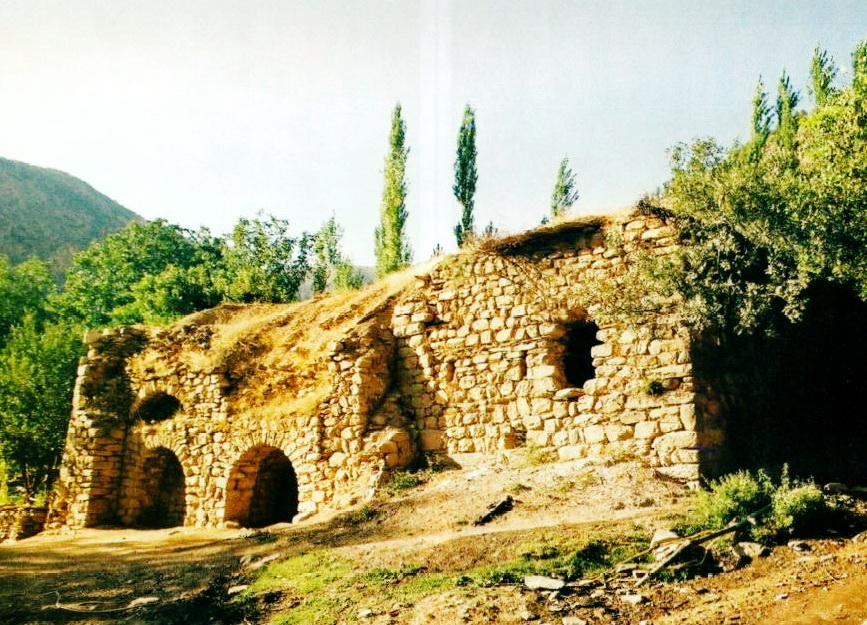
A 6th-century Assyrian church, St. John the Arab, in the Assyrian village of Geramon

The Assyrian Church of the East considers itself as the continuation of the Church of the East, a church that originally developed among the Assyrians during the first century AD in Assyria, Upper Mesopotamia and northwestern Persia, east of the Byzantine Empire. It is an apostolic church established by Thomas the Apostle, Addai of Edessa, and Bartholomew the Apostle.

The distinction between the Assyrian Church of the East and the Chaldean Catholic Church resulted from the series of complex processes and events that occurred within the Church of the East during the transitional period that started in the middle of the 16th century, and lasted until the beginning of the 19th century. That turbulent period was marked by several consequent splits and mergers, resulting in the creation of separate branches and rival patriarchal lines. During the entire period, one of the main questions of dispute was the union with the Catholic Church. Ultimately, the pro-Catholic branches were consolidated as the Chaldean Catholic Church, while the traditional branches were consolidated as the Assyrian Church of the East.

=== Schisms and branches ===
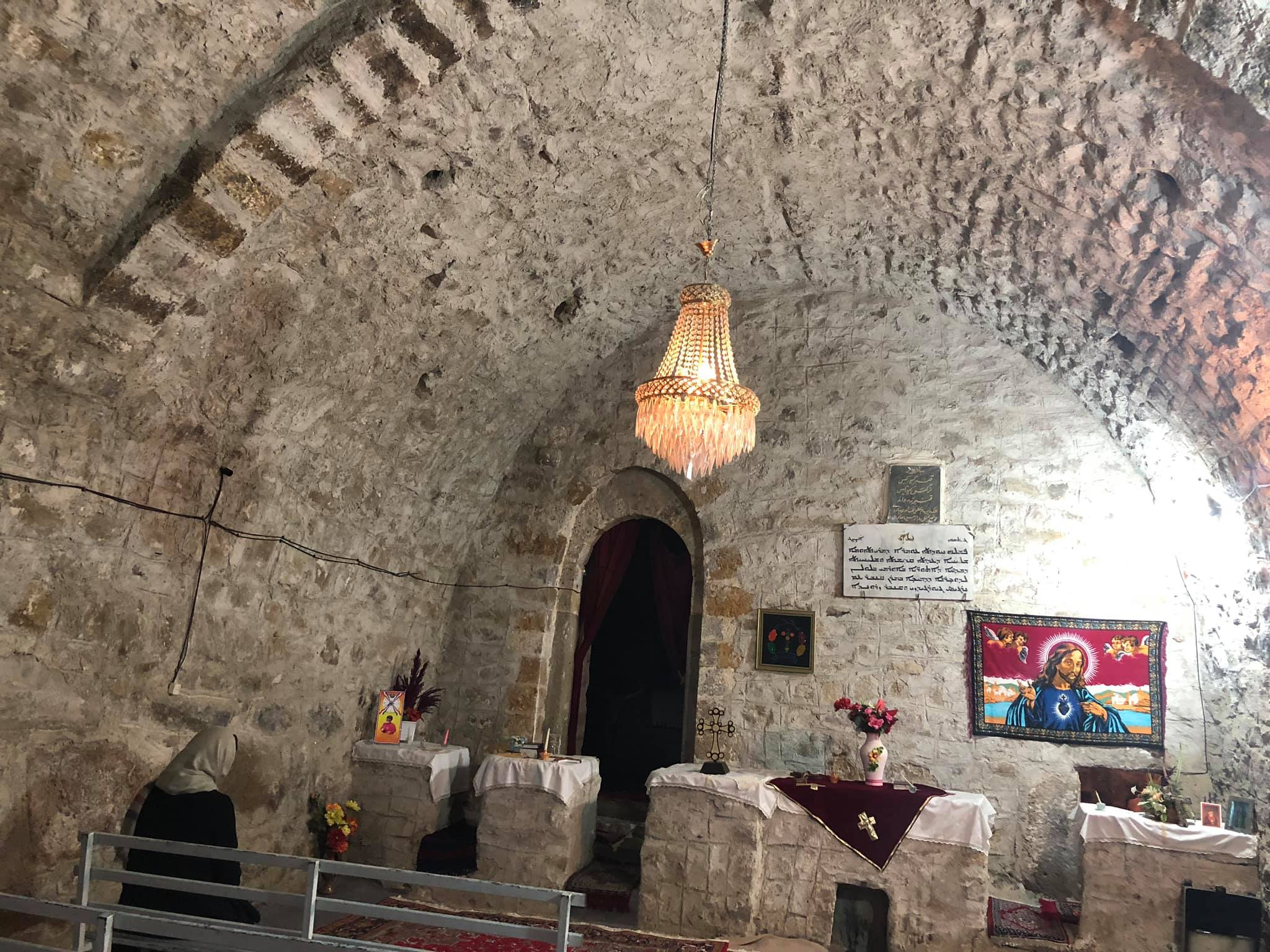
Mar Toma church near Urmia, Iran

During the patriarchal tenure of Shemon VII Ishoyahb (1539–1558), who resided in the ancient Rabban Hormizd Monastery near Alqosh, an internal dissent occurred over several issues, including the question of hereditary succession to the patriarchal throne, and the question of union with the Catholic Church. By that time, Franciscan missionaries had already gained some influence over several local communities, and they took an active role in organizing the opposition to the patriarch at that time. By the end of 1552, a pro-Catholic party had been organized in Mosul under the leadership of the priest Yohannan Sulaqa, who decided to legitimize his position by traveling to Rome and seeking confirmation by Pope Julius III (1550–1555).

Receiving support from the Franciscan missionaries, he arrived in Rome and entered into full communion with the Catholic Church in February 1553. At that point, officials of the Roman Curia were given incorrect information that the elderly Patriarch Shemon VII had actually died. After some deliberation, the Roman pope decided to appoint Yohannan Sulaqa as "Patriarch of Babylon" and named the breakaway church as 'The Church of Assyria and Mosul" in April 1553.

Upon consecration, Yohannan Sulaqa took the name Shimun and by the end of the year he returned to his homeland. He started to organize the pro-Catholic party by appointing several metropolitans and bishops.

=== The senior Eliya line of Alqosh ===
Union with Rome was actively opposed by Patriarch Shemon VII Ishoyahb, who continued to reside in the Rabban Hormizd Monastery near the ancient Assyrian town of Alqosh. He was succeeded by his nephew Eliya (1558–1591), who was designated as Eliya "VII" in older historiography, but renumbered as Eliya "VI" in recent scholarly works. The same renumbering was applied to his successors, who all took the same name thus creating the Eliya line. During his patriarchal rule, the Eliya line preserved its traditional christology and full ecclesiastical independence. His successor was Patriarch Eliya VII (VIII) (1591–1617), who negotiated on several occasions with the Catholic Church, in 1605 and 1610, and again in 1615–1616, but without any conclusion. Further negotiations were abandoned by the next Patriarch Eliya VIII (IX) (1617–1660). David Wilmshurst noted that his successor, Patriarch Eliya IX (X) (1660–1700) also was a "vigorous defender of the traditional faith".

The Eliya line of traditionalist patriarchs continued throughout the entire 18th century, residing in the ancient Monastery of Rabban Hormizd, which was eventually attacked and looted by muslim Turks in 1743, at the beginning of the Ottoman–Persian War (1743–1746). Faced with a centuries-old rivalry and frequent conflicts between two mighty Islamic empires (Ottoman and Persian), all Christian communities in the bordering regions were constantly exposed to danger – and not only in the times of war, since local, mainly Kurdish, warlords were accustomed to attacking Assyrian and Armenian Christian communities and monasteries and taking their land, often with Ottoman support. Patriarchs Eliya X (XI) (1700–1722) and Eliya XI (XII) (1722–1778) tried to improve the increasingly worsening position of their Christian flock by staying loyal to Ottoman authorities, but the local administration was frequently unable to provide effective

protection. The Eliya line of traditionalist patriarchs ended in 1804 with the death of Eliya XII (XIII) (1778–1804).

=== The junior Shimun line of Qochanis ===
During the second half of the 16th century, traditionalist patriarchs of the Eliya line were faced with the continuous presence of the pro-Catholic movement, led by successors of Shimun VIII Yohannan Sulaqa. After his death in 1555, the newly established line of patriarchs who were united with the Catholic Church was continued by Abdisho IV Maron (1555–1570), who remained in full communion with the Catholic Church. He visited Rome and was officially confirmed by the Pope of Rome in 1562. Soon after his death, connections with Rome were weakened for the first time during the tenure of Patriarch Yahballaha IV who did not seek confirmation from the pope. That interlude was ended by his successor Shimun IX Dinkha (1580–1600) who restored full communion with the Catholic Church, and was officially confirmed by the Pope of Rome in 1584.

After his death, the patriarchal office was made hereditary, and patriarchs of this line continued to use the name Shimun, thus creating the Shimun line. Hereditary succession was not acceptable to Rome, and during the tenure of the next Patriarch Shimun X Eliyah (1600–1638) ties with the Catholic Church were loosened again. In 1616, Shimun X signed a traditional profession of faith that was not accepted by the Roman pope, leaving the patriarch without Rome's confirmation. His successor Shimun XI Eshuyow (1638–1656) restored communion with the Catholic Church as late as 1653, eventually receiving confirmation from the pope. By that time, the movement towards full commitment to the traditional faith was constantly growing stronger within the Shimun line. When the next Patriarch Shimun XII Yoalaha decided to send his profession of faith to the pope, he was deposed by his bishops because of his pro-Catholic attitude. The pope tried to intervene on his behalf, but without success.

Final resolution of conflicts within the Shimun line occurred under the next Patriarch Shimun XIII Dinkha (1662–1700), who definitively broke communion with the Catholic Church. In 1670, he gave a traditionalist reply to an approach that was made from the Roman pope, and by 1672 all connections with the Catholic Church were terminated. At the same time, Patriarch Shimun XIII moved his seat from Amid to Qochanis. After the final return to the traditional faith, patriarchs of the Shimun line decided to keep their independence and after that time there were two independent lines of traditional patriarchs: the senior Eliya line in Alqosh and the junior Shimun line in Qochanis.

Such division was additionally caused by the complex structure of local Assyrian communities, traditionally organized as tribal confederations with each tribe being headed by a local lord (malik), while each malik was ultimately subject to the patriarch, who mediated between Christian Assyrians and the Ottoman authorities.

=== Consolidation of remaining branches ===
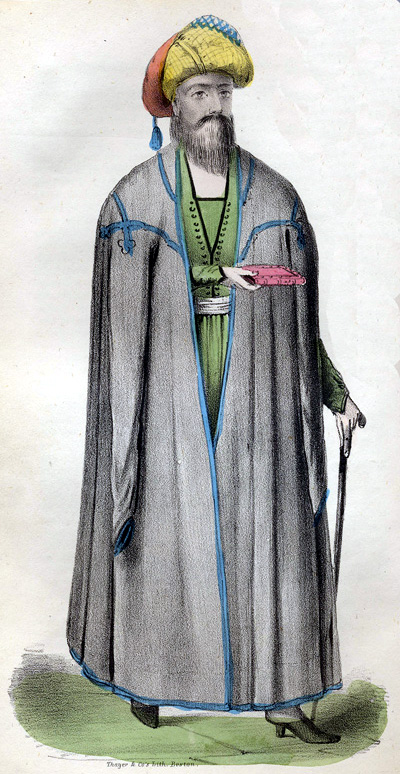
Mar Elias (Eliya), the Nestorian bishop of the Urmia Plain village of Geogtapa, c. 1831. The image comes from A Residence of Eight Years in Persia Among the Nestorians, with Notes of the Mohammedans by Justin Perkins (Andover, 1843).

In 1780, at the beginning of the patriarchal tenure of Eliya XII (XIII) (1778–1804), a group seceded from the Eliya line in Alqosh and elected Yohannan Hormizd, who entered full communion with the Catholic Church and was officially appointed Archbishop of Mosul and patriarchal administrator of the Chaldean Catholic Church, in 1783. Only after the death in 1827 of the last representative of the Josephite line, Joseph V Augustine Hindi, was Yohannan recognized as the Chaldean Catholic patriarch by the pope, in 1830. By this official appointment, the final merger of various factions committed to the union with the Catholic Church was achieved, thus forming the modern Chaldean Catholic Church.

At the same time, the long coexistence and rivalry between two traditionalist patriarchal branches — the senior Eliya line of Alqosh and the junior Shimun line of Qochanis — ended in 1804 when the last primate of the Eliya line, Patriarch Eliya XII (XIII) died and was buried in the ancient Rabban Hormizd Monastery. His branch decided not to elect a new patriarch, thus enabling the remaining patriarch Shimun XVI Yohannan (1780–1820) of the Shimun line to become the sole primate of both Assyrian traditionalist branches. Consolidated after 1804, the reunited traditionalist church led by patriarchs of the Shimun line became widely known as the "Assyrian Church of the East". Still based in Qodchanis, Assyrian Patriarch Shimun XVI Yohannan was not able to secure control over the traditional seat of the former Eliya line in the ancient Rabban Hormizd Monastery; and around 1808 that venerated monastic institution passed to the Chaldean Catholics.

The next Assyrian Patriarch Shimun XVII Abraham (1820–1861) also governed his church from Qodshanis. During years marked by political turbulence, he tried to maintain good relations with the local Ottoman authorities. In 1843, he was faced with renewed hostilities from Kurdish warlords, who attacked and looted many Christian villages, killing 10,000 Christian men and taking away women and children as captives. The patriarch himself was forced to take temporary refuge in Mosul. He was succeeded by Patriarch Shimun XVIII Rubil (1861–1903) who also resided in Qodshanis. In 1869, he received an open invitation from the Vatican to visit Rome to attend the First Vatican Council as an observer, but he did not accept the invitation, In following years, he also rejected other initiatives for union with the Catholic Church.

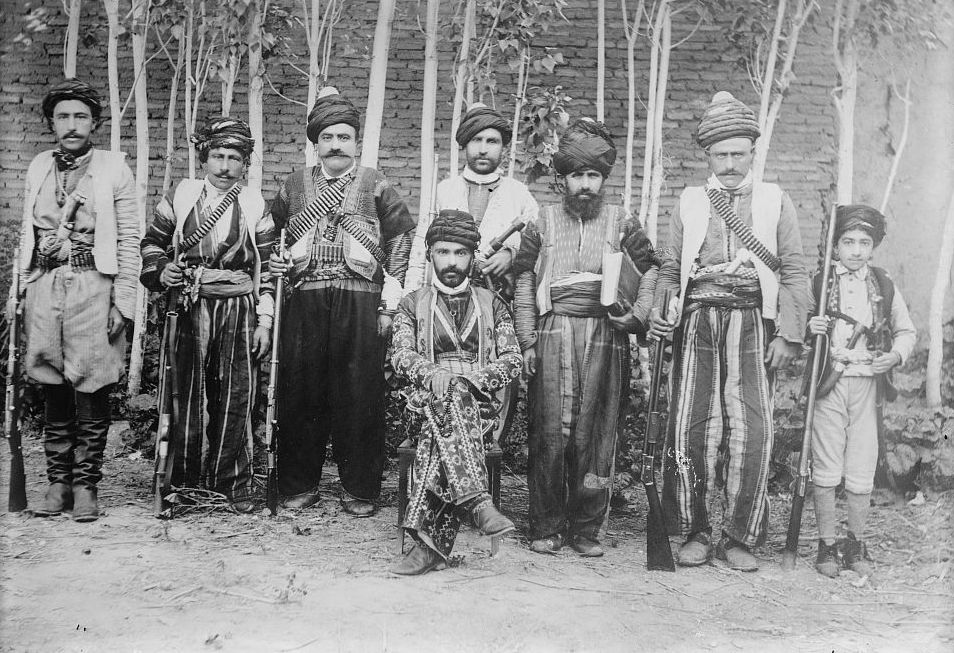
Early 20th century Assyrian archbishop and servants

By the end of the 19th century, the Assyrian Church of the East consolidated itself as the sole representative of all traditionalist Assyrians. It also managed to secure a certain level of autonomy within the highly complex system of Ottoman local governance in the bordering regions. On several occasions, Assyrian patriarchs refused to enter communion with the Catholic Church or merge with the Chaldean Catholic Church. On the other hand, by the end of the 19th century some of its communities were converted to Protestantism by various western missionaries, while other communities were drawn to Eastern Orthodoxy. That movement was led by Assyrian Bishop Mar Yonan of Supurghan in the region of Urmia who converted to Eastern Orthodoxy in 1898, through the Russian Ecclesiastical Mission in Urmia.

=== 20th and 21st centuries ===
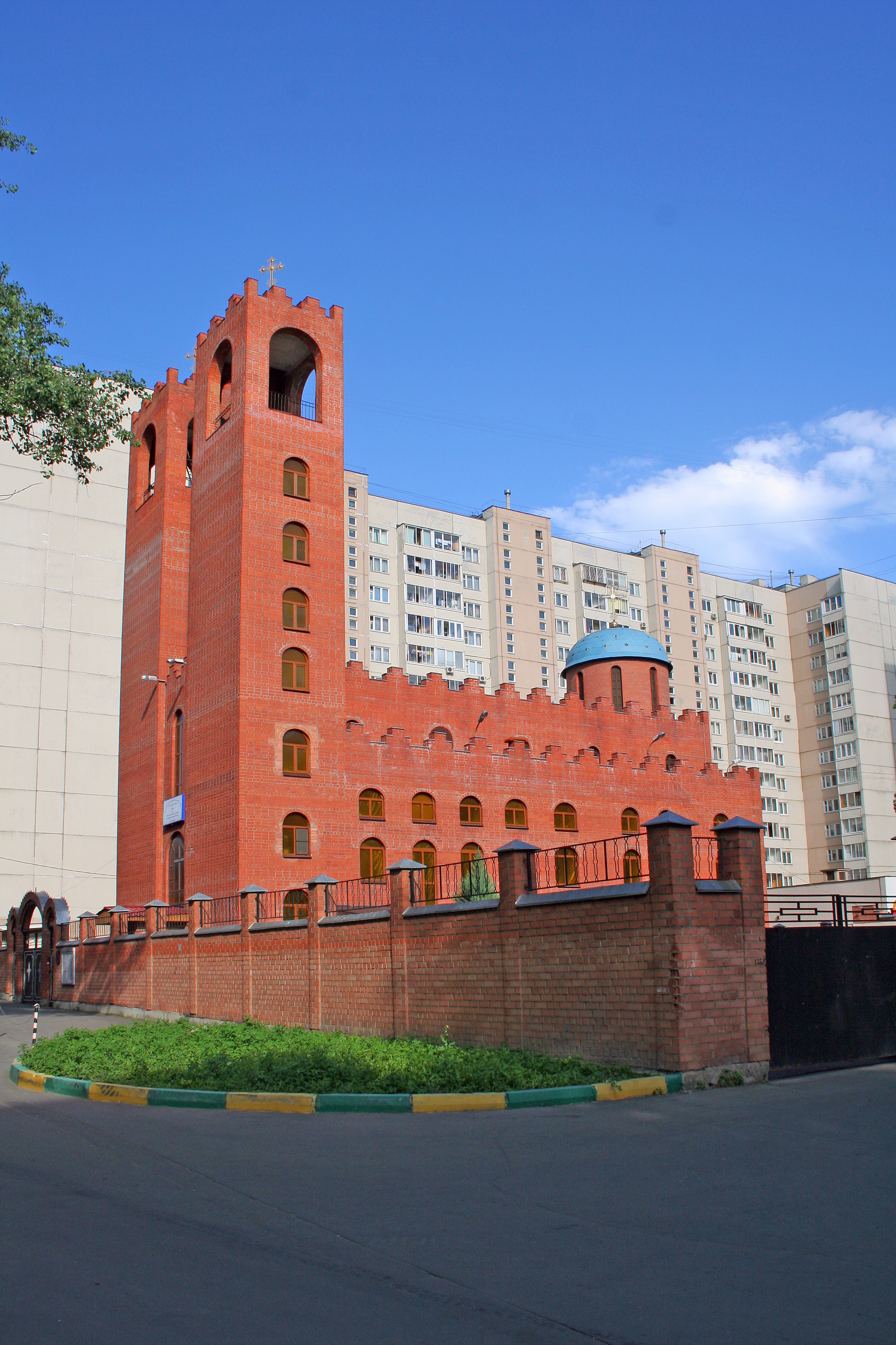
St. Mary Assyrian Church in Moscow. In spite of both ethnic and religious persecution and a serious decline in membership since its height around the fourth century, the Assyrian Church of the East has survived into the 21st century.

Among all the tragedies and schisms which thinned the church out, no other was as severe as the Assyrian genocide. At that point the Assyrian Church of the East was based in the mountains of Hakkari, as it had been since 1681. In 1915, The Young Turks invaded the region—despite the Assyrians' plea of neutrality during the Caucasus campaign by Russia and their Armenian allies—out of fear of an Assyrian independence movement. In response to this, Assyrians of all denominations (the Assyrian Church of the East, the Chaldean Catholic Church, the Syriac Orthodox Church and Assyrian Protestants) entered into a war of independence and allied themselves with the United Kingdom, the Russian Empire and the Armenians against the Ottomans and their Islamic Kurdish, Iranian and Arab allies.

Despite the odds, the Assyrians fought successfully against the Ottomans and their allies for three years throughout southeastern Turkey, northern Iraq, northwestern Iran and northeastern Syria. Eventually, however, they were abandoned by their allies, the Russian Empire and the First Republic of Armenia, due to the Russian Revolution and the collapse of the Armenian defense, leaving the Assyrians vastly outnumbered, surrounded, and cut off from supplies of ammunition and food. During this period, their See at Qodchanis was completely destroyed and the Turks and their Islamic allies massacred all of the Assyrians in the Hakkari Mountains.

Those who survived fled into Iran with what remained of the Assyrian defense under Agha Petros, but they were pursued into Iranian territory despite the fact they were fleeing. Later, in 1918, after the murder of their de facto leader and Patriarch Shimun XIX Benyamin and 150 of his followers during a negotiation, fearing further massacres at the hands of the Turks and Kurds, most of the survivors fled by train from Iran into what was to become Iraq. They sought protection under the British mandate there, and joined the already existing indigenous Assyrian communities of both Eastern Orthodox and Catholic rites in the north, where they formed communities in Baghdad, Basra, and other areas.

==== Patriarch Shimun XXI Eshai ====
In the aftermath of World War I, the British-educated Patriarch Shimun XXI Eshai, born into the line of patriarchs at Qodchanis, had agitated for an independent Assyrian state. Following the end of the British mandate in 1933 and a massacre of Assyrian civilians at Simele by the Iraqi Army, the patriarch was forced to take refuge in Cyprus. There, Shimun petitioned the League of Nations regarding his people's fate, but to little avail, and he was consequently barred from entering Syria and Iraq. He traveled through Europe before moving to Chicago in 1940 to join the growing Assyrian diaspora community there.

Due to the church's and the general Assyrian community's disorganized state as a result of the conflicts of the 20th century, Patriarch Shimun XXI Eshai was forced to reorganize the church's structure in the United States. He transferred his residence to San Francisco in 1954, and was able to travel to Iran, Lebanon, Kuwait, and India, where he worked to strengthen the church.

In 1964, the patriarch decreed a number of changes to the church, including liturgical reform, the adoption of the Gregorian calendar, and the shortening of Lent. These changes, combined with Shimun's long absence from Iraq, caused a rift in the community there, which led to another schism. In 1968, traditionalists within the church elected Thoma Darmo as a rival patriarch to Shimun XXI Eshai, forming the independent Ancient Church of the East, based in Baghdad, Iraq.

In 1972, Shimun decided to step down as patriarch, and the following year he got married, in contravention to longstanding church custom. This led to a synod in 1973 in which further reforms were introduced, the most significant of which included the permanent abolition of hereditary succession — a practice introduced in the middle of the fifteenth century by Patriarch Shemon IV Basidi (who had died in 1497) — and it was also decided that Shimun should be reinstated. The second matter was supposed to be settled at another synod in 1975; however, Shimun was assassinated in November 1975 by an estranged relative before this could take place.

==== Patriarch Dinkha IV ====
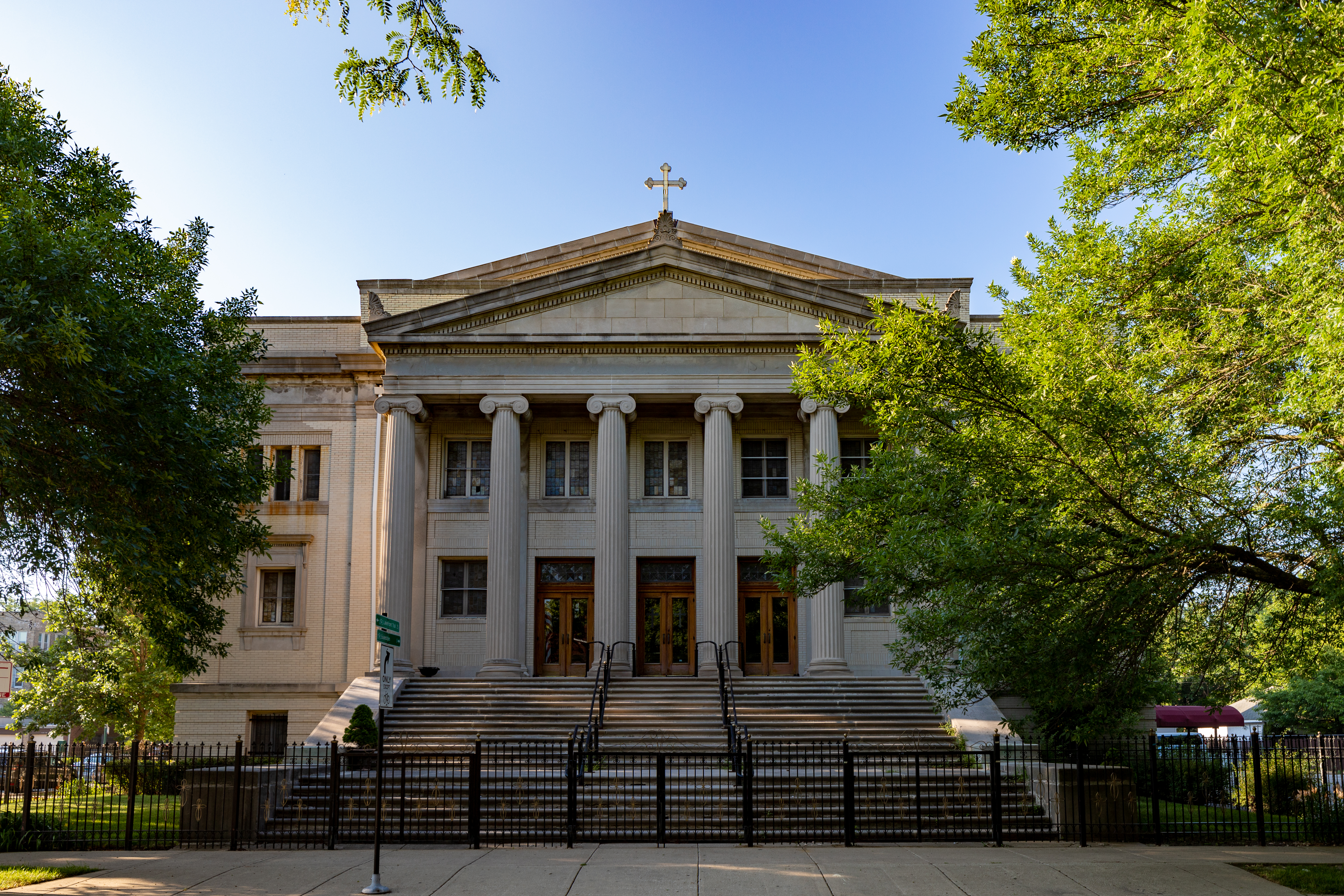
Mar Gewargis Assyrian Cathedral in Chicago: Former Patriarchal See

Almost a year after the death of Shimun, Mar Khnanya Dinkha, Metropolitan of Tehran, convened a synod of seven Assyrian bishops which took place at St Paul's Abbey, Alton, in England, from 12 to 17 October 1976. They were joined by two Church of England bishops, representing the Archbishop of Canterbury and the Bishop of London, and elected Dinkha as the 120th Catholicos-Patriarch of the Church of the East. On 17 October he was consecrated as Dinkha IV at St Barnabas Church, Ealing, in an area where many Assyrians lived.

Dinkha, who was then aged 33, operated his see at Tehran until the Iran–Iraq War of 1980–1988, when he went into exile in the United States and transferred the Patriarchal See to Chicago. Much of his patriarchate had been concerned with tending to the Assyrian diaspora community and with ecumenical efforts to strengthen relations with other churches. On 26 March 2015, Dinkha IV died in the United States, leaving the Assyrian Church of the East in a period of sede vacante until 18 September 2015. During that time, Aprem Mooken served as the custodian of the Patriarchate of Seleucia-Ctesiphon.

==== Patriarch Gewargis III ====
On 18 September 2015, the Holy Synod of the Assyrian Church of the East elected the Metropolitan of Iraq, Jordan, and Russia, Warda Sliwa, to succeed the late Dinkha IV as Catholicos-Patriarch of the Assyrian Church of the East. On 27 September 2015, he was consecrated as Catholicos-Patriarch in the Cathedral Church of St. John the Baptist, in Erbil, Iraq. Upon his consecration, he assumed the ecclesiastical name Gewargis III.

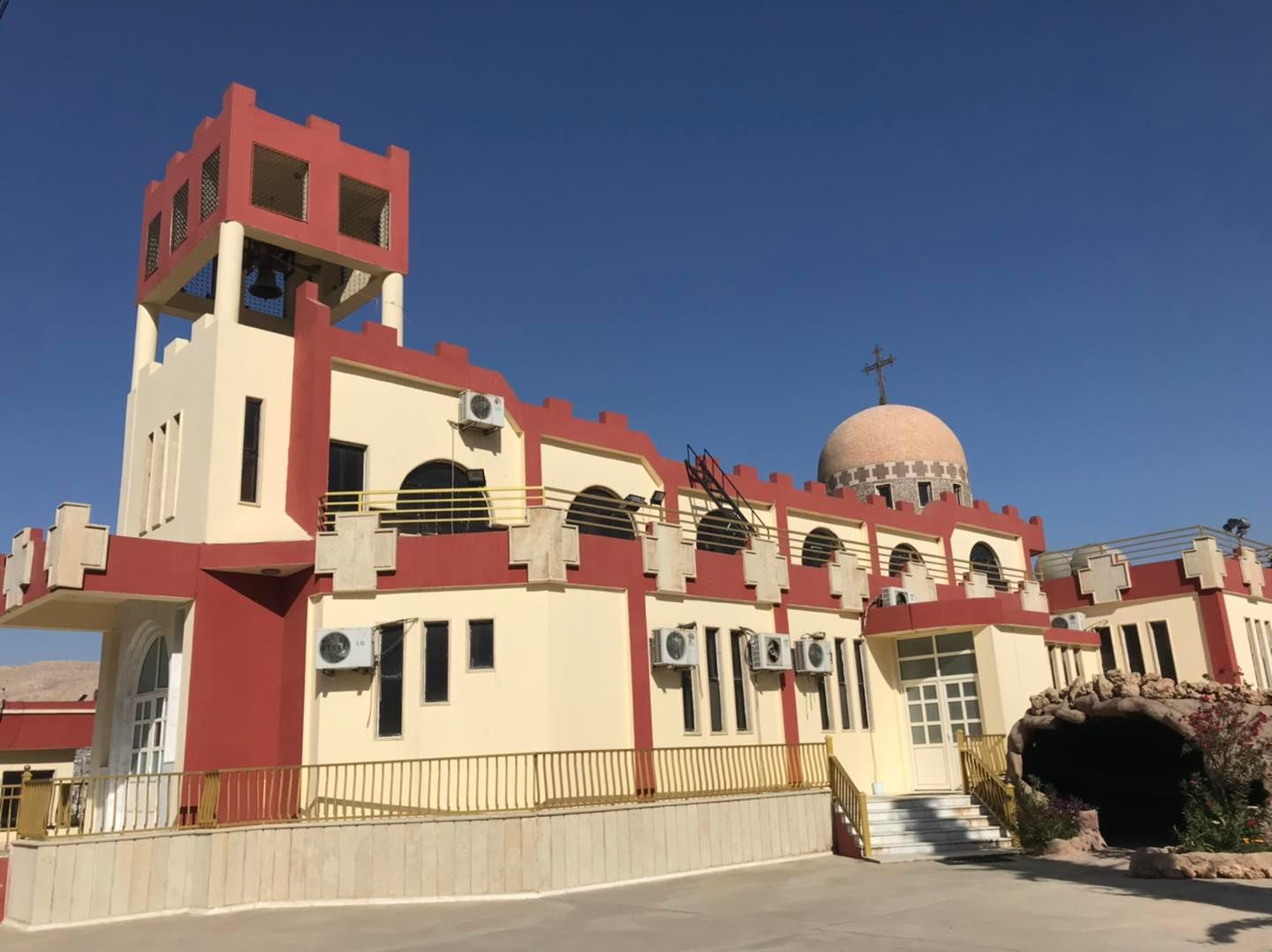
Mar Narsai Church in Nohadra

Church leaders proposed moving the Patriarchal See from Chicago back to Erbil.

There have also been talks of reunification. In the Common Christological Declaration Between the Catholic Church and the Assyrian Church of the East in 1994, the two churches recognized the legitimacy and rightness of each other's titles for Mary.

In 2005, the Assyrian Church of the East had about 380,000 members, mostly living in the United States, Iran, Iraq, Syria, and Turkey.

==== Patriarch Awa III ====
On 6 September 2021, Mar Gewargis III formally stepped down as Catholicos-Patriarch during an Extraordinary Session of the Holy Synod of the Assyrian Church of the East, leaving the Patriarchal See vacant. On 8 September 2021, the Holy Synod elected Mar Awa Royel, Bishop of California and Secretary of the Holy Synod, to succeed Mar Gewargis III as the 122nd Catholicos-Patriarch of the Assyrian Church of the East.

== Doctrine ==
Following doctrinal traditions of the ancient Church of the East, the modern Assyrian Church of the East recognizes the first two ecumenical councils: the First Council of Nicaea (325), and the First Council of Constantinople (381). The Assyrian Church follows trinitarian doctrines, expressed in the Nicene Creed, and professes the eternal procession of the Holy Spirit from the Father.

=== Christology ===
Theologically, the Assyrian Church of the East does not accept doctrinal definitions that were adopted at the Council of Ephesus (431) and the Council of Chalcedon (451), and still adheres to the Church of the East's traditional Christology, that is often labeled as Nestorian. The use and exact meaning of that term has been the subject of many debates, not only throughout history but also in modern times, since the Assyrian Church of the East has distinctive views on several Christological questions and claims that its theological doctrines and traditions are essentially Orthodox, while admitting the need for further inter-Christian dialogue that would resolve various questions in the field of comparative Christological terminology.

The Nestorian nature of Assyrian Christianity remains a matter of contention. Elements of Nestorian doctrine were explicitly repudiated by Patriarch Dinkha IV on the occasion of his accession in 1976.

The Christology of the Church of the East has its roots in the Antiochene theological tradition of the early church. The founders of Assyrian theology are Diodorus of Tarsus and Theodore of Mopsuestia, both of whom taught at Antioch. "Antiochene" is a modern designation given to the style of theology associated with the early church at Antioch, as contrasted with the theology of the Church of Alexandria.

Antiochene theology emphasizes Christ's humanity and the reality of the moral choices he faced. In order to preserve the impassibility of Christ's Divine Nature, the unity of his person is defined in a looser fashion than in the Alexandrian tradition. The normative Christology of the Church of the East was written by Babai the Great (d. 628) during the controversy that followed the 431 Council of Ephesus. Babai held that within Christ there exist two qnome (Syriac: ܩܢܘܡܐ / qnômâ, a complex term, equivalent for Greek term hypostasis), unmingled, but everlastingly united in the one prosopon (person) of Christ.

The precise Christological teachings of Nestorius are shrouded in obscurity. Wary of Monophysitism, Nestorius rejected Cyril's theory of a hypostatic union, adhering instead a much looser concept of prosopic union. Nestorianism came to mean radical Dyophysitism, in which Christ's two natures are eternally separate, though it is doubtful whether Nestorius ever taught such a doctrine. Nestorius' dispreference of the term Theotokos ('God-bearer', or 'Mother of God') has traditionally been held as evidence that he asserted the existence of two persons (dyoprosopism) — not merely two natures — in Jesus Christ, but there exists no evidence that Nestorius denied Christ's oneness. In the controversy that followed the Council of Ephesus, the term "Nestorian" was applied to all doctrine upholding a strictly Antiochene Christology. In consequence, the Church of the East was labelled Nestorian, though its official Christology was in fact defined by Babai the Great, at the council that was held in 612.

== Liturgy ==
The church employs the Syriac dialect of Eastern Aramaic in its liturgy, the East Syriac Rite, which includes three anaphoras, attributed to Addai of Edessa and Mari, Theodore of Mopsuestia, and later also Nestorius.

== Biblical canon ==
The Assyrians Church of East differs from the Catholic, Eastern Orthodox, and Oriental Orthodox churches in that it uses a unique form of the biblical canon, known as the Syriac Peshitta. Originally written in the Syriac dialect of the Aramaic language, It includes the traditional 46-book Old Testament, including the deuterocanon, but only uses 22 books in the New Testament. The Assyrian Church rejects as canonical the books of 2 Peter, 2 John, 3 John, Jude and Revelation, though some Peshitta Bibles still include the books as a matter of convenience.

== Iconography ==
In their homes, Christians belonging to the Assyrian Church of the East hang a Christian cross (without the corpus) on the eastern wall of the main room.

The Assyrian Church of the East does not make use of icons, and the interiors of its houses of worship are simple. Iconography has been present in the Church of the East's history; opposition to religious images eventually became the norm due to the spread of Islam in the region, which forbade any type of depictions of saints and biblical prophets. Thus, the church was forced to get rid of her icons.

A Nestorian Peshitta Gospel book written in Estrangela, from the 13th century, resides at the State Library of Berlin. This illustrated manuscript from Upper Mesopotamia or Tur Abdin proves that in the 13th century the church was not yet aniconic. The Nestorian Evangelion preserved in the Bibliothèque nationale de France contains an illustration depicting Jesus Christ (not a crucifix) in the circle of a ringed cross (in the form of Celtic cross) surrounded by four angels.

Three Syriac manuscripts from the early 19th century and earlier—they were edited into a compilation titled The Book of Protection by Hermann Gollancz—contain a number of illustrations which are more or less crude. These manuscripts prove the continuous use of images. Moreover, a life-size male stucco figure was discovered in a church of Seleucia-Ctesiphon from the late 6th century. Beneath this church were found the remains of an earlier church. Although it cannot be determined which Nestorian Church was involved, the discovery nevertheless proves that the Church of the East also used figurative representations.

== Organization ==
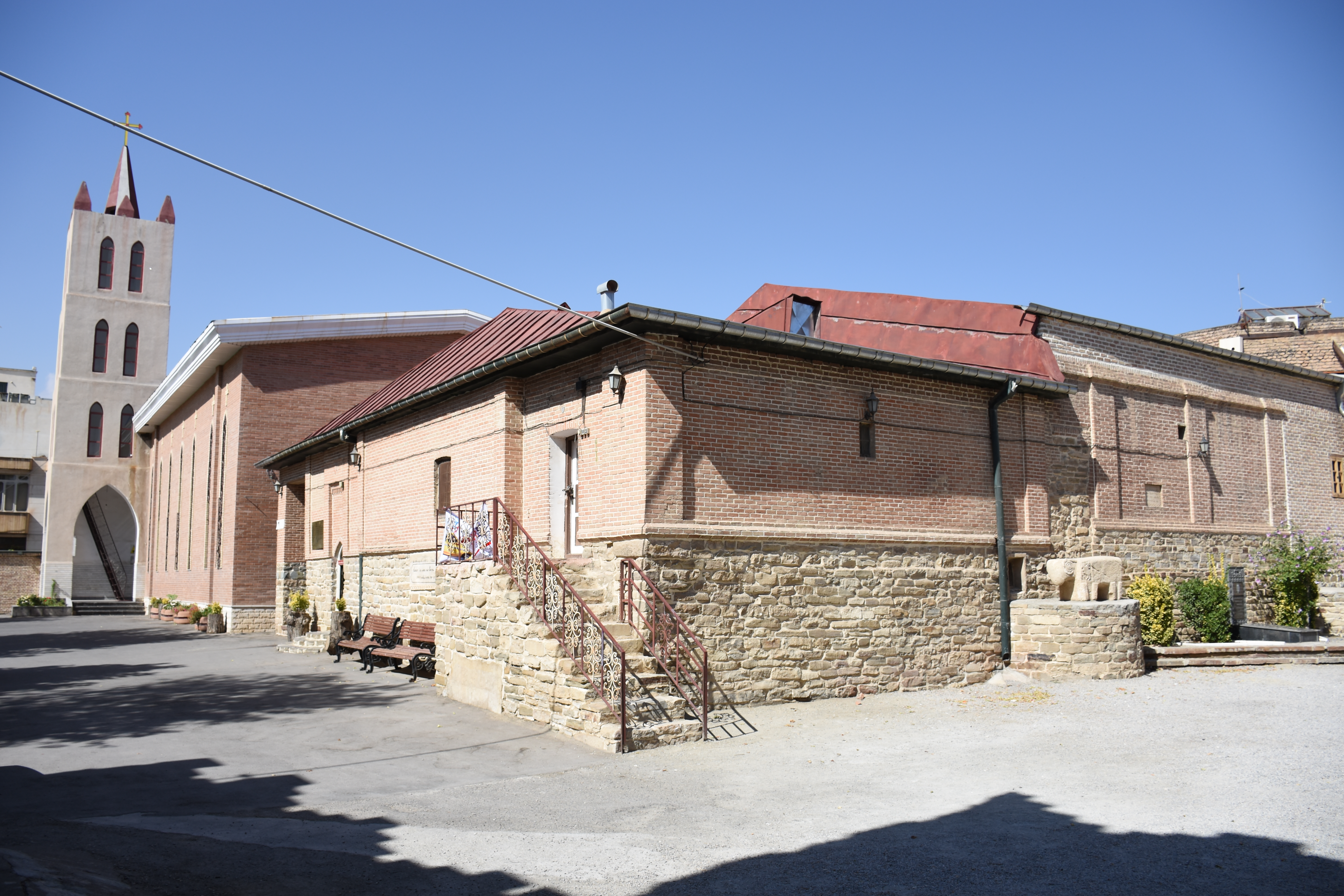
Saint Mary Church: an ancient Assyrian church located in the city of Urmia, West Azerbaijan province, Iran

The Assyrian Church of the East is governed by an episcopal polity, the same as other apostolic churches. The church maintains a system of geographical parishes organized into dioceses and archdioceses. The Catholicos-Patriarch is the head of the church. Its synod is composed of bishops who oversee individual dioceses and metropolitans who oversee episcopal dioceses in their territorial jurisdiction.

The Chaldean Syrian Church, which encompasses India and the Persian Gulf, is the largest diocese of the church. Its history goes back to the Church of the East that established a presence in Kerala, but the two communities maintained only a sporadic connection for several centuries, and consistent relations were only established with the arrival of the Portuguese in India around 1500. The church is represented by the Assyrian Church of the East and is in communion with it.

Membership is estimated to 385,000 adherents, although some sources say as high as 500,000. According to scholar James Minahan around 19% of the Assyrian people belong to the Assyrian Church of the East. In its own 2018 Report on Religious Freedom, the United States Department of State put the Assyrian Church of the East adherents at approximately 20% of the Christians in Iraq.

=== Hierarchy ===
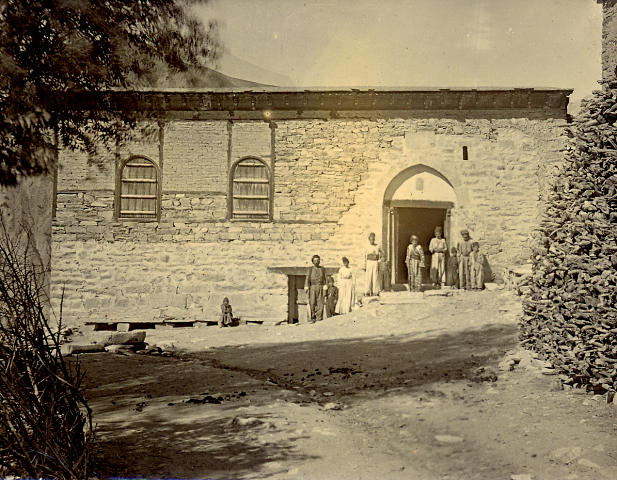
Residence of the Patriarch in Qudshanis, Ottoman Empire (1692–1918).

Due to the unstable political, religious and economic situation in the church's historical homeland of the Middle East, many of the church members now reside in Western countries. Churches and dioceses have been established throughout Europe, America, and Oceania.

=== Archdioceses ===
1. Archdiocese of Australia, New Zealand and Lebanon – established in October 1984.
2. Archdiocese of Syria – jurisdiction lies throughout all Syria, particularly in the al-Hasakah Governorate, where most of the community resides in al-Hasakah, Qamishli and the 35 villages along the Khabur River. There are also small communities in Damascus and Aleppo.
3. Archdiocese of India – the archdiocese's territory includes the city of Thrissur and surrounding, mostly in the state of Kerala.

=== Dioceses ===
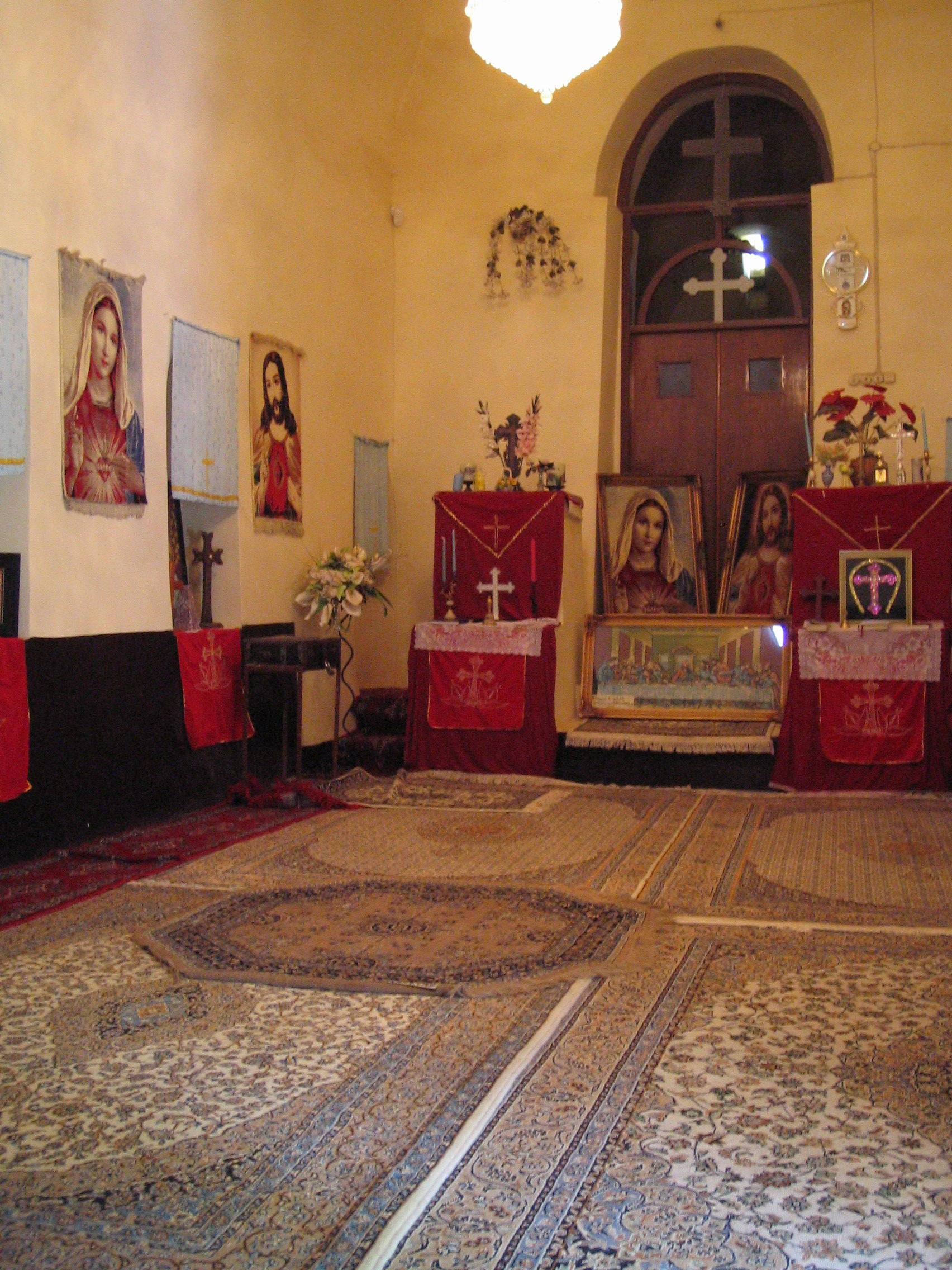
An ancient Assyrian church in the city of Urmia, Iran

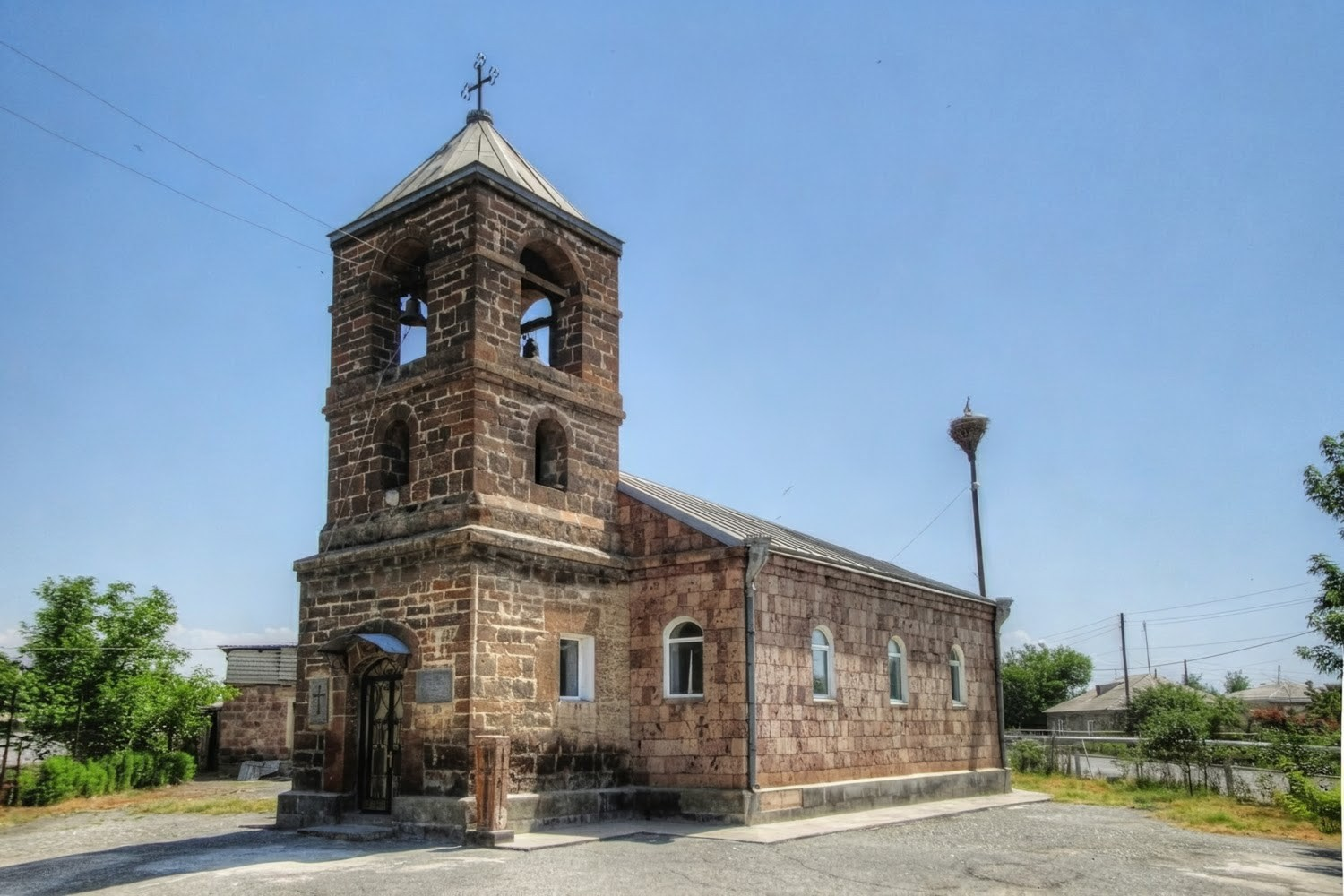
Saint Kirill Assyrian church in Dimitrov, Armenia

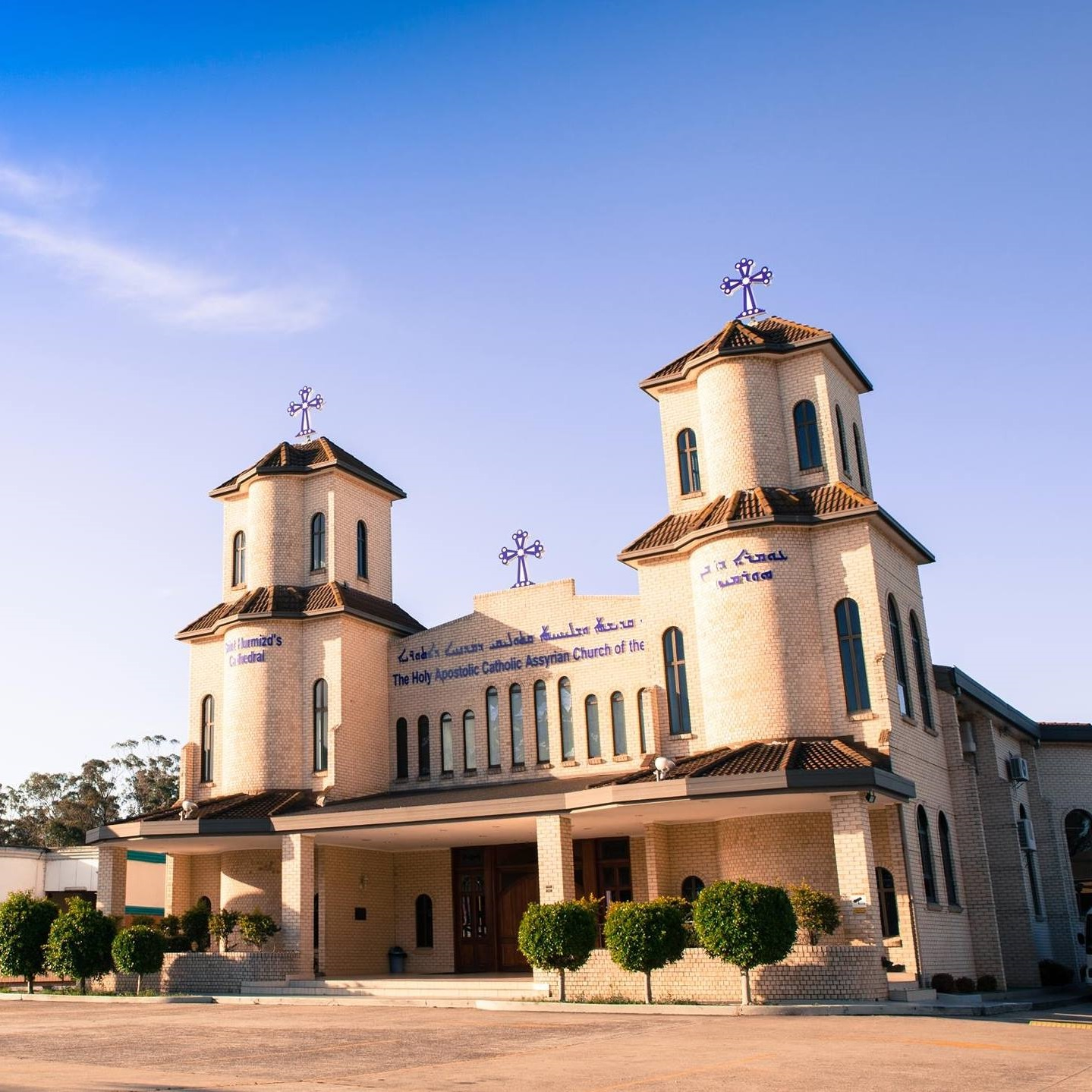
Saint Hurmizd cathedral in Greenfield Park, Sydney

1. Diocese of Iran – territory includes the capital Tehran, the Urmia and Salmas plains.
2. Diocese of Nohadra and Nineveh – established in 1999 with jurisdiction includes the indigenous communities of Dohuk and Nineveh.
3. Diocese of Baghdad, Russia and Georgia.
4. Diocese of Scandinavia and Germany – territory lies in western Europe and includes Denmark, Sweden, Germany, Finland and Norway.
5. Diocese of Eastern USA – formerly the patriarchal archdiocese from 1994 until 2012. The territory includes the large Chicago, Illinois community, along with smaller parishes in Michigan, New England and New York.
6. Diocese of California – jurisdiction includes parishes in Western US and northern California. Some of the parishes are San Francisco, San Jose, Modesto, Turlock, Ceres, Seattle, and Sacramento.
7. Diocese of Western United States – jurisdiction includes parishes in Arizona and southern California (Los Angeles).
8. Diocese of Canada – includes the territory of Toronto, Windsor, Hamilton and all Canada.
9. Diocese of Victoria and New Zealand – includes Melbourne and New Zealand.
10. Diocese of Western Europe – territory lies in Western Europe and includes the United Kingdom, France, Belgium, Luxembourg, Austria, the Netherlands and Greece.

=== Members of the Holy Synod ===
As of May 2024

1. Mar Awa III: 122nd Catholicos-Patriarch
2. Meelis Zaia: Metropolitan of Australia, New Zealand and Lebanon and Patriarchal Vicar General
3. Afram Athneil: Metropolitan of Syria
4. Awgin Kuriakose: Metropolitan of India and the Gulf Countries
5. Odisho Awraham: Bishop of Scandinavia and Germany
6. Narsai Benyamin: Bishop of Iran
7. Paulus Benjamin: Bishop of the Eastern United States
8. Abris Youkhannan: Bishop of Dohuk and Nineveh
9. Benyamin Elya: Bishop of Victoria and New Zealand and Secretary of the Holy Synod
10. Awraham Youkhanis: Bishop of Western Europe
11. Elia Tamras: Bishop of Baghdad, Ukraine and Georgia.

Retired:

- Sargis Yosip: Bishop Emeritus of Baghdad
- Aprim Khamis: Bishop Emeritus of the Western United States
- Emmanuel Yosip: Bishop Emeritus of Canada

== Demography ==
Statistics of the Assyrian Church of the East in 1850, according to George Percy Badger.

Population of the Assyrian Church of the East, 1850
Diocese	No. of Villages	No. of Churches	No. of Priests	No. of Families	Diocese	No. of Villages	No. of Churches	No. of Priests	No. of Families
Patriarch's	100	75	62	2,778	Jilu	18	14	10	1,168
'Aqra	15	13	9	249	Lewun & Norduz	15	9	7	222
Berwari	27	20	18	348	Shemsdin & Urmi	-	38	34	4,500
Gawar	45	34	18	1,082	Total	-	249	188	11,378
Gazarta	23	23	16	220					

Statistics of the Assyrian Church of the East in 1877, according to Edward Cutts.

Population of the Assyrian Church of the East, 1877
Diocese	No. of Villages	No. of Churches	No. of Priests	No. of Families	Diocese	No. of Villages	No. of Churches	No. of Priests	No. of Families
Patriarch's	96	88	81	2,274	Jilu	21	38	37	1,650
Anzel	34	23	22	972	Shemsdin	54	43	36	1,067
Ardishai	90	40	28	2,888	Supurghan	3	2	1	290
Gawar	74	56	43	1,497	Total	375	290	248	10,638

== Ecumenical relations ==
On November 11, 1994, a historic meeting between Patriarch Dinkha IV and Pope John Paul II took place in Rome. Both signed a document titled "Common Christological Declaration Between the Catholic Church and the Assyrian Church of the East". One side effect of this meeting was that the Assyrian Church of the East's relationship with the fellow Chaldean Catholic Church began to improve.

Τhe Assyrian Church of the East was never admitted a full member of the Middle East Council of Churches, due to the Coptic Orthodox Church accusing the Assyrian Church of the East to be Nestorian, and thus, heretical.

The lack of a coherent institution narrative in the Anaphora of Addai and Mari, which dates to apostolic times, has caused many Western Christians, and especially Roman Catholics, to doubt the validity of this anaphora, used extensively by the Assyrian Church of the East, as a prayer of consecration of the eucharistic elements. In 2001, after a study of this issue, Cardinal Joseph Ratzinger (later Pope Benedict XVI), then Prefect of the Congregation for the Doctrine of the Faith, promulgated a declaration approved by Pope John Paul II stating that this is a valid anaphora. This declaration opened the door to a joint synodal decree officially implementing the present Guidelines for Admission to the Eucharist between the Chaldean Church and the Assyrian Church of the East.

== See also ==
- Abda of Hira
- Chaldean Syrian Church in India (also known as Assyrian Church of the East in India)
- Church of the East in China
- Common Christological Declaration Between the Catholic Church and the Assyrian Church of the East
- Dioceses of the Church of the East to 1318
- Dioceses of the Church of the East, 1318–1552
- Dioceses of the Church of the East after 1552
- List of patriarchs of the East
- List of Assyrian settlements
- List of Assyrian tribes

== Sources ==
- Aboona, Hirmis (2008). Assyrians, Kurds, and Ottomans: Intercommunal Relations on the Periphery of the Ottoman Empire. Amherst: Cambria Press. ISBN 9781604975833.
- Abramtsov, David (1960). "The Assyrians of Persia and the Russian Orthodox Church". One Church. 14: 155–169.
- Assemani, Giuseppe Simone (1719). Bibliotheca orientalis clementino-vaticana. Vol. 1. Roma.
- Assemani, Giuseppe Luigi (1775). De catholicis seu patriarchis Chaldaeorum et Nestorianorum commentarius historico-chronologicus. Roma.
- Assemani, Giuseppe Luigi (2004). History of the Chaldean and Nestorian patriarchs. Piscataway, New Jersey: Gorgias Press.
- Badger, George Percy (1852). The Nestorians and Their Rituals. Vol. 1. London: Joseph Masters.
- Badger, George Percy (1852). The Nestorians and Their Rituals. Vol. 2. London: Joseph Masters. ISBN 9780790544823.
- Baum, Wilhelm; Winkler, Dietmar W. (2003). The Church of the East: A Concise History. London-New York: Routledge-Curzon. ISBN 9781134430192.
- Baumer, Christoph (2006). The Church of the East: An Illustrated History of Assyrian Christianity. London-New York: Tauris. ISBN 9781845111151.
- Becchetti, Filippo Angelico (1796). Istoria degli ultimi quattro secoli della Chiesa. Vol. 10. Roma.
- Becker, Adam H. (2015). Revival and Awakening: American Evangelical Missionaries in Iran and the Origins of Assyrian Nationalism. Chicago: University of Chicago Press. ISBN 9780226145310.
- Benjamin, Daniel D. (2008). The Patriarchs of the Church of the East. Piscataway: Gorgias Press. ISBN 9781463211059.
- Bethune-Baker, James F. (1908). Nestorius and His Teaching: A Fresh Examination of the Evidence. Cambridge: Cambridge University Press. ISBN 9781107432987.
- Binns, John (2002). An Introduction to the Christian Orthodox Churches. Cambridge: Cambridge University Press. ISBN 9780521667388.
- Brock, Sebastian P. (1996). "The 'Nestorian' Church: A Lamentable Misnomer" (PDF). Bulletin of the John Rylands Library. 78 (3): 23–35. doi:10.7227/BJRL.78.3.3.
- Brock, Sebastian P. (1999). "The Christology of the Church of the East in the Synods of the Fifth to Early Seventh Centuries: Preliminary Considerations and Materials". Doctrinal Diversity: Varieties of Early Christianity. New York and London: Garland Publishing. pp. 281–298. ISBN 9780815330714.
- Brock, Sebastian P. (2006). Fire from Heaven: Studies in Syriac Theology and Liturgy. Aldershot: Ashgate. ISBN 9780754659082.
- Burleson, Samuel; Rompay, Lucas van (2011). "List of Patriarchs of the Main Syriac Churches in the Middle East". Gorgias Encyclopedic Dictionary of the Syriac Heritage. Piscataway, NJ: Gorgias Press. pp. 481–491.
- Burgess, Stanley M. (1989). The Holy Spirit: Eastern Christian Traditions. Peabody, Mass.: Hendrickson Publishers. ISBN 9780913573815.
- Butts, Aaron M. (2017). "Assyrian Christians". In Frahm, Eckart (ed.). A Companion to Assyria. Malden: John Wiley & Sons. pp. 599–612. doi:10.1002/9781118325216. ISBN 9781118325216.
- Coakley, James F. (1992). The Church of the East and the Church of England: A History of the Archbishop of Canterbury's Assyrian Mission. Oxford: Clarendon Press. ISBN 9780198267447.
- Coakley, James F. (1996). "The Church of the East since 1914". The Bulletin of the John Rylands Library. 78 (3): 179–198. doi:10.7227/BJRL.78.3.14.
- Coakley, James F. (1999). "The Patriarchal List of the Church of the East". After Bardaisan: Studies on Continuity and Change in Syriac Christianity. Louvain: Peeters Publishers. pp. 65–84. ISBN 9789042907355.
- Coakley, James F. (2001). "Mar Elia Aboona and the history of the East Syrian patriarchate". Oriens Christianus. 85: 119–138. ISBN 9783447043809.
- Cross, Frank L.; Livingstone, Elizabeth A., eds. (2005). Oxford Dictionary of the Christian Church (3rd revised ed.). Oxford: Oxford University Press. ISBN 9780192802903.
- Fiey, Jean Maurice (1993). Pour un Oriens Christianus Novus: Répertoire des diocèses syriaques orientaux et occidentaux. Beirut: Orient-Institut. ISBN 9783515057189.
- Frazee, Charles A. (2006) [1983]. Catholics and Sultans: The Church and the Ottoman Empire 1453-1923. Cambridge: Cambridge University Press. ISBN 9780521027007.
- Gulik, Wilhelm van (1904). "Die Konsistorialakten über die Begründung des uniert-chaldäischen Patriarchates von Mosul unter Papst Julius III" (PDF). Oriens Christianus. 4: 261–277.
- Habbi, Joseph (1966). "Signification de l'union chaldéenne de Mar Sulaqa avec Rome en 1553". L'Orient Syrien. 11: 99–132, 199–230.
- Hage, Wolfgang (2007). Das orientalische Christentum. Stuttgart: Kohlhammer Verlag. ISBN 9783170176683.
- Heinrichs, Wolfhart (1993). "The Modern Assyrians - Name and Nation". Semitica: Serta philologica Constantino Tsereteli dicata. Torino: Zamorani. pp. 99–114. ISBN 9788871580241.
- Hartmann, Klaus-Peter (1980). Untersuchungen zur Sozialgeographie christlicher Minderheiten im Vorderen Orient. Wiesbaden: Reichert. ISBN 9783882260809.
- Hill, Henry, ed. (1988). Light from the East: A Symposium on the Oriental Orthodox and Assyrian Churches. Toronto: Anglican Book Centre. ISBN 9780919891906.
- Hunter, Erica C. D. (1996). "The church of the East in central Asia". The Bulletin of the John Rylands Library. 78 (3): 129–142. doi:10.7227/BJRL.78.3.10. S2CID 161756931.
- Hunter, Erica C. D. (2014). "The Holy Apostolic Catholic Assyrian Church of the East". Eastern Christianity and Politics in the Twenty-First Century. London-New York: Routledge. pp. 601–620. ISBN 9781317818663.
- Jakob, Joachim (2014). Ostsyrische Christen und Kurden im Osmanischen Reich des 19. und frühen 20. Jahrhunderts. Münster: LIT Verlag. ISBN 9783643506160.
- Jenkins, Philip (2008). The Lost History of Christianity: The Thousand-Year Golden Age of the Church in the Middle East, Africa, and Asia - and How It Died. San Francisco: HarperOne. ISBN 9780061472800.
- Joseph, John (2000). The Modern Assyrians of the Middle East: Encounters with Western Christian missions, archaeologists, and colonial power. Leiden: Brill Studies in Christian Mission. ISBN 978-9004116412.
- Kitchen, Robert A. (2012). "The Assyrian Church of the East". The Orthodox Christian World. London-New York: Routledge. pp. 78–88. ISBN 9780415455169.
- Lampart, Albert (1966). Ein Märtyrer der Union mit Rom: Joseph I. 1681–1696, Patriarch der Chaldäer. Einsiedeln: Benziger Verlag.
- Lemmens, Leonhard (1926). "Relationes nationem Chaldaeorum inter et Custodiam Terrae Sanctae (1551–1629)". Archivum Franciscanum Historicum. 19: 17–28.
- Lundgren, Svante (2016). The Assyrians: From Nineveh to Södertälje. Södertälje: Tigris Press. ISBN 9789198344127.
- O'Mahony, Anthony (2006). "Syriac Christianity in the modern Middle East". The Cambridge History of Christianity: Eastern Christianity. Vol. 5. Cambridge: Cambridge University Press. pp. 511–536. ISBN 9780521811132.
- Mooken, Aprem (2003). The History of the Assyrian Church of the East in the Twentieth Century. Kottayam: St. Ephrem Ecumenical Research Institute.
- Mooken, Aprem (2004). Patriarch Mar Dinkha IV: The Man and His Message. Trichur: Mar Narsai Press. ISBN 9788190220507.
- Murre van den Berg, Heleen (1999a). "The Patriarchs of the Church of the East from the Fifteenth to Eighteenth Centuries" (PDF). Hugoye: Journal of Syriac Studies. 2 (2): 235–264. doi:10.31826/hug-2010-020119. S2CID 212688640.
- Murre van den Berg, Heleen (1999b). From a Spoken to a Written Language: The Introduction and Development of Literary Urmia Aramaic in the Nineteenth Century. Leiden: Nederlands Instituut voor het Nabije Oosten. ISBN 9789062589814.
- Murre van den Berg, Heleen (2006). "A Neo-Aramaic Gospel Lectionary Translation by Israel of Alqosh". Loquentes linguis: Linguistic and Oriental Studies in Honour of Fabrizio A. Pennacchietti. Wiesbaden: Otto Harrassowitz Verlag. pp. 523–533. ISBN 9783447054843.
- Murre van den Berg, Heleen (2008). "Classical Syriac, Neo-Aramaic, and Arabic in the Church of the East and the Chaldean Church between 1500 and 1800". Aramaic in Its Historical and Linguistic Setting. Wiesbaden: Harrassowitz Verlag. pp. 335–352. ISBN 9783447057875.
- Murre van den Berg, Heleen (2009). "Chaldeans and Assyrians: The Church of the East in the Ottoman Period". The Christian Heritage of Iraq. Piscataway: Gorgias Press. pp. 146–164. ISBN 9781607241119.
- Murre van den Berg, Heleen (2011) [2009]. "Assyrian Apostolic Church of the East". The Encyclopedia of Christian Civilization. Vol. 1. Malden: Wiley-Blackwell. pp. 154–159.
- Murre van den Berg, Heleen (2013). "Light from the East(1948-1954) and the De-Territorialization of the Assyrian Church of the East". Religion Beyond its Private Role in Modern Society. Leiden: Brill. pp. 115–134. ISBN 9789004257856.
- Murre van den Berg, Heleen (2015). Scribes and Scriptures: The Church of the East in the Eastern Ottoman Provinces (1500-1850). Louvain: Peeters Publishers. ISBN 9789042930797.
- Murre van den Berg, Heleen (2015). "Classical Syriac and the Syriac Churches: A Twentieth-Century History". Syriac Encounters: Papers from the Sixth North American Syriac Symposium. Louvain: Peeters Publishers. pp. 119–148. ISBN 9789042930469.
- Mutlu-Numansen, Sofia; Ossewaarde, Marinus (2019). "A Struggle for Genocide Recognition: How the Aramean, Assyrian, and Chaldean Diasporas Link Past and Present" (PDF). Holocaust and Genocide Studies. 33 (3): 412–428. doi:10.1093/hgs/dcz045.
- Nichols, Aidan (2010) [1992]. Rome and the Eastern Churches: A Study in Schism (2nd revised ed.). San Francisco: Ignatius Press. ISBN 9781586172824.
- Садо, Стефан (1996). "Российская православная миссия в Урмии (1898-1918)" (PDF). Христианское чтение. 13: 73–112. Archived from the original (PDF) on 10 October 2017.
- Seleznyov, Nikolai N. (2010). "Nestorius of Constantinople: Condemnation, Suppression, Veneration: With special reference to the role of his name in East-Syriac Christianity". Journal of Eastern Christian Studies. 62 (3–4): 165–190.
- Spuler, Bertold (1961). "Die Nestorianische Kirche". Religionsgeschichte des Orients in der Zeit der Weltreligionen. Leiden: Brill. pp. 120–169. ISBN 9789004293816.
- Tisserant, Eugène (1931). "L'Église nestorienne". Dictionnaire de théologie catholique. Vol. 11. Paris: Letouzey et Ané. pp. 157–323.
- Vine, Aubrey R. (1937). The Nestorian Churches. London: Independent Press.
- Vosté, Jacques Marie (1925). "Missio duorum fratrum Melitensium O. P. in Orientem saec. XVI et relatio, nunc primum edita, eorum quae in istis regionibus gesserunt". Analecta Ordinis Praedicatorum. 33 (4): 261–278.
- Vosté, Jacques Marie (1931). "Mar Iohannan Soulaqa, premier Patriarche des Chaldéens, martyr de l'union avec Rome (†1555)". Angelicum. 8: 187–234.
- Wigram, William Ainger (1914). The Cradle of Mankind: Life in Eastern Kurdistan (PDF). London: Adam and Charles Black.
- Wigram, William Ainger (1929). The Assyrians and Their Neighbours. London: G. Bell & Sons.
- Wilmshurst, David (2000). The Ecclesiastical Organisation of the Church of the East, 1318–1913. Louvain: Peeters Publishers. ISBN 9789042908765.
- Wilmshurst, David (2011). The Martyred Church: A History of the Church of the East. London: East & West Publishing Limited. ISBN 9781907318047.
- Wilmshurst, David (2019). "The Patriarchs of the Church of the East". The Syriac World. London: Routledge. pp. 799–805. ISBN 9781138899018.
- Winkler, Dietmar W. (2003). Ostsyrisches Christentum. Untersuchungen zu Christologie, Ekklesiologie und zu den ökumenischen Beziehungen der Assyrischen Kirche des Ostens [Eastern Syriac Christianity. Studies on Christology, Ecclesiology and the Ecumenical Relations of the Assyrian Church of the East]. Münster: Lit. ISBN 3-8258-6796-X.
- Yakoub, Afram (2020). The Path to Assyria: A Call for National Revival. Södertälje: Tigris Press. ISBN 9789198154160.
- Yildiz, Efrem (1999). "The Assyrians: A Historical and Current Reality". Journal of Assyrian Academic Studies. 13 (1): 15–30.
- Yildiz, Efrem (2000b). "Los Asirio-Caldeos, Cristianos orientales arameoparlantes" (PDF). Dialogo Ecumenico. 35 (112): 263–282.
