= Joseph I (Chaldean Catholic patriarch) =

Head of the Chaldean Catholic Church from 1681 to 1696

Mar Joseph I
- Patriarch of the Chaldeans
- Church: Chaldean Catholic Church
- Archdiocese: Amid
- See: Amid of the Chaldeans
- Installed: 23 June 1681
- Term ended: 2 February 1696
- Predecessor: Shimun XII Yoalaha; Shimun XIII Dinkha (from 1692)
- Successor: Joseph II Sliba Maruf

Personal details
- Born: Yousip
- Died: 10 November 1707 Rome
- Residence: Amid, Turkey

Joseph I was the first incumbent of the Josephite line of Church of the East, thus being considered the Patriarch of the Chaldean Catholic Church from 1681 to 1696.

== Background situation ==
By 1660, the Church of the East had become divided into two patriarchates:

- the largest and oldest patriarchal see was based at the Rabban Hormizd Monastery of Alqosh. It spread from Aqrah up to Amid and Nisibis, covering in the South the rich plain of Mosul (it is known also as Eliya line). Since the 15th century its Patriarchs were appointed through an hereditary system.
- the second patriarchal see was located in Khosrowa, near Salmas (from 1672 in Qochanis) and extended into the North East mountains (it is also known as the Shimun line). This patriarchal line began in 1553 when Mar Yohannan Sulaqa was consecrated bishop by the Pope in 1553, but soon it lost the connections with Rome. The last patriarch of this line recognized by the Holy See was Shimun IX Dinkha (died 1600) and later there were only few correspondences through missionaries. This See reintroduced in 1600 the heredity system for patriarchs' succession, a use unacceptable for Rome. This patriarchal line still survives in the denomination today known as Assyrian Church of the East.

== Life ==
Although the town of Amid in 1553 has been the See of Yohanan Shimun VIII Sulaqa, the area of influence of the Shimun patriarchs moved soon eastward, and by 1660 the area of Amid was under the Alqosh's patriarchate. In 1667 the Capuchin missionary Jean-Baptiste de St-Aignan established there, teaching to omit the liturgical commemoration of Nestorius and to use the title Mother of God for Saint Mary.

Yousip (Joseph) was born in Amid and educated by the priest 'Abd Al-Ahad. He was consecrated metropolitan bishop of Amid between 1669 and 1672, and shortly after in 1672 became Catholic. The reaction of Alqosh's patriarch Eliya X (XI) Yukhannan Maraugin was very strong: he came personally to Amid, installed a traditionalist bishop named David and had Joseph to be twice imprisoned. Joseph was released only after payment of a ransom and had to leave for Rome. When Joseph returned in 1677, the bishop David fled to Egypt and the Ottoman authorities recognized Joseph's independence and his government over the dioceses of Amid and Mardin.

On June 23, 1681, arrived the formal recognition from Rome with the delivery of the pallium and the granting of the title "Patriarch of the Chaldean nation deprived of its patriarch". Thus into the Church of the East began a new patriarchal line in full communion with Rome.

Falling ill, in August 1694 Joseph I left Amid for Rome, and formally resigned in 1696. He died in Rome on Nov. 10, 1707.

The life of Mar Yousip I is mainly known by his biography written in the early 18th century by 'Adb Al-Ahad son of Garabet (bishop of Amid, died 1728) and later translated into French in 1898 by J.P. Chabot.

== Sources ==
- Frazee, Charles A. (2006) [1983]. Catholics and Sultans: The Church and the Ottoman Empire 1453-1923. Cambridge: Cambridge University Press. ISBN 9780521027007.
- Wilmshurst, David (2000). The Ecclesiastical Organisation of the Church of the East, 1318–1913. Louvain: Peeters Publishers. ISBN 9789042908765.

Preceded by Shimun XIII Dinkha	Patriarch of Babylon; 1681–1696	Succeeded by Joseph II Sliba Maruf
