= Shimun XIV Shlemon =

Mar Shimun XIV Shlemon
- Catholicos-Patriarch of the Church of the East
- Church: Church of the East (modern Assyrian Church of the East)
- Diocese: Patriarchal Diocese of Qodshanis
- See: Holy Apostolic See of Seleucia-Ctesiphon
- Installed: 1700
- Term ended: 1740
- Predecessor: Shimun XIII Dinkha
- Successor: Shimun XV Maqdassi Mikhail

Orders
- Rank: Catholicos-Patriarch

Personal details
- Born: Qodshanis, Hakkari, Ottoman Empire
- Died: 1740 Qodshanis, Hakkari, Ottoman Empire
- Denomination: Eastern Christian, Church of the East
- Residence: Qodshanis, Hakkari, Ottoman Empire

Mar Shimun XIV Shlemon was the Catholicos-Patriarch of the Shem'on line of the Church of the East (based in Qodshanis) from 1700 until 1740 that would eventually become the known as the Assyrian Church of the East.

== Sources ==
- Burleson, Samuel; Rompay, Lucas van (2011). "List of Patriarchs of the Main Syriac Churches in the Middle East". Gorgias Encyclopedic Dictionary of the Syriac Heritage. Piscataway, NJ: Gorgias Press. pp. 481–491.
- Murre van den Berg, Heleen H. L. (1999a). "The Patriarchs of the Church of the East from the Fifteenth to Eighteenth Centuries" (PDF). Hugoye: Journal of Syriac Studies. 2 (2): 235–264.
- Wilmshurst, David (2000). The Ecclesiastical Organisation of the Church of the East, 1318–1913. Louvain: Peeters Publishers.
- Wilmshurst, David (2019). "The Patriarchs of the Church of the East". The Syriac World. London: Routledge. pp. 799–805.

Assyrian Church of the East titles
Preceded by Shimun XIII Dinkha	Patriarch of the Church of the East; Shem'on line (Qodshanis); 1700 – 1740	Succeeded by Shimun XV Maqdassi Mikhail
