= Shimun XII Yoalaha =

Head of the Chaldean Catholic Church from 1656 to 1662

Mar Shimun XII Yoalaha
- Patriarch of the Chaldeans; Patriarch of the Church of the East
- Church: Chaldean Catholic Church; Church of the East
- See: Khosrau-Abad of the Chaldeans; Holy Apostolic See of Seleucia-Ctesiphon
- Installed: 1656
- Term ended: 1662
- Predecessor: Shimun XI Eshuyow
- Successor: Shimun XIII Dinkha as Patriarch of the Chaldeans and Patriarch of the Church of the East Joseph I as patriarch in communion with Rome (from 1681)

Personal details
- Died: 1662
- Residence: Khosrau-Abad near Salmas, Safavid Empire

Mar Shimun XII Yoalaha was the seventh Patriarch of the Chaldean Catholic Church, from 1656 to 1662.

He succeeded Patriarch Shimun XI Eshuyow, the seat of the patriarchate of Babylon of the Chaldean Catholic church being in Khosrau-Abad near Salmas, Safavid Empire during his reign.

Mar Shimun XII Yoalaha like his predecessors Shimun X Eliyah and Shimun XI Eshuyow was not formally recognized by Rome after the hereditary Shimun line of Patriarchs was reintroduced by Patriarch Shimun IX Dinkha in the Chaldean church. Hereditary succession is an unacceptable practice in Catholic Church.

His successor in 1662 was Shimun XIII Dinkha, the last of the Shimun line in the Chaldean Church.

== See also ==
- Patriarch of the Church of the East
- List of patriarchs of the Church of the East
- List of Chaldean Catholic patriarchs of Babylon

Chaldean Catholic Church titles Church of the East titles
Preceded by Shimun XI Eshuyow	Patriarch of the Chaldeans; Shemʿon line (Khosrou-Abad) (c. 1656 – c. 1662)	Succeeded by Shimun XIII Dinkha
Preceded by Shimun XI Eshuyow	Patriarch of the Church of the East; Shem'on line (Khosrou-Abad) (c. 1656 – c. 1662)	Succeeded by Shimun XIII Dinkha
