= List of patriarchs of the Church of the East =

The Patriarch of the Church of the East was the head of the Church of the East. According to tradition, the Church of the East was founded by the apostles Thomas, Addai, Aggai, and Mari in the first century AD. At the end of the third century or beginning of the fourth century AD, Papa bar Aggai, as bishop of Seleucia-Ctesiphon, was recognised as the first supreme head of the Church of the East, according to the Chronicle of Arbela. The bishopric of Seleucia-Ctesiphon was elevated to the status of metropolitan see at the Council of Seleucia-Ctesiphon in 410 and then granted the title of catholicos at the Synod of 424. The title of patriarch was also adopted prior to the end of the fifth century.

In the Schism of 1552, the Church of the East was split into two separate lines of patriarchs following the election of Shimun VIII Yohannan Sulaqa as patriarch and his establishment of union with the Catholic Church in 1553. However, the Shimun line formally dissolved the union with the Catholic Church in 1672 and thus a third line of patriarchs in union with Rome was formed with the appointment of Joseph I as patriarch in 1681. With the end of the Josephite line in 1828 and the appointment of Yohannan VIII Hormizd as patriarch of the Chaldean Catholic Church in 1830, the Shimun line became the sole remaining line not in communion with the Catholic Church. A schism erupted again in 1968 upon the election of Thoma Darmo as patriarch of the Ancient Church of the East, whilst the Church of the East was officially renamed the Assyrian Church of the East in 1976.

== List of patriarchs ==
=== Legendary bishops to c. 280 ===
Unless otherwise stated, all information is from the list provided in The Church of the East: An Illustrated History of Assyrian Christianity, as noted in the bibliography below.

- Thomas the Apostle (Note: It has been argued that Thomas the Apostle was first named as the first patriarch of the East by Bar Hebraeus as he is not mentioned in the lists of Mari ibn Suleiman or Amr ibn Matta. Lists that include Thomas the Apostle place his patriarchate in 33–73. Christoph Baumer's list in The Church of the East: An Illustrated History of Assyrian Christianity simply notes the death of Thomas the Apostle in AD 73.)
- Addai (37–65) (Note: The patriarchate of Addai is alternatively placed in 33–45. It has been argued that the legend of the Apostle Mar Addai was invented between the 3rd and 6th centuries.)
- Aggai (66–87) (Note: The patriarchate of Aggai is alternatively placed in 45–48.)
- Mari I (88–120) (Note: The patriarchate of Mari I is alternatively placed in 48–81. According to the 14th-century historian Amr ibn Matta, Mari established the patriarchal see at Seleucia-Ctesiphon and was thus the first catholicos. According to the Acts of Mar Mari, Mari personally ordained Papa bar Aggai as his successor.)
- Abris (121–137) (Note: Abris, Abraham I, and Yaqob I are believed to have been invented in the 9th-century.) (Note: The patriarchate of Abris is alternatively placed in 82–98 or 90–107.)
- Abraham I (159–171) (Note: The patriarchate of Abraham I is alternatively placed in 98–110/120 or 130–152.)
- Yaqob I (172–190) (Note: The patriarchate of Yaqob I is alternatively placed in 120–138, or 190.)
- Ahadabui (202–220) (Note: Ahadabui and Shahlufa were bishops of Adiabene, according to the Chronicle of Arbela. They were retrospectively listed as patriarchs by the historian Eliya ibn ʿUbaid in the 9th-century.) (Note: The patriarchate of Ahadabui is alternatively placed in 139–159/162, 202–204, or 205–220.)
- Shahlufa (220–240) (Note: The patriarchate of Shahlufa is alternatively placed in 162–179/182, 220–224, or 224–244.)

=== Bishops of Seleucia-Ctesiphon from c. 280 to 399 ===
- Papa bar Aggai (c. 280–329) (Note: The patriarchate of Papa bar Aggai is placed in either c. 280–329, 285–326/327, or 285/291–c. 327. According to the Acts of Mar Mari, Mari personally ordained Papa bar Aggai as his successor.)
- Shemon bar Sabbae (329–341) (Note: The patriarchate of Shemon bar Sabbae is alternatively placed in 320–330, 328–341, or 329–344.)
- Shahdost (341–342) (Note: Shahdost's patriarchate is alternatively placed in 340–343, 345–347, 341–343, or 344–345.)
- Barba'shmin (343–346) (Note: Barba'shmin's patriarchate is alternatively placed in 343–351, 345–346, or 350–358.)

vacant (346–363) (Note: A vacancy is alternatively placed in 346–388.)

- Tomarsa (363–371) (Note: Tomarsa's patriarchate is alternatively placed in 388–395.) (Note: It has been suggested that Tomarsa and Qayyoma were invented at a later date.)

vacant (371–377)

- Qayyoma (377–399) (Note: Qayyoma's patriarchate is alternatively placed in 395–399.)

=== Metropolitans of Seleucia-Ctesiphon from 399 to 421 ===
- Isaac (399–410) (Note: The patriarchate of Isaac is alternatively placed in c. 399/400–410/411.)
- Ahha (410–414) (Note: The end of the patriarchate of Ahha is alternatively placed in 415.)
- Yahballaha I (415–420)
- Mana (420)
- Farbokht (421)

=== Patriarchs of the Church of the East from 421 to 1558 ===
- Dadisho (421–456)
- Babowai (457–484)
- Acacius (485–496) (Note: The accession of Acacius is alternatively placed in 484. The end of the patriarchate of Acacius is alternatively placed in 495.)
- Babai (497–502/503) (Note: The end of the patriarchate of Babai is placed either in 502, or 503.)
- Shila (503–523)
- Elisha (524–537) (Note: The patriarchate of Elisha is placed in 524–535, 524–537, or 524–539.)
- Narsai (524–537) (Note: The patriarchate of Narsai is placed in either 524–537, or 524–539.)
- Paul (539) (Note: The patriarchate of Paul is placed in either 537–539, 537–538/539, or 539.)
- Aba I (540–552)
- Joseph (552–567) (Note: It is argued that the title of patriarch was probably first used by Joseph.)

vacant (567–570) (Note: The patriarchate of Ezekiel may have begun in 567 and thus no vacancy may have taken place.)

- Ezekiel (570–581) (Note: The patriarchate of Ezekiel is placed either in 567–581, 567/570–581, 570–581, or 570–582.)
- Ishoyahb I (582–595) (Note: The patriarchate of Ishoyahb I is placed in either c. 581/582–595, 582–595, 582–596, or 585–595.)
- Sabrisho I (596–604)
- Gregory (605–608) (Note: The patriarchate of Gregory is placed in 605–608, 605–609, or 605–c. 610.)

vacant (609–628) (Note: A vacancy is alternatively placed in 608–628.)

- Ishoyahb II (628–645) (Note: The patriarchate of Ishoyahb II is alternatively placed in 628–646.)
- Maremmeh (646–649) (Note: The patriarchate of Maremmeh is placed in either 645–648, 646–649, or 646–650.)
- Ishoyahb III (649–659) (Note: The patriarchate of Ishoyahb III is placed in either 649–659, 650–658, or 650–660.)
- Giwargis I (661–680) (Note: The patriarchate of Giwargis I is placed in either c. 659–680/681, 660–680, or 661–680.)
- Yohannan I (680–683) (Note: The patriarchate of Yohannan I is placed in either 680–683, or 680/681–683, or 681–683.)

vacant (683–685)

- Hnanisho I (686–698) (Note: The patriarchate of Hnanisho I is placed in either 685/686–699/700, 685–692/700, 685–700, or 686–698.)

Yohannan the Leper (691–693) (Note: Yohannan the Leper is considered an illegitimate patriarch. Yohannan the Leper is also counted as Yohannan II. The patriarchate of Yohannan the Leper is placed in either 691–693, c. 692, or 692–693.)
vacant (698–714)

- Sliba-zkha (714–728) (Note: The patriarchate of Sliba-zkha is alternatively placed in 713/714–727/728.)

vacant (728–731)

- Pethion (731–740) (Note: The patriarchate of Pethion is alternatively placed in 731–741.)
- Aba II (741–751)

vacant (751–753/754)
Surin (753) (Note: Surin is considered an illegitimate patriarch. The patriarchate of Surin is placed in either 751, 753, c. 754, or 754.)

- Yaqob II (753/754–773/775) (Note: The patriarchate of Yaqob II is placed in either 753–773, 754–773, or 754–775.)
- Hnanisho II (773/775–780) (Note: The patriarchate of Hnanisho II is placed in either 773–779/780, 773–780, 775–779, or 775–780.)
- Timothy I (780–823) (Note: The patriarchate of Timothy I is alternatively placed in 779/780–823.)
- Isho Bar Nun (823–828)
- Giwargis II (828–831) (Note: The patriarchate of Giwargis II is alternatively placed in 828–829/830.)
- Sabrisho II (831–835)

vacant (835–837)

- Abraham II (837–850)

vacant (850–853)

- Theodosius (853–858)

vacant (858–860)

- Sargis (860–872)

vacant (872–877)
Israel of Kashkar (877) (Note: Israel of Kashkar was not consecrated as patriarch.)

- Enosh (877–884)
- Yohannan II (884–892) (Note: The patriarchate of Yohannan II is alternatively placed in 884–891/892.)
- Yohannan III (893–899)
- Yohannan IV (900–905)
- Abraham III (906–937) (Note: The patriarchate of Abraham III is alternatively placed in 905–936/937.)
- Emmanuel I (937–960)
- Israel (961)

vacant (961–963)

- Abdisho I (963–986)
- Mari II (987–999)
- Yohannan V (1000–1011)
- Yohannan VI (1012–1020) (Note: The patriarchate of Yohannan VI is alternatively placed in 1012–1016.)
- Ishoyahb IV (1020–1025)

vacant (1025–1028)

- Eliya I (1028–1049)
- Yohannan VII (1049–1057) (Note: The patriarchate of Yohannan VII is alternatively placed in 1050–1057.)

vacant (1057–1064)

- Sabrisho III (1064–1072)

vacant (1072–1074)

- Abdisho II (1074–1090)

vacant (1090–1092)

- Makkikha I (1092–1110) (Note: The patriarchate of Makkikha I is alternatively placed in 1092–1109/1110.)
- Eliya II (1111–1132) (Note: The patriarchate of Eliya II is alternatively placed in 1111–1134.)

vacant (1132–1134) (Note: The patriarchate of Eliya II may have ended in 1134 and thus no vacancy may have taken place.)

- Bar Sawma (1134–1136)

vacant (1136–1139)

- Abdisho III (1139–1148) (Note: The patriarchate of Abdisho III is placed in either 1138–1148, 1139–1148, or 1139–1149.)
- Ishoyahb V (1149–1175)
- Eliya III (1176–1190)
- Yahballaha II (1190–1222)
- Sabrisho IV (1222–1224) (Note: The patriarchate of Sabrisho IV is alternatively placed in 1222–1225.)

vacant (1224–1226)

- Sabrisho V (1226–1256)
- Makkikha II (1257–1265)
- Denha I (1265–1281)
- Yahballaha III (1281–1317)
- Timothy II (1318–1332)

vacant (1332–1336/1337)

- Denha II (1336/1337–1381/1382) (Note: The patriarchate of Denha II is placed in either 1332–1364, 1336/1337–1381/1382, or 1337–1382.)
- Dinkha III (disputed) (Note: Dinkha III is not included in most lists. He appears only in the lists prepared by Iskhak Rehana and Gewargis David Malech which place his patriarchate in 1359–1368.)

vacant (1381/1382–c. 1385)

- Shemon II (c. 1385–c. 1405)
- Eliya IV (c. 1405–c. 1425)
- Shemon III (c. 1425–c. 1450)
- Shemon IV (c. 1450–1497) (Note: The patriarchate of Shemon IV is alternatively placed in 1437–1497.)
- Shemon V (1497–1502) (Note: The end of the patriarchate of Shemon V is placed in either 1501, or 1502.)
- Eliya V (1502–1503/1504) (Note: The patriarchate of Eliya V is placed in either 1502–1503, 1502–1504, or 1503–1504.)
- Shemon VI (1504–1538)
- Shemon VII Ishoyahb (1538/1539–1558) (Note: The patriarchate of Shemon VII Ishoyahb is placed in either 1538–1551, 1538/1539–1558, or 1539–1558.)
- Shemon VIII Dinkha (disputed) (Note: It is argued that Shemon VIII Dinkha was invented by supporters of Shimun VIII Yohannan Sulaqa and is thus not included in some lists. Lists that include Shemon VIII Dinkha place his patriarchate in 1551–1558.)

=== Patriarchs of the Church of the East from 1558 to 1861 ===
Eliya line

- Eliya VI (1558–1591) (Note: Eliya VI is also counted as Eliya VII. The patriarchate of Eliya VI is alternatively placed in 1558/1559–1591.)
- Eliya VII (1591–1617) (Note: Eliya VII is also counted as Eliya VIII.)
- Eliya VIII (1617–1660) (Note: Eliya VIII is also counted as Eliya IX.)
- Eliya IX (1660–1700) (Note: Eliya IX is also counted as Eliya X.)
- Eliya X (1700–1722) (Note: Eliya X is also counted as Eliya XI.)
- Eliya XI (1722–1778) (Note: Eliya XI is also counted as Eliya XII.)
- Eliya XII (1778–1804) (Note: Eliya XII is also counted as Eliya XIII.)
- Yohannan VIII Hormizd (1780–1830) (Note: Due to the irregularity of the election of Yohannan VIII Hormizd as patriarch in 1780, he was only recognised as patriarchal administrator by the Vatican. Yohannan VIII Hormizd was finally acknowledged as the Chaldean patriarch of Babylon in 1830.)

Shimun line

- Shimun VIII Yohannan Sulaqa (1553–1555) (Note: Shimun VIII Yohannan Sulaqa is also counted as John VIII.)
- Abdisho IV Maron (1555–1570)
- Abraham (disputed) (Note: Abraham is not included in some lists. Lists that include Abraham place his patriarchate in 1570–1577.)
- Yahballaha IV (1570–1580) (Note: The patriarchate of Yahballaha IV is placed in either 1570–1580, or 1577–1580. He is also listed as Shemʿon VIII Yahballaha or Yahballaha V. Some historians argue in favour of two separate patriarchates of Shemʿon (Yahbalaha) in 1572–1576 and Yahbalaha Shemʿon in 1577–1579/80. The traditional patriarchal list places the patriarchate of Shimun Yau-Alaha in 1558–1580.)
- Shimun IX Dinkha (1580–1600) (Note: The patriarchate of Shimun IX Dinkha is alternatively placed in 1581–1600.)
- Shimun X Eliyah (1600–1638)
- Shimun XI Eshuyow (1638–1656)
- Shimun XII Yoalaha (1656–1662)
- Shimun XIII Dinkha (1662–1700)
- Shimun XIV Shlemon (1700–1740)
- Shimun XV Maqdassi Mikhail (1740–1780)
- Shimun XVI Yohannan (1780–1820)
- Shimun XVII Abraham (1820–1861) (Note: The patriarchate of Shimun XVII Abraham is alternatively placed in 1820–1860.)

Josephite line

- Joseph I (1681–1696) (Note: The patriarchate of Joseph I is alternatively placed in 1681–1693.)
- Joseph II (1696–1712) (Note: The patriarchate of Joseph II is placed in either 1696–1712, or 1696–1713.)
- Joseph III (1714–1757) (Note: The patriarchate of Joseph III is alternatively placed in 1713–1757.)
- Joseph IV (1759–1781) (Note: The patriarchate of Joseph IV is alternatively placed in 1757–1796.)
- Joseph V Augustine Hindi (1781–1828) (Note: Augustine Hindi was appointed as patriarchal administrator by Joseph IV upon the latter's abdication in 1781 and received recognition of this appointment from the Vatican in 1802, but claimed the title of patriarch in 1818 and henceforth styled himself as Joseph V until his death. Wilmshurst places the reign of Augustine Hindi as patriarchal administrator in 1802–1827.)

=== Patriarchs of the Church of the East from 1861 to present ===
- Shimun XVIII Rubil (1861–1903) (Note: The patriarchate of Shimun XVIII Rubil is alternatively placed in 1860–1903.)
- Shimun XIX Benyamin (1903–1918)
- Shimun XX Paulos (1918–1920)
- Shimun XXI Eshai (1920–1975) (Note: Eshai Shimun began to style himself as Shimun XXIII Eshai from 1940 onwards. He is usually listed as Shimun XXI Eshai.)

Assyrian Church of the East

- Dinkha IV (1976–2015)
- Gewargis III (2015–2021)
- Awa III (2021–present)

Ancient Church of the East

- Thoma Darmo (1968–1969)
- Addai II Giwargis (1972–2022)

Yakoob III Danil (2022) (Note: Yakoob III Danil abdicated prior to his consecration as patriarch.)

- Gewargis III Younan (2023–present)

== See also ==
- List of Chaldean Catholic patriarchs of Baghdad

== Bibliography ==
- Assemani, Giuseppe Luigi (1775). De catholicis seu patriarchis Chaldaeorum et Nestorianorum commentarius historico-chronologicus. Roma.
- Assemani, Giuseppe Luigi (2004). History of the Chaldean and Nestorian Patriarchs. Piscataway, New Jersey: Gorgias Press.
- bar Brikha, ʿAbdishoʿ (1988) [1965]. The Book of Marganitha (The Pearl) on the Truth of Christianity. Translated by Shimun XXI Eshai. Chicago, United States: The Literary Committee of the Assyrian Church of the East, Chicago.
- Baum, Wilhelm; Winkler, Dietmar W. (2003). The Church of the East: A Concise History (PDF). London-New York: Routledge-Curzon. ISBN 9781134430192.
- Baum, Wilhelm (2004). "Die sogenannten Nestorianer im Zeitalter der Osmanen (15. bis 19. Jahrhundert)". Zwischen Euphrat und Tigris: Österreichische Forschungen zum Alten Orient. Wien: LIT Verlag. pp. 229–246. ISBN 9783825882570.
- Baumer, Christoph (2016). The Church of the East: An Illustrated History of Assyrian Christianity. London-New York: Tauris.
- Benjamin, Daniel D. (2008). The Patriarchs of the Church of the East. Translated by Youel A. Baaba. Piscataway: Gorgias Press. ISBN 9781463211059.
- Borbone, Pier Giorgio (2014). "The Chaldean Business: The Beginnings of East Syriac Typography and the Profession of Faith of Patriarch Elias". Miscellanea Bibliothecae Apostolicae Vaticanae. 20: 211–258.
- Broadhead, Edwin K. (2010). Jewish Ways of Following Jesus: Redrawing the Religious Map of Antiquity. Tübingen: Mohr Siebeck. ISBN 9783161503047.
- Burleson, Samuel; Rompay, Lucas van (2011). "List of Patriarchs of the Main Syriac Churches in the Middle East". Gorgias Encyclopedic Dictionary of the Syriac Heritage. Piscataway, NJ: Gorgias Press. pp. 481–491.
- Butts, Aaron M. (2017). "Assyrian Christians". In Frahm, Eckart (ed.). A Companion to Assyria. Malden: John Wiley & Sons. pp. 599–612. doi:10.1002/9781118325216. ISBN 9781118325216.
- Coakley, James F. (1999). "The Patriarchal List of the Church of the East". After Bardaisan: Studies on Continuity and Change in Syriac Christianity. Louvain: Peeters Publishers. pp. 65–84. ISBN 9789042907355.
- Coakley, James F. (2001). "Mar Elia Aboona and the History of the East Syrian Patriarchate". Oriens Christianus. 85: 119–138. ISBN 9783447042871.
- Fiey, Jean Maurice (1970). Jalons pour une histoire de l'Église en Iraq. Louvain: Secretariat du CSCO.
- Fiey, Jean Maurice (1979) [1963]. Communautés syriaques en Iran et Irak des origines à 1552. London: Variorum Reprints. ISBN 9780860780519.
- Fiey, Jean Maurice (1993). Pour un Oriens Christianus Novus: Répertoire des diocèses syriaques orientaux et occidentaux. Beirut: Orient-Institut. ISBN 9783515057189.
- Foster, John (1939). The Church of the T'ang Dynasty. London: Society for Promoting Christian Knowledge.
- Hage, Wolfgang (2007). Das orientalische Christentum. Stuttgart: Kohlhammer Verlag. ISBN 9783170176683.
- Jakob, Joachim (2014). Ostsyrische Christen und Kurden im Osmanischen Reich des 19. und frühen 20. Jahrhunderts. Münster: LIT Verlag. ISBN 9783643506160.
- Lampart, Albert (1966). Ein Märtyrer der Union mit Rom: Joseph I. 1681-1696, Patriarch der Chaldäer. Köln: Benziger Verlag.
- Macomber, William F. (1969). "A Funeral Madraša on the Assassination of Mar Hnanišo". Mémorial Mgr Gabriel Khouri-Sarkis (1898-1968). Louvain: Imprimerie orientaliste. pp. 263–273.
- Malech, George David; Malech, Nestorius George (2006) [1910]. History of the Syrian Nation and the Old Evangelical-Apostolic Church of the East: From Remote Antiquity to the Present Time. Gorgias Press.
- Meyendorff, John (1989). Imperial unity and Christian divisions: The Church 450-680 A.D. The Church in history. Vol. 2. Crestwood, NY: St. Vladimir's Seminary Press. ISBN 9780881410563.
- Mooken, Aprem (1983). The Chaldean Syrian Church of the East. Delhi: National Council of Churches in India.
- Murre van den Berg, Heleen H. L. (1999). "The Patriarchs of the Church of the East from the Fifteenth to Eighteenth Centuries" (PDF). Hugoye: Journal of Syriac Studies. 2 (2): 235–264. doi:10.31826/hug-2010-020119. S2CID 212688640.
- Nicholson, Oliver, ed. (2018). The Oxford Dictionary of Late Antiquity. Oxford University Press.
- Stewart, John (1928). Nestorian Missionary Enterprise: A Church on Fire. Edinburgh: T. & T. Clark.
- Tang, Li; Winkler, Dietmar W., eds. (2013). From the Oxus River to the Chinese Shores: Studies on East Syriac Christianity in China and Central Asia. Münster: LIT Verlag. ISBN 9783643903297.
- Tfinkdji, Joseph (1914). "L' église chaldéenne catholique autrefois et aujourd'hui". Annuaire Pontifical Catholique. 17: 449–525.
- Tisserant, Eugène (1931). "L'Église nestorienne". Dictionnaire de théologie catholique. Vol. 11. Paris: Letouzey et Ané. pp. 157–323.
- Vine, Aubrey R. (1937). The Nestorian Churches. London: Independent Press.
- Vosté, Jacques Marie (1930). "Les inscriptions de Rabban Hormizd et de N.-D. des Semences près d'Alqoš (Iraq)". Le Muséon. 43: 263–316.
- Vosté, Jacques Marie (1931). "Mar Iohannan Soulaqa, premier Patriarche des Chaldéens, martyr de l'union avec Rome (†1555)". Angelicum. 8: 187–234.
- Wigram, William Ainger (1986) [1st pub. 1910]. An Introduction to the History of the Assyrian Church or The Church of the Sassanid Persian Empire 100-640 A.D. London: Society for Promoting Christian Knowledge. ISBN 9780837080789.
- Wilmshurst, David (2000). The Ecclesiastical Organisation of the Church of the East, 1318–1913 (PDF). Peeters Publishers.
- Wilmshurst, David (2011). The martyred Church: A History of the Church of the East. London: East & West Publishing Limited. ISBN 9781907318047.
- Wilmshurst, David (2016). Bar Hebraeus The Ecclesiastical Chronicle: An English Translation. Gorgias Press.
- Wilmshurst, David (2019). "The patriarchs of the Church of the East". The Syriac World. London: Routledge. pp. 799–805. ISBN 9781138899018.
- Walker, Williston (1985) [1918]. A history of the Christian Church. New York: Scribner. ISBN 9780684184173.
- Wood, Philip (2013). The Chronicle of Seert: Christian Historical Imagination in Late Antique Iraq. Oxford University Press.
