= Yahballaha IV =

Head of the Chaldean Catholic Church from 1572 to 1580

Mar Shimun Yahballaha
- Patriarch of the Chaldeans
- Church: Chaldean Catholic Church
- See: Siirt of the Chaldeans
- Installed: c. 1572
- Term ended: c. 1580
- Predecessor: Abdisho IV Maron
- Successor: Shimun IX Dinkha

Personal details
- Died: 1580
- Residence: possibly Siirt, Ottoman Empire

Shimun Yahballaha, also designated in some modern historiographical works as Yahballaha IV, or even Yahballaha V, was Patriarch of the pro-Catholic line of primates of the Church of the East, from c. 1572 to c. 1580. In primary sources, he is mentioned as patriarch Shimun by several inscriptions dated from 1572 to 1577, while his additional name Yahballaha is recorded in a later report, submitted to Rome (1581) by metropolitan Eliya. The same report describes recently deceased patriarch Yahballaha Shimun as an elderly hierarch, who was elected to the patriarchal see sometime after the death of Abdisho IV Maron (d. 1570), but did not seek confirmation from Rome, due to his advanced age.

Modern scholars have proposed various solutions for complex questions related to this patriarch. Some assumed that he was ordained bishop of Gazireh in 1556 by previous patriarch Abdisho IV, but that assumption was not confirmed by later examination of primary sources. Others proposed that at first he acted as an administrator of the patriarchal throne for several years, and place his election in 1577, or 1578. Some authors have also left opened the possibility that during the period from 1570 to 1580 there were two patriarchs, Shemon Yahbalaha (1572–1576), and Yahbalaha Shemon (1577–1579/80). Those questions remain opened, because of the fragmentary nature of primary sources.

== See also ==
- Patriarch of the Church of the East
- List of patriarchs of the Church of the East
- List of Chaldean Catholic Patriarchs

== Sources ==
- Baum, Wilhelm; Winkler, Dietmar W. (2003). The Church of the East: A Concise History. London-New York: Routledge-Curzon. ISBN 978-1-134-43019-2.
- Baumer, Christoph (2006). The Church of the East: An Illustrated History of Assyrian Christianity. London-New York: Tauris. ISBN 978-1-84511-115-1.
- Benjamin, Daniel D. (2008). The Patriarchs of the Church of the East. Piscataway: Gorgias Press. ISBN 978-1-4632-1105-9.
- Burleson, Samuel; Rompay, Lucas van (2011). "List of Patriarchs of the Main Syriac Churches in the Middle East". Gorgias Encyclopedic Dictionary of the Syriac Heritage. Piscataway, NJ: Gorgias Press. pp. 481–491.
- Coakley, James F. (1999). "The Patriarchal List of the Church of the East". After Bardaisan: Studies on Continuity and Change in Syriac Christianity. Louvain: Peeters Publishers. pp. 65–84. ISBN 978-90-429-0735-5.
- Coakley, James F. (2001). "Mar Elia Aboona and the History of the East Syrian Patriarchate". Oriens Christianus. 85: 119–138. ISBN 978-3-447-04287-1.
- Lampart, Albert (1966). Ein Märtyrer der Union mit Rom: Joseph I. 1681-1696, Patriarch der Chaldäer. Köln: Benziger Verlag.
- Murre van den Berg, Heleen H. L. (1999). "The Patriarchs of the Church of the East from the Fifteenth to Eighteenth Centuries" (PDF). Hugoye: Journal of Syriac Studies. 2 (2): 235–264. doi:10.31826/hug-2010-020119. S2CID 212688640.
- Tfinkdji, Joseph (1914). "L' église chaldéenne catholique autrefois et aujourd'hui". Annuaire Pontifical Catholique. 17: 449–525.
- Tisserant, Eugène (1931). "L'Église nestorienne". Dictionnaire de théologie catholique. Vol. 11. Paris: Letouzey et Ané. pp. 157–323.
- Wilmshurst, David (2000). The Ecclesiastical Organisation of the Church of the East, 1318–1913. Louvain: Peeters Publishers. ISBN 978-90-429-0876-5.
- Wilmshurst, David (2011). The martyred Church: A History of the Church of the East. London: East & West Publishing Limited. ISBN 978-1-907318-04-7.
- Wilmshurst, David (2019). "The Patriarchs of the Church of the East". The Syriac World. London: Routledge. pp. 799–805. ISBN 978-1-138-89901-8.

Chaldean Catholic Church titles
Preceded by Abdisho IV Maron	Patriarch of the Chaldeans; Shemʿon line (Mosul) (c. 1572 – c. 1580)	Succeeded by Shimun IX Dinkha
