= Aprem Natniel =

Mar Aprem Natniel
- Title: Bishop of Syria

Religious life
- Religion: Assyrian Church of the East

Mar Aprem Natniel is the Assyrian Church of the East Bishop of Syria.

== See also ==
- Assyrian Church of the East's Holy Synod
