= List of Chaldean Catholic patriarchs of Baghdad =

This is a list of the Chaldean Catholicoi-Patriarchs of Baghdad, formerly Babylon, the leaders of the Chaldean Catholic Church and one of the Patriarchs of the east of the Catholic Church starting from 1553 following the schism of 1552 which caused a break in the Church of the East, which later led to the founding of the Chaldean Catholic Church.

This list continues from the list of patriarchs of the Church of the East that traces itself back from the Church founded in Mesopotamia in the 1st century and which became known as the Church of the East.

== Patriarchs of Baghdad for the Chaldeans ==
=== The Shimun line ===
In 1553, Mar Yohannan Sulaqa, willing to separate from the Church of the East's Patriarchal See of Alqosh, an Assyrian town in the Assyrian homeland, went to Rome asking for his appointment as Patriarch. He was consecrated in St. Peter's Basilica on 9 April 1553.

- 93. Shimun VIII Yohannan Sulaqa (1553–1555) — fixed the See in Amid
- 94. Abdisho IV Maron (1555–1570) — moved the See near Siirt
- Vacant (1570–1572)
- 95. Yahballaha IV (1572–1580)
- 96. Shimun IX Dinkha (1580–1600) — moved the see to Urmia, was the last patriarch of the Shimun line to be formally recognized by Rome, reintroduced the hereditary succession
- 97. Shimun X Eliyah (1600–1638) — moved the see to Salmas; never recognized by Rome
- 98. Shimun XI Eshuyow (1638–1656) — never recognized by Rome
- 99. Shimun XII Yoalaha (1656–1662) — never recognized by Rome
- 100. Shimun XIII Dinkha (1662–1692; died in 1700) — moved the see to Qochanis, formally broke full communion with Rome in 1692, while continuing as patriarch to be independent of the Alqosh patriarchal line. His successors in the Shimun line eventually became the sole line remaining within what later adopted the name Assyrian Church of the East

=== The Josephite line of Amid ===
The Catholic Patriarchs based in Amid, now Diyarbakır in southeastern Turkey, began with Joseph I who in 1667 became Catholic, obtained from the Turkish civil authorities in 1677 recognition of his independence from the non-Catholic patriarchal see of Alqosh. In 1681, Joseph I was recognized by Rome as "patriarch of the Chaldean nation deprived of its patriarch", because of the irregular situation in which the Shimun line had fallen since Shimun X. The numbering of the ensuing list reflect this conflict.

- 97. Joseph I (1681–1696)
- 98. Joseph II Sliba Maruf (1696–1713)
- 99. Joseph III Timothy Maroge (1713–1757)
- 100. Joseph IV Lazare Hindi (1757–1780)
  - Joseph V Augustine Hindi (1780–1827), (never patriarch, but patriarchal administrator from 1802, apostolic delegate for the Patriarchate of Babylon from 1812).

From 1830, the post of Catholic patriarch continued under Yohannan VIII Hormizd as Patriarch of Babylon and head of what is now called the Chaldean Catholic Church.

=== The Alqosh/Mosul line ===
In the 17th and 18th centuries, Alqosh was the seat of what, until the setting up of the Shimun line, had been the only patriarchal line, tracing its origins from the Apostle Thomas in the 1st century. This line is called the Eliyya line, because of the name that each of its successive patriarchs assumed. In 1771, the Alqosh Patriarch Eliyya XII Denkha (1722–1778) entered communion with the Catholic Church. However, on his death in 1778, his successor Eliyya XIII Ishoʿyahb, after obtaining recognition by Rome, quickly repudiated the union and returned to the traditional doctrine. His cousin Yohannan VIII Hormizd professed the Catholic faith and won others to the same faith. When Eliyya IX Ishoʿyahb died in 1804, no successor was elected and Yohannan Hormizd remained the only representative of the line. Rome recognized him in 1783 as metropolitan bishop of Mosul and administrator of the Alqosh/Mosul patriarchate. Only in 1830, after the death in 1827 of Augustine Hindi, the representative of the Josephite line, who had also been under consideration for recognition as the Catholic patriarch, was he acknowledged by Rome as patriarch.

- 101. Yohannan VIII Hormizd (1830–1838) — had his see in Mosul
- 102. Nicholas I Zaya (1839–1846)
- 103. Joseph VI Audo (1847–1878)
- 104. Eliya XIV Abulyonan (1878–1894)
- 105. Audishu V Khayyath (1894–1899) (Georges Ebed-Iesu)
- 106. Yousef VI Emmanuel II Thomas (1900–1946)
- 107. Yousef VII Ghanima (1946–1958) — moved the see to Baghdad
- 108. Paul II Cheikho (1958–1989)
- 109. Raphael I Bidawid (1989–2003)
- 110. Emmanuel III Delly (2003–2012) (retired on 19 December 2012), elevated to cardinal in 2007
- 111. Louis Raphaël I Sako (31 January 2013–10 March 2026, resigned), elevated to cardinal in 2018
- 112. Paul III Nona (since 12 April 2026)

On 19 February 2022, Pope Francis acceded to the request of the Synod of Bishops of the Chaldean Church and changed this title to Patriarch of Baghdad of the Chaldeans.

== See also ==
- Chaldean Catholic Patriarchate of Baghdad
- List of patriarchs of the Church of the East
- Assyrian Church of the East
- Assyria
- Assyrian people
