= Yohannan VII =

Patriarch of the Church of the East from 1049 to 1057

Mar Yohannan VII
- Patriarch of the Church of the East
- Church: Church of the East
- See: Seleucia-Ctesiphon
- Installed: 1049
- Term ended: 1057
- Predecessor: Eliya I
- Successor: Sabrisho III
- Other post: Bishop of Qasr

Personal details
- Born: Yohannan bar Targhal
- Died: 1057
- Residence: Baghdad

Yohannan VII bar Targhal was Patriarch of the Church of the East from 1049 to 1057. He lived through the final years of the Buyid dynasty, and was present in Baghdad when Toghrul Beg, the first sultan of the Seljuq dynasty, entered the city in December 1055. His patriarchate was dominated by communal rioting in Baghdad between Shiite Moslems loyal to the Buyids and Sunni Moslems who supported the Seljuqs. During these riots the Greek Palace, the residence of the Nestorian patriarchs, was twice pillaged.

== Sources ==
Brief accounts of Yohannan's patriarchate are given in the Ecclesiastical Chronicle of the Jacobite writer Bar Hebraeus (fl. 1280) and in the ecclesiastical histories of the Nestorian writers Mari (twelfth-century), ʿAmr ibn Mattā and Ṣalībā ibn Yūḥannā (fourteenth-century).

== Yohannan's patriarchate ==
The following account of Yohannan's patriarchate is given by Bar Hebraeus:

After Eliya I, the elderly Yohannan bar Targhal, bishop of Qasr, was consecrated catholicus of the Nestorians at Baghdad, on the third Sunday of the Annunciation, in the eighth month of the Arabs in the year 441 [AD 1049/50]. Because the Greek Palace had been destroyed in the time of his predecessor and the patriarchal cell had also been pillaged, he set himself to build a new cell at his own expense and with the help of the faithful. But six years later troops from Khorasan entered Baghdad, and the eastern suburbs, including the Greek Palace and the patriarchal cell, were plundered. He therefore left Baghdad and went to live in the monastery of the Reeds, but later returned to Baghdad. He died in the year 449 of the Arabs [AD 1057/8].

== See also ==
- List of patriarchs of the Church of the East

== Notes ==
Church of the East titles
Preceded by Eliya I (1028–1049)	Catholicos-Patriarch of the East (1049–1057)	Succeeded by Vacant (1057-1064); Sabrishoʿ III (1064–72)
