= Common Christological Declaration Between the Catholic Church and the Assyrian Church of the East =

Signed religious document

The Common Christological Declaration between the Catholic Church and the Assyrian Church of the East was signed in St. Peter's Basilica in the Vatican on 11 November 1994, by Pope John Paul II and Patriarch Dinkha IV. In this document the Assyrian and Catholic churches confessed the same doctrine concerning Christology (the divinity and humanity of Christ):

The Word of God, second Person of the Holy Trinity, became incarnate by the power of the Holy Spirit in assuming from the holy Virgin Mary a body animated by a rational soul, with which he was indissolubly united from the moment of his conception. Therefore our Lord Jesus Christ is true God and true man, perfect in his divinity and perfect in his humanity, consubstantial with the Father and consubstantial with us in all things but sin. His divinity and his humanity are united in one person, without confusion or change, without division or separation. In him has been preserved the difference of the natures of divinity and humanity, with all their properties, faculties and operations. But far from constituting "one and another", the divinity and humanity are united in the person of the same and unique Son of God and Lord Jesus Christ, who is the object of a single adoration. Christ therefore is not an "ordinary man" whom God adopted in order to reside in him and inspire him, as in the righteous ones and the prophets. But the same God the Word, begotten of his Father before all worlds without beginning according to his divinity, was born of a mother without a father in the last times according to his humanity.

They went on to explain each other's formulations of titles for Mary the mother of Jesus, the key to the dispute at the First Council of Ephesus about Nestorianism and the title Theotokos:

The humanity to which the Blessed Virgin Mary gave birth always was that of the Son of God himself. That is the reason why the Assyrian Church of the East is praying [to] the Virgin Mary as "the Mother of Christ our God and Saviour". In the light of this same faith the Catholic tradition addresses the Virgin Mary as "the Mother of God" and also as "the Mother of Christ".

They then recognised each other's formulations as being valid:

We both recognize the legitimacy and rightness of these expressions of the same faith and we both respect the preference of each Church in her liturgical life and piety.

The declaration went on to create a mixed committee for further theological dialogue between the two (now sister) churches. In 2001 this committee drew up guidelines for mutual admission to the eucharist between the Chaldean Catholic Church and the Assyrian Church of the East, overcoming the issue of the lack of words of Institution in the Anaphora of Addai and Mari.

== Significance ==
Both churches consider the meeting when this declaration was signed as "a basic step on the way towards the full communion [being] restored" between them.
