= Shimun XI Eshuyow =

Head of the Chaldean Catholic Church from 1638 to 1656

Mar Shimun XI Eshuyow
- Patriarch of the Chaldeans; Patriarch of the Church of the East
- Church: Chaldean Catholic Church; Church of the East
- See: Qodshanis of the Chaldeans; Holy Apostolic See of Seleucia-Ctesiphon
- Installed: c.1638
- Term ended: 1656
- Predecessor: Shimun X Eliyah
- Successor: Shimun XII Yoalaha

Personal details
- Died: 1656
- Residence: Qodshanis, Ottoman Empire, then later moved to Khosrau-Abad near Salmas, Safavid Empire

Mar Shimun XI Eshuyow was the sixth Patriarch of the Chaldean Catholic Church, from 1638 to 1656.

He succeeded Patriarch Shimun X Eliyah. The seat of the patriarchate of Babylon of the Chaldean Catholic church being in Salmas during his reign.

Mar Shimun XI Eshuyow like his predecessor Shimun X Eliyah was not formally recognized by Rome, after the hereditary Shimun line of Patriarchs was reintroduced by Patriarch Shimun IX Dinkha. Hereditary succession is an unacceptable practice by the Roman Catholic Church.

His successor was Shimun XII Yoalaha (1656–1662).

== See also ==
- Patriarch of the Church of the East
- List of patriarchs of the Church of the East
- List of Chaldean Catholic patriarchs of Babylon

Chaldean Catholic Church titles Church of the East titles
Preceded by Shimun X Eliyah	Patriarch of the Chaldeans; Shemʿon line (Qodshanis and Khosrau-Abad) (c. 1638 – c. 1656)	Succeeded by Shimun XII Yoalaha
Preceded by Shimun X Eliyah	Patriarch of the Church of the East; Shem'on line (Qodshanis and Khosrau-Abad) (c. 1638 – c. 1656)	Succeeded by Shimun XII Yoalaha
