= Shimun X Eliyah =

Head of the Chaldean Catholic Church from 1600 to 1638

Mar Shimun X
- Patriarch of the Chaldeans; Patriarch of the Church of the East
- Church: Chaldean Catholic Church; Church of the East
- See: Salmas of the Chaldeans; Holy Apostolic See of Seleucia-Ctesiphon
- Installed: c. 1600
- Term ended: c. 1638
- Predecessor: Shimun IX Dinkha
- Successor: Shimun XI Eshuyow

Personal details
- Died: c. 1638
- Residence: Salmas, Safavid Empire, then later moved to Khananis near Qodshanis, Ottoman Empire

Shimun X (Syriac: ܫܡܥܘܢ / Shemʿon, died c. 1638) was Patriarch of the Shemʿon line of primates of the Church of the East, from c. 1600 to c. 1638. He is claimed both by the Chaldean Catholic Church and the Assyrian Church of the East. Upon accession to the patriarchal throne, he moved his seat from Urmia to Salmas, and also resided in Khananis near Qodshanis. He succeeded Patriarch Shimun IX Dinkha who was in full communion with the Catholic Church. Unlike his predecessor, who was officially recognized by Rome as the Patriarch of the Chaldeans, Shimun X was not formally recognized by the Catholic Church because his election was based on hereditary principle, reintroduced after the death of his predecessor. Hereditary succession was considered an unacceptable practice by the Rome. In 1616, contacts between patriarch Shimun X and the Catholic Church were initiated, upon arrival of Catholic missionaries to the region. Patriarch composed a profession of faith, that was sent to Rome for assessment. Upon examination, Shimun′s profession was found inadequate, and he was not received into communion with the Catholic Church. Similar attempt was made in 1619, but wit no final conclusion. Because of such complex situation, his legacy was viewed differently along denominational lines, and claimed by both sides. He is considered as pro-Catholic by the Chaldean Catholic Church, and also as non-Catholic by the Assyrian Church of the East.

== See also ==
- Patriarch of the Church of the East
- List of patriarchs of the Church of the East
- List of Chaldean Catholic patriarchs of Babylon

== Sources ==
- Baum, Wilhelm; Winkler, Dietmar W. (2003). The Church of the East: A Concise History. London-New York: Routledge-Curzon. ISBN 978-1-134-43019-2.
- Baumer, Christoph (2006). The Church of the East: An Illustrated History of Assyrian Christianity. London-New York: Tauris. ISBN 978-1-84511-115-1.
- Beltrami, Giuseppe (1933). La Chiesa Caldea nel secolo dell'Unione. Roma: Pontificium Institutum Orientalium Studiorum.
- Benjamin, Daniel D. (2008). The Patriarchs of the Church of the East. Piscataway: Gorgias Press. ISBN 978-1-4632-1105-9.
- Burleson, Samuel; Rompay, Lucas van (2011). "List of Patriarchs of the Main Syriac Churches in the Middle East". Gorgias Encyclopedic Dictionary of the Syriac Heritage. Piscataway, NJ: Gorgias Press. pp. 481–491.
- Coakley, James F. (1999). "The Patriarchal List of the Church of the East". After Bardaisan: Studies on Continuity and Change in Syriac Christianity. Louvain: Peeters Publishers. pp. 65–84. ISBN 978-90-429-0735-5.
- Coakley, James F. (2001). "Mar Elia Aboona and the History of the East Syrian Patriarchate". Oriens Christianus. 85: 119–138. ISBN 978-3-447-04287-1.
- Lampart, Albert (1966). Ein Märtyrer der Union mit Rom: Joseph I. 1681-1696, Patriarch der Chaldäer. Köln: Benziger Verlag.
- Murre van den Berg, Heleen H. L. (1999). "The Patriarchs of the Church of the East from the Fifteenth to Eighteenth Centuries" (PDF). Hugoye: Journal of Syriac Studies. 2 (2): 235–264. doi:10.31826/hug-2010-020119. S2CID 212688640.
- Wilmshurst, David (2000). The Ecclesiastical Organisation of the Church of the East, 1318–1913. Louvain: Peeters Publishers. ISBN 978-90-429-0876-5.
- Wilmshurst, David (2011). The martyred Church: A History of the Church of the East. London: East & West Publishing Limited. ISBN 978-1-907318-04-7.
- Wilmshurst, David (2019). "The Patriarchs of the Church of the East". The Syriac World. London: Routledge. pp. 799–805. ISBN 978-1-138-89901-8.

Chaldean Catholic Church titles Church of the East titles
Preceded by Shimun IX Dinkha	Patriarch of the Chaldeans; Shemʿon line (Salmas and Qodshanis) (c. 1600 – c. 1638)	Succeeded by Shimun XI Eshuyow
Preceded by Non-Catholic line Created	Patriarch of the Church of the East; Shem'on line (Salmas and Qodshanis) (c. 1600 – c. 1638)	Succeeded by Shimun XI Eshuyow
