= Shimun XIII Dinkha =

Head of the Chaldean Catholic Church from 1662 to 1692

Mar Shimun XIII Dinkha
- Patriarch of the Chaldeans; Catholicos Patriarch of the Church of the East
- Church: Chaldean Catholic Church (1662–1692); Assyrian Church of the East (until 1700)
- See: Patriarchial See of Babylon of the Chaldeans (until 1692); Holy Apostolic See of Seleucia-Ctesiphon (until 1700)
- Installed: 1662
- Term ended: 1692 (in the Chaldean Catholic Church); 1700 (in the Church of the East)
- Predecessor: Shimun XII Yoalaha (Chaldean Catholic Church); Eliya IX (Church of the East)
- Successor: Joseph I (Chaldean Catholic Church) (from 1681); Shimun XIV Shlemon (Church of the East)

Personal details
- Died: c. 1700
- Residence: Khosrau-Abad near Salmas, Safavid Empire then later moved to Qodshanis, Ottoman Empire

Mar Shimun XIII Dinkha was Patriarch of the Chaldean Catholic Church carrying the title Patriarch of Babylon between 1662 and 1692. He was in communion with Rome and resided in Khosrau-Abad near Salmas. He was the last in the hereditary Shimun line of Patriarchs in the Chaldean Catholic Church and, like his predecessors Shimun X Eliyah (1600–1638), Shimun XI Eshuyow (1638–1656) and Shimun XII Yoalaha (1656–1662), was not officially recognized by Rome since the Catholic church does not approve of hereditary patriarchates.

In 1692, Patriarch Shimun XIII moved the seat of his patriarchate to Qochanis (modern-day Konak, Hakkari), broke communion with Rome and became Patriarch of the Church of the East. He continued the Shimun hereditary line of Patriarchs in the Church of the East, a tradition that continued until the death of Patriarch Shimun XXI Eshai in 1975.

Patriarch Shimun Dinkha died around 1700 AD and was succeeded in the Church of the East by Shemʿon XIV Shlemon.

Chaldean Catholic Church titles Church of the East titles
Preceded by Shimun XII Yoalaha	Patriarch of the Chaldeans; Shemʿon line (Khosrau-Abad and Qodshanis) (c. 1662 – c. 1692)	Succeeded by Line Ended; Succeeded by Joseph I of the Josephite line of Amid, which was recognised in 1681
Preceded by Shimun XII Yoalaha	Patriarch of the Church of the East; Shem'on line (Khosrau-Abad and Qodshanis) (c. 1681 – c. 1700)	Succeeded by Shimun XIV Shlemon
