= Shimun IX Dinkha =

Head of the Chaldean Catholic Church from 1580 to 1600

Mar Shimun IX Dinkha
- Patriarch of the Chaldeans
- Church: Chaldean Catholic Church
- See: Siirt of the Chaldeans; Urmia of the Chaldeans
- Installed: 1580
- Term ended: c. 1600
- Predecessor: Yahballaha IV
- Successor: Shimun X Eliyah

Personal details
- Died: c. 1600
- Residence: Siirt, Ottoman Empire, then Urmia, Safavid Empire

Mar Shimun IX Dinkha was the fourth Patriarch of the Chaldean Catholic Church, from 1580 to c.1600.

He moved the seat of the patriarchate of Babylon of the Chaldean Catholic church from Siirt in the Ottoman Empire to Urmia in the Safavid Empire, whereas his successor Shimun X Eliyah moved it to Salmas.

Mar Shimun IX Dinkha was the last Patriarch of the Shemʿon line to be formally recognized by Rome. He reintroduced the hereditary succession, an unacceptable practice by Roman Catholic Church.

His hereditary line of successors Shimun X Eliyah (c. 1600–1638), Shimun XI Eshuyow (1638–1656), Shimun XII Yoalaha (1656–1662) and Shimun XIII Dinkha (1662–1692) resided all in Salmas and were not recognized by Rome.

Shimun XIII Dinkha moved the See to Qochanis in the Ottoman Empire and from 1692 became Patriarch of the Church of the East continuing the Shemʿon line there.

== See also ==
- List of Chaldean Catholic Patriarchs of Babylon

Chaldean Catholic Church titles
Preceded by Yahballaha IV	Patriarch of the Chaldeans; Shemʿon line (Mosul) (1580–1600)	Succeeded by Shimun X Eliyah
