= Khosrowabad, West Azerbaijan =

Khosrowabad خسرواباد
- Village
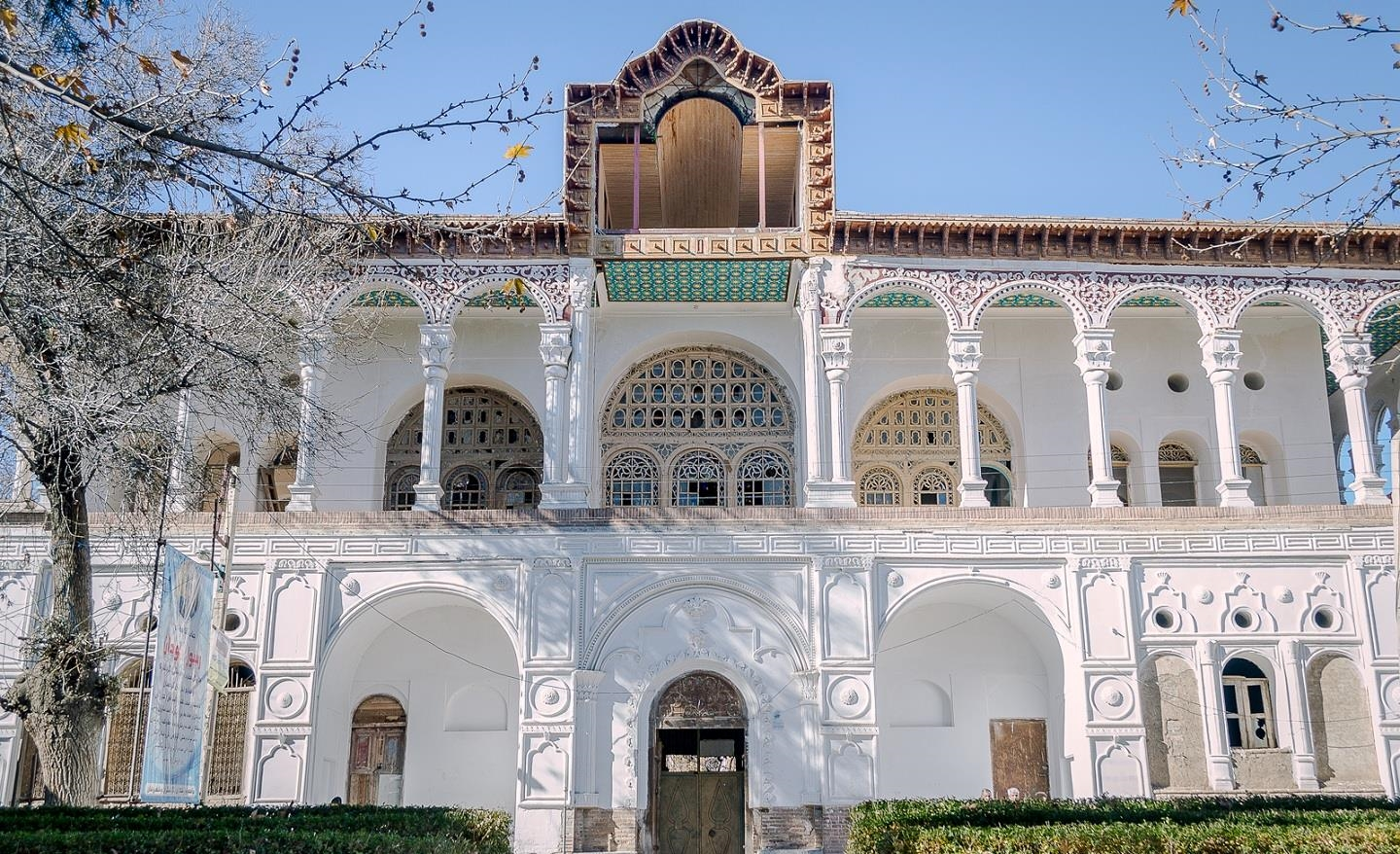
- Khosrowabad mansion

- Location within Iran
- Coordinates: 38°10′00″N 44°44′14″E
- Country: Iran
- Province: West Azerbaijan
- County: Salmas
- Bakhsh: Central
- Rural District: Zulachay

Population (2006)
  - Total: 158
- Time zone: UTC+3:30 (IRST)
  - Summer (DST): UTC+4:30 (IRDT)

Khosrowabad (Persian: خسرواباد, also Romanized as Khosrowābād; also known as Khosrava and Khoskawa; in Armenian: Խոսրովա) is a village in Zulachay Rural District, in the Central District of Salmas County, West Azerbaijan Province, Iran. At the 2006 census, its population was 158, in 44 families. As of 2017, about 60 of the village's residents were Assyrian.

== See also ==
- Assyrians in Iran
- List of Assyrian settlements
- Nicholas I Zaya
