= Heleen Murre-van den Berg =

Dutch university teacher

Heleen L. Murre-van den Berg
- Born: 1964 (age 60–61)

Hendrika Lena "Heleen" Murre-van den Berg (born 1964) is a scholar of Eastern Christianity, who holds a chair in Global Christianity at Radboud University.

She was elected a member of the Royal Netherlands Academy of Arts and Sciences in 2017. She won the 2017 Hans Sigrist Prize.

== Works ==
- Murre-van den Berg, Hendrika Lena (1999). From a Spoken to a Written Language: The Introduction and Development of Literary Urmia Aramaic in the Nineteenth Century. Nederlands Instituut voor het Nabije Oosten. ISBN 978-90-6258-981-4.
- Murre-van den Berg, Heleen (2006). New Faith in Ancient Lands: Western Missions in the Middle East in the Nineteenth and Early Twentieth Centuries. Brill. ISBN 978-90-04-15471-1.
- Murre-van den Berg, Heleen (2015). Scribes and Scriptures: The Church of the East in the Eastern Ottoman Provinces (1500-1850). Peeters. ISBN 978-90-429-3079-7.
