= Chaldean Catholic Eparchy of Mardin =

Diocese of the Chaldean Church

Mardin was a diocese of the Chaldean Church from the sixteenth to the twentieth century. The diocese lapsed in 1941. Prior to this, it was a diocese of the Assyrian Church of the East, from which the Chaldean Catholic Church originated.

== Background ==
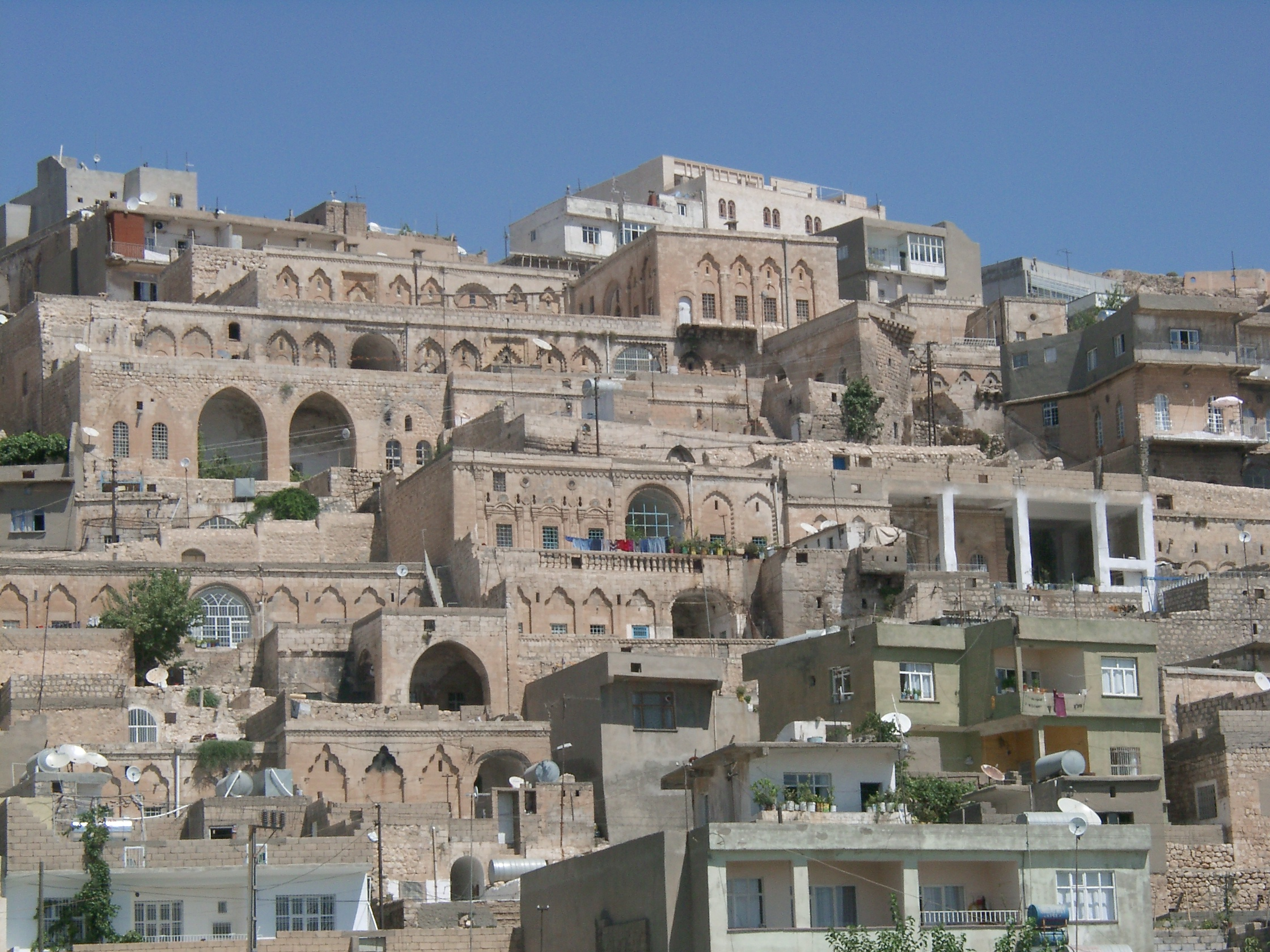
The old town of Mardin

Fiey's list of the Assyrian bishops of Mardin is derived principally from the list compiled by Tfinkdji in 1913. Tfinkdji's treatment of the diocese of Mardin, where he was himself an Assyrian Chaldean Catholic priest, is more than usually detailed, but although containing much valuable information is not free from error. From the middle of the eighteenth century onward, most of the Chaldean bishops of Mardin were buried in the city's church of Rabban Hormizd and the dates of their deaths were recorded in their epitaphs. These dates were used by Tfinkdji, and most of them also appear in an undated note made around the end of the nineteenth century in a manuscript in the Mardin collection, which lists the bishops of Mardin from Basil Hesro (ob. 1738) to Peter Timothy ʿAttar (ob. 1891), giving wherever known the dates of their consecration and death. The author of the note is not known, but may have been Tfinkdji himself, despite occasional discrepancies in some of the dates given. Details of this kind, based on first-hand knowledge and personal recollection, can probably be trusted. Elsewhere, particularly for the early history of the diocese, his evidence is contradicted by other sources, and cannot be relied upon.

The Chaldean diocese of Mardin appears to have been founded in the second half of the sixteenth-century, either by Yohannan Sulaqa or (more probably) his successor ʿAbdishoʿ IV Maron, after Saluqa broke from the Assyrian Church of the East in 1553 AD. Tfinkdji gave the following list of supposed bishops of Mardin from 1194 to 1512, apparently contained in an evangelary copied in 1621: Yaʿqob of Amid (1194–1227); Isaac of Nisibis (1229–51); Marqos of Mardin (1252–75); Denha of Maiperqat (1280–1301); Quriaqos of Dunaysir [according to Tfinkdji the old name of the Mardin village of Tel Armen] (1305–17); Stephen of Mardin (1319–40); Giwargis of Resh ʿAïna (1345–61); Eleazar of Kfartutha (1364–75); Samuel of Edessa (1378–95); Yohannan of Seert (1397–1400); Yahballaha of Gazarta (1400–09); Yalda of Amid (1410–29); Peter of Mardin (1431–45); Sabrishoʿ of Gazarta (1448–68); Eliya of Mosul (1470–86); and Timothy of Hesna d'Kifa (1488–1512).

This list is of very doubtful authenticity. Firstly, although some of its names are plausible, it is surprising to find Assyrian bishops from the West Syriac centres of Resh ʿAïna, Kfartutha and Edessa, and the names Eleazar and Samuel are also rarely found in the Assyrian Church of the East. Secondly, none of the bishops named is mentioned elsewhere. Finally, the list conflicts with other evidence indicating that Mardin was not a separate diocese until after the schism of 1552.

In the literary sources Mardin appears three times in the title of the Assyrian Church of the East bishops of Maiperqat, but not as a separate diocese. The patriarch Yahballaha II (1190–1222) was bishop 'of Maiperqat and Mardin' before becoming metropolitan of Nisibis in 1176; the bishop Yohannan 'of Maiperqat, Amid and Mardin' was present at the consecration of Makkikha II in 1257; and the bishop Ishoʿdnah of 'Maiperqat, Amid and Mardin' was present at the consecration of Denha I in 1265. Furthermore, the dating formulas of manuscripts copied in Mardin in 1502 and 1540/1 mention the patriarch Shemʿon VII Ishoʿyahb and, respectively, the metropolitan Eliya of Amid and the metropolitan and natar kursya Hnanishoʿ. Neither colophon mentions a bishop of Mardin.

The metropolitan Ishoʿyahb of Nisibis, a supporter of Shemʿon VII Ishoʿyahb and his successor Eliya VI (1558-1591), is styled 'metropolitan of Nisibis, Mardin, Amid and all Armenia' in a colophon of 1554, and 'metropolitan of Nisibis, Mardin and Armenia' in colophons of 1558 and 1560. The earlier title may have been intended to challenge the authority of Sulaqa's metropolitan Eliya of Amid, and both styles may be evidence that Mardin was at this period loyal to Shemʿon VII Ishoʿyahb and did not yet have its own bishop.

== The Chaldean bishops of Mardin ==
Mardin was ranked as a suffragan diocese of Nisibis in the list of ʿAbdishoʿ IV Maron in 1562, together with the dioceses of 'Tallescani' and 'Macchazin'. Presumably these were East Syriac villages near Mardin and Nisibis, but they have not been localised.

This reference is of some interest. The first indisputable metropolitan of Mardin was Hnanishoʿ, a native of the Mardin village of Tabyatha, who copied at least seven manuscripts between 1564 and 1586. According to Tfinkdji, he was one of the five bishops consecrated by Yohannan Sulaqa after his return from Rome in 1553 and this may well be true, though Tfinkdji's authority for this claim is not clear. Alternatively, as he is not mentioned before 1564, it is perhaps more likely that he was consecrated by Sulaqa's successor ʿAbdishoʿ IV Maron. He was certainly a supporter of the union with Rome, as the catholicus ʿAbdishoʿ IV is mentioned in the colophon of his earliest manuscript. He also copied a manuscript in the monastery of Mar Yaʿqob near Seert in 1569, the patriarchal residence of ʿAbdishoʿ IV.

Hnanishoʿ was one of the signatories of a letter of 1580 from the fourth Catholic patriarch Shemʿon IX Denha to pope Gregory XIII. In 1582, he visited Jerusalem, where he celebrated the feast of the Resurrection on 15 April. He completed a copy of a manuscript at Mardin on 10 December 1586, and was not among the metropolitans who witnessed the profession of faith of Eliya VI at Alqosh a fortnight later on 23 December 1586. An archbishop Hnanishoʿ 'of Mansuriya', probably the same man, is included in Leonard Abel's 1587 list of 'the most literate men in the Nestorian nation'.

Hnanishoʿ may have died shortly afterwards. Thereafter, until 1615, Mardin appears to have been under the jurisdiction of Yaʿqob, metropolitan of Nisibis. Yaʿqob is mentioned in the report of 1607 as 'metropolitan of Mardin', and in 1614 is styled 'metropolitan of Nisibis and Mardin' in a letter of Peter Strozza.

According to Tfinkdji, the next three seventeenth-century metropolitans of Mardin were Yohannan (1615–41), Joseph (1641–78), and Shemʿon of Amid (1682–95). The source for some of these dates is not clear, and the evidence from the dating formulas of manuscripts is contradictory. The title of Timothy, metropolitan of Amid between 1615 and his death in 1621/2, also included Mardin, suggesting that Yohannan's reign began in 1622 or later. The metropolitan Yohannan of Mardin, said by Tfinkdji to have died in Nisibis in 1641, is mentioned in the dating formulas of manuscripts of 1635 and 1645. The name and (presumably incorrect) reign-dates of the metropolitan Joseph were contained in a note in an East Syriac manuscript copied in 1679 and seen by Tfinkji in a Jacobite church. Shemʿon of Amid is said to have been consecrated by Joseph I, and to have died at Mardin in 1695.

According to Tfinkdji Timothy Maroge, who succeeded Joseph II as patriarch of the Chaldeans in 1714, was metropolitan of Mardin between 1696 and 1713. According to his own account, however, which has been preserved in the Vatican archives, he was metropolitan of Amid, though he also ministered to the Chaldeans of Mardin.

The bishop Basil Hesro of Mardin was one of three bishops (with Basil of Amid and Shemʿon of Seert) consecrated by Joseph III before his departure for Rome in 1731. According to Fiey, following Tfinkdji, he was consecrated in 1714, but in the patriarch's own account the two Basils were consecrated 'one after the death of the other'. Since Basil of Amid died in 1728, Basil Hesro must have been consecrated between 1728 and 1731. He seems to have died in September 1738. In March 1739, the patriarchal administrator Shemʿon Kemo and the clergy and people of Amid and Mardin wrote several letters to Joseph III at Rome to inform him of Basil's death and to plead for Joseph's return. These letters state that he died on 26 September 1738 and mention that he had been appointed patriarchal vicar by the Sacred Congregation. He was the first bishop of Mardin to be buried in the church of Rabban Hormizd, and according to his epitaph in the church died on 25 September 1738, a day earlier than the date given in the Vatican correspondence. A note in a manuscript in the Diyarbakr collection gives the date of his death as 10 January 1739, probably incorrectly.

Basil Hesro was succeeded shortly after his death by the priest Yohannan of Mardin, who was consecrated by Joseph III and also took the name Basil in honour of his predecessor (Tfinkdji). He cannot have been consecrated in 1738, as Tfinkdji stated, as Joseph III only returned to Amid at the end of 1741. He is probably to be identified with the 95-year-old metropolitan of Mardin mentioned by Cardinal Tamburini at the beginning of 1757 as the sole surviving Catholic bishop in the Amid patriarchate (following the recent deaths of the patriarch Joseph III and the metropolitan Timothy Masaji of Amid). He consecrated Laʿzar Hindi metropolitan of Amid on 8 February 1857, and according to his epitaph he died shortly afterwards, on 25 February 1758.

Yohannan was succeeded by the metropolitan Shemʿon of Amid, apparently consecrated by Joseph III in 1758. In 1782, he intervened to secure protection for the Syriac Catholic patriarch Michael III Jarweh, who was persecuted by the Jacobites of Mardin after his conversion to Catholicism. According to his epitaph, he died on 19 November 1788.

Shemʿon was succeeded in 1795 by the priest Mikha'il Shawriz of Seert, the brother of the metropolitan Peter Shawriz of Seert. According to the patriarch Yohannan VIII Hormizd, whose account is quoted by the Anglican missionary George Percy Badger, he was consecrated between November 1793 and 14 February 1794 in an irregular manner on the initiative of Augustine Hindi:

All this time I had received no letters from Diarbekir or Mardeen, for it appears that they would not receive the orders of our lord the Pope; on the contrary, Kasha Agostîn went to Sert, where there was a presbyter named Michael. Him he took to one of the Tcawâlakha [Jilu] Metropolitans and got him consecrated Metropolitan, and set him over Mardeen without the consent of our lord the Pope.

Because of the irregularity of his consecration, Mikha'il was excommunicated by the Vatican but was absolved by pope Pius VI in 1795 and confirmed as bishop of Mardin. Tfinkdji, followed by Fiey, gives the date of his death as 3 April 1810.

Mikha'il was succeeded by Ignatius Dashto of Alqosh, a monk of the monaster of Rabban Hormizd, who was born in 1794 and ordained a priest in 1821. According to Tfinkdji, he was consecrated by Augustine Hindi in 1824 but according to another source, he was consecrated in 1827 and died on 12 July 1868. According to Badger, he was consecrated by Augustine Hindi (who liked to style himself Mar Joseph V) along with four other monks and was sent to Mardin to embarrass Yohannan Hormizd:

Mar Yoosef took upon himself to send Mutran Michael to Sert, and Mutran Ignatius to Mardeen, though this latter town had been placed under the jurisdiction of Mutran Hanna by the Pope himself.

Ignatius Dashto was succeeded by Gabriel Farso, who was consecrated in 1870 and died on 27 June 1873. He was succeeded by Peter Timothy ʿAttar, who was consecrated metropolitan of Amid in 1870 and transferred to Mardin in 1873 on Farso's premature death. He died on 1 November 1891, but seems to have been succeeded as metropolitan of Mardin some years before his death by Yohannan Eliya Mellus, c.1887–1908.

A number of manuscripts in the Mardin collection, some of which were later donated to the Vatican, formed part of the personal collection of the metropolitan Yohannan Eliya Mellus in the 1880s.

In 1910, Israel Audo became metropolitan of Mardin, but the 1918 Assyrian genocide eliminated the Chaldean presence in Mardin, and the diocese was abolished after his death in 1941.

== Population ==
The modern day Chaldean population of Mardin is said to include only one family, and they hold the key to the Chaldean Catholic Church of Mardin, which is still maintained but inactive. The Church is now under the control of the Chaldean Catholic Archeparchy of Amida.

=== Historic censuses ===
In 1842, the diocese of Mardin consisted only of the town itself, which had a church, four priests, and 60 Chaldean families (Badger). In 1852 the diocese of Mardin and Nisibis contained 500 Chaldeans (Marchi). In 1867, the diocese contained 2 villages and had a population of 1,000 Chaldeans, served by 2 priests (Martin).

In 1896, the diocese of Mardin had 850 Chaldeans, with a parish for Mardin itself, and four stations, one of which was near Nisibis (Chabot). There were then 3 priests, assisted by a Capuchin house in the diocese.

In 1913, the diocese of Mardin consisted of 1,670 believers, with 6 priests, a church, 2 chapels, 3 schools, and 2 mission stations (Tfinkdji). The majority lived in Mardin itself. There were also small Chaldean communities living alongside much larger groups of West Syriac and Armenian Christians in Midyat, Nisibis, Derik, Viransehir, and the village of Tel Armen. The only significant Chaldean settlement left in the vicinity of Mardin was the village of Issadeir, several miles to the north.

Chaldean communities in the diocese of Mardin, 1913

Name of Village	Name in Syriac	Number of Believers	Number of Priests	Number of Churches	Name of Village	Name in Syriac	Number of Believers	Number of Priests	Number of Churches
Mardin	ܡܪܕܝܢ	1,100	4	1	Tel Armen		100	0	0
Nisibis	ܢܨܝܒܝܢ	160	1	0	Viransehir		90	0	0
Midyat	ܡܕܝܕ	180	1	0	Derik		40	0	0

In 2005 the Chaldean Catholic Church was reopened, and served 5 Chaldean families. Due to the absence of a Chaldean Catholic priest, the church is managed by a local Syriac Orthodox priest.

== Sources and external links ==
- Baaba, Youel A. (2009). The Assyrian Homeland before World War I. Alamo, California: Youel A Baaba Library. ISBN 978-0-9707489-6-6.
- Badger, George Percy (1852). The Nestorians and Their Rituals. Vol. 1. London: Joseph Masters.
- Badger, George Percy (1852). The Nestorians and Their Rituals. Vol. 2. London: Joseph Masters. ISBN 978-0-7905-4482-3.
- Chabot, Jean-Baptiste (1896). "Éttat religieux des diocèses formant le patriarcat chaldéen de Babylone". Revue de l'Orient chrétien. 1: 433–453.
- Fiey, J.M. (1962). Assyrie chrétienne (3 vols). Beirut.
- Fiey, Jean Maurice (1993). Pour un Oriens Christianus Novus: Répertoire des diocèses syriaques orientaux et occidentaux. Beirut: Orient-Institut. ISBN 978-3-515-05718-9.
- Giamil, Samuel (1902). Genuinae relationes inter Sedem Apostolicam et Assyriorum orientalium seu Chaldaeorum ecclesiam. Roma: Ermanno Loescher.
- Martin, Jean Pierre Paulin (1867). La Chaldée, esquisse historique, suivie de quelques réflexions sur l'Orient. Rome: Imprimerie de la Civiltà Cattolica.
- Tfinkdji, J. (1914). "L'église chaldéenne catholique autrefois et aujourd'hui". Annuaire Pontifical Catholique (17): 449–525.
- Tisserant, Eugène (1931). "Église nestorienne". Dictionnaire de théologie catholique. Vol. 11. pp. 157–323.
- Wilmshurst, David (2000). The Ecclesiastical Organisation of the Church of the East, 1318–1913. Louvain: Peeters Publishers. ISBN 978-90-429-0876-5.
