= Patriarch Joseph =

Patriarch Joseph may refer to:

- Joseph (Genesis), one of the biblical patriarchs, Old Testament patriarch
- Saint Joseph, husband of Mary, mother of Jesus, considered a New Testament patriarch
- Joseph of Seleucia-Ctesiphon, Nestorian Patriarch of the Church of the East in 552–567
- Joseph I of Constantinople, Ecumenical Patriarch in 1266–1275 and 1282–1283
- Patriarch Joseph of Moscow and All Russia, ruled in 1642–1652
- Joseph I (Chaldean Patriarch) (reigned in 1681–1696)
- Patriarch Joseph II of Constantinople, Ecumenical Patriarch in 1416–1439
- Joseph II (Chaldean Patriarch), ruled in 1696–1713
- Joseph III (Chaldean Patriarch), ruled in 1713–1757
- Ignatius Joseph III Yonan, Patriarch of Antioch and all the East of the Syrians for the Syriac Catholic Church since 2009
- Joseph IV, Maronite Patriarch, ruled in 1644–1648
- Joseph IV (Chaldean Patriarch), ruled in 1757–1780
- Joseph Dergham El Khazen, Maronite Patriarch of Antioch in 1733–1742
- Joseph V Augustine Hindi, Patriarch of the Chaldeans for the Chaldean Catholic Church in 1780–1827
- Joseph Estephan, Maronite Patriarch of Antioch in 1766–1793
- Joseph VI Audo, Patriarch of the Chaldean Catholic Church in 1847–1878
- Joseph Tyan, Maronite Patriarch of Antioch in 1796–1809
- Yousef VII Ghanima, Patriarch of the Chaldean Catholic Church in 1947–1958
- Patriarch Joseph VIII, Maronite Patriarch in 1823–1845
- Patriarch Joseph IX, Maronite Patriarch in 1845–1854

== See also ==
- Joseph (given name)
- Joseph (disambiguation)
