= Chaldean Catholic Eparchy of Amadiya =

Former Eastern Catholic eparchy in Iraq (1785–2013)

Amadiya and the surrounding areas, at the beginning of the 20th century

Chaldean Catholic Eparchy of Amadiya (or Amadia) was a historical eparchy (diocese) of the Chaldean Catholic Church, until it was united with the Chaldean Catholic Eparchy of Zakho in 2013.

== History ==
The diocese was established on 1785 and named for the hilltop city of ʿAmadiya in northern Iraq.

It lost territory in 1850 to establish the eparchies (dioceses) of Aqrā and Zaku (Zākhō), but on 23 April 1895 it regained territory from the suppressed daughter-diocese of Aqrā, yet on 24 February 1910 it lost territory again to re-establish the eparchy of Aqrā.

In 1913 it included ʿAmadiya city itself and sixteen villages in the Tigris plain near the town of Dohuk and in the Sapna and Gomel river valleys.

On 10 June 2013 it was renamed as Diocese of Amadiyah and Zaku or Amadia and Zākhō, having gained territory from the suppressed daughter-eparchy of Zaku.

== Background ==
There were three main concentrations of East Syriac villages in the ʿAmadiya region: in the Sapna valley to the west of ʿAmadiya, in the Tigris plain around Dohuk, and in the Shemkan district, around the valley of the Gomel river. Before the fourteenth century the Sapna valley was part of the diocese of Dasen and Beth Ture ('the mountains'), which lay to the north of Marga and also covered the Berwari region and the Zibar and Lower Tiyari districts. The villages in the Dohuk district were included in the East Syriac diocese of Beth Nuhadra, whose bishops resided in the small town of Tel Hesh near Alqosh, and those in the Gomel valley in the diocese of Marga, centred on the ʿAqra region. The last-known bishops of Beth Nuhadra and Dasen, Ishoʿyahb and Mattai, were present at the consecrations of Makkikha II in 1257 and Yahballaha III in 1281 respectively, and it is unclear when either diocese came to an end.

No bishops of the ʿAmadiya region are known from the fourteenth and fifteenth centuries. After the schism of 1552 the region remained loyal to the Nestorian patriarch Shemʿon VII Ishoʿyahb, and his opponent Yohannan Sulaqa, the first Chaldean patriarch, was martyred in 1554 after an attempt to win over ʿAmadiya's East Syriac community. Thereafter the region seems to have been claimed by both patriarchates for some decades. A metropolitan ʿAbdishoʿ of 'Koma', probably the Sapna village of Komane with its recently revived monastery of Mar ʿAbdishoʿ of Kom, was among the signatories of a letter of 1580 from Shemʿon IX Denha to pope Gregory XIII, and the Dasen district was claimed by the Qochanes patriarch Shemʿon XI in 1653. On the other hand, a bishop Abraham of Beth Ture ('the mountains') is mentioned among the hierarchy of Eliya VII (1591-1617) in the report of 1610. Given its proximity to Alqosh, it would be surprising to find the region under the influence of the Qudshanis patriarchs, and the surviving manuscripts copied for the Dohuk, Sapna and Shemkan villages (some originating from Gazarta but the majority from Alqosh) invariably mention patriarchs of the Eliya line. By the end of the eighteenth century the Mosul patriarchate had a diocese of ʿAmadiya for the region.

Patriarch Eliya XII (1778-1804) consecrated his nephew Hnanishoʿ metropolitan of ʿAmadiya in September 1784 after his withdrawal to ʿAmadiya, with the intention of preserving the patriarchal succession within his family. Hnanishoʿ made a Catholic profession of faith in 1795, but was felt by the Latin missionaries to be insincere. In 1801 the Vatican informed them that he could not be received as a bishop in the Catholic Church without 'manifest signs of penitence'. Shortly afterwards in the same year Hnanishoʿ openly defied the Vatican, consecrating the priest Peter Shawriz metropolitan of Seert.

Hnanishoʿ seems to have become reconciled with Yohannan Hormizd after the death of Eliya XII in 1804, as in 1808 he was living in his household in Alqosh. He was 'senior to Yohannan, and governed the diocese of ʿAmadiya, but all the same could do nothing without the approval of the metropolitan Yohannan'. Although he sympathised with Gabriel Dambo's monastic order, his dependence on Yohannan Hormizd occasionally forced him to act against his better judgement. In 1808 he asserted himself by delivering the monastery of Rabban Hormizd to Gabriel Dambo in defiance of Yohannan Hormizd's wishes. In 1811, however, on Yohannan Hormizd's instructions, he 'became a Nestorian at ʿAmadiya' and expelled Dambo and his monks from the monastery with the assistance of the civil authorities. In 1813 he fell mortally ill, and made amends for his harsh treatment of the monks on his deathbed by returning the keys of the monastery to them. He died shortly afterwards and was buried in the monastery of Rabban Hormizd, 'among the tombs of the patriarchs of the Nestorians'.

== Chaldean bishops of Amadiya ==
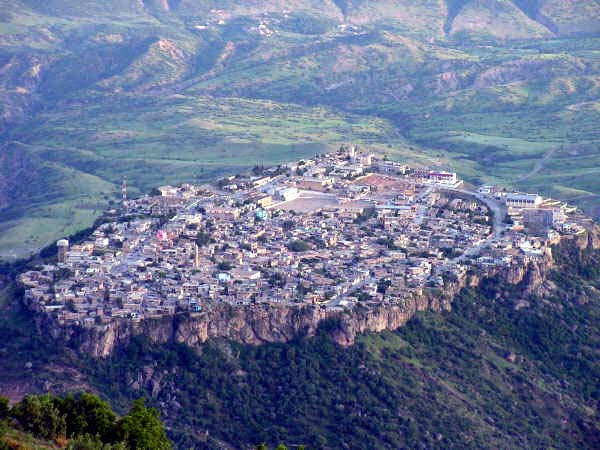
The hilltop city of ʿAmadiya, overlooking the Sapna river valley

Some years earlier a Catholic diocese had been established in the region with the consecration by Yohannan Hormizd of his nephew Mattai Shemʿon for ʿAmadiya on 5 May 1790. Shemʿon, originally named Yohannan, was the son of Yohannan's brother the priest Giwargis, and appears to have been consecrated on the suggestion of the missionary Maurizio Cherzoni. There is no need to doubt the sincerity of Yohannan Hormizd's commitment to the Catholic faith at this period, but the appointment was of course also directed against his rival Eliya XII (1778-1804). After his consecration Shemʿon made a determined effort to convert a number of villages in the Sapna plain and the Zibar district to Catholicism. He was killed by brigands not far from the Great Zab in 1811.

Basil Asmar of Telkepe, a monk of the monastery of Rabban Hormizd, was consecrated for ʿAmadiya at Amid by the patriarchal administrator Augustine Hindi in April 1824, but seems to have had no contact with his diocese. He resided in his home village of Telkepe until 1827, apparently in fear of the governor of ʿAmadiya, known to be a friend of Yohannan Hormizd, and in 1827 fled to Amid, becoming its metropolitan in 1828.

Basil Asmar was succeeded as metropolitan of ʿAmadiya in 1830 by the energetic Joseph Audo, who was transferred from Mosul to the diocese of ʿAmadiya under the settlement which confirmed Yohannan VIII Hormizd as patriarch and ended the schism in the Chaldean Church. During his metropolitanate Audo converted many of the villages of the Sapna valley to Catholicism. After he became patriarch in 1848 he was succeeded as metropolitan of ʿAmadiya in 1851 by ʿAbdishoʿ Thomas Dirsho, a monk of the monastery of Rabban Hormizd, who died in 1859.

The future patriarch ʿAbdishoʿ Giwargis Khayyat became bishop of ʿAmadiya in 1860. He was succeeded in 1874 by Mattai Paul Shamina, who exchanged dioceses in 1879 with Quriaqos Giwargis Goga, bishop of Zakho, who resigned in 1893. Eliya Joseph Khayyat was elected for ʿAmadiya in 1893, but at the synod of Alqosh in 1894 the newly elected patriarch ʿAbdishoʿ V Khayyat asked to retain him as his patriarchal vicar. As a result, the dioceses of ʿAmadiya and ʿAqra were temporarily united under Yaʿqob Yohannan Sahhar, bishop of ʿAqra, who was responsible for the united diocese from 23 April 1895 until his death in 1909.

He was succeeded as bishop of ʿAmadiya by Francis Daoud of Araden (the only nineteenth-century Chaldean bishop from the ʿAmadiya region), who had been Sahhar's vicar-general for several years previously. He was consecrated for ʿAmadiya on 15 August 1910, resided in the Sapna village of Araden, and remained bishop of ʿAmadiya until his death in 1939.

Francis Daoud's successors were Yohannan Qoryo (1942–6), Raphael Rabban (1947–57), Raphael Bidawid (1957–66), Andrew Sana (1966–7), Quriaqos Musa (1967–8), and Yohannan Qello (1973–2001).

In December 2001 the elderly bishop Yohannan Qello of ʿAmadiya, who died on 7 September 2002, was succeeded by Rabban Al-Qas. Rabban Al-Qas was also apostolic administrator of the Chaldean archdiocese of Erbil, vacant since the death of Yaʿqob Denha Scher in 2005, until the appointment of Bashar Warda in 2010.

In July 2013, the Chaldean diocese of Amadiya was united with the vacant diocese of Zakho. Currently Raban al-Qas is the Bishop of Zakho and Amadiya.

== Population statistics ==
In modern times Assyrians (Including Chaldean groups) comprise 30% of the Amadiya District, and 3,500+ Chaldean people are recorded in the Zakho District according to old Church Records from before the merger. After the merger the combined diocese population is 18,500 in 2015.

In 1850 the diocese of ʿAmadiya included the towns of Dohuk and ʿAmadiya and fourteen villages, all but one either around Dohuk or in the Gomel and Sapna valleys, and contained 466 Chaldean families, with 8 priests and 14 churches (Badger). The diocese also included at this period the Catholic communities in Herpa and Barzane, and probably other villages in the ʿAqra region.

In the 1850s Dohuk and several villages in the Dohuk district and ʿAqra region were transferred to the new dioceses of Zakho and ʿAqra. The reduced diocese of ʿAmadiya contained 6,020 Chaldeans, with 10 priests, in 1867 (Martin); and 3,000 Chaldeans, with 13 priests and 16 churches, in 1896 (Chabot). In 1913 the diocese included ʿAmadiya and sixteen villages, most of them in the Sapna and Gomel valleys, and contained 4,970 Chaldeans, with 19 priests and 10 churches (Tfinkdji).

A recently published book by Youel Baaba has supplied the Syriac names of the villages in the diocese of ʿAmadiya.

Chaldean communities in the diocese of ʿAmadiya, 1913

Name of Village	Name in Syriac	Number of Believers	Number of Priests	Number of Churches	Name of Village	Name in Syriac	Number of Believers	Number of Priests	Number of Churches
Amadiya	ܥܡܝܕܝܐ	400	2	0	Meze	ܡܝܙܐ	100	1	1
Araden	ܐܪܥܕܢ	650	2	1	Bebozi	ܒܒܘܙܐ	120	0	0
Mangesh	ܡܢܓܝܫܐ	1,100	4	1	Adeh	ܐܕܚ	300	1	0
Dawodiya	ܕܘܘܕܝܐ	300	1	1	Harmashe	ܗܪܡܫܐ	310	1	1
Tineh	ܬܢܐ	450	2	1	Tella	ܬܠܐ	340	1	1
Inishk	ܐܝܢܫܟܐ	250	1	1	Birta	ܒܝܪܬܐ	60	0	0
Hamziyya	ܗܡܙܝܐ	200	1	1	Dizzi	ܕܙܐ	80	0	0
Komane	ܟܘܡܢܐ	60	0	0	Tel Hesh	ܬܠ ܗܝܫ	100	1	1
Beth ʿAinatha	ܒܝܬ ܥܝܢܬܐ	150	1	0	Total		4,970	19	10

Tfinkdji mentioned that the diocese contained about 4,000 'Nestorians' in 1913, a figure not much smaller than its Chaldean population. This is a remarkably high figure for the Sapna and Shemkan villages, exposed to Catholic influence for over a century; and as Chabot did not mention a substantial traditionalist population in the diocese in 1896, it probably included the population of the East Syriac villages in the Berwari region, perhaps considered nominally part of the diocese of ʿAmadiya after the conversion of the traditionalist bishop Ishoʿyahb of Berwari in 1903.

== Sources ==
- Baaba, Youel A. (2009). The Assyrian Homeland before World War I. Alamo, California: Youel A Baaba Library. ISBN 978-0-9707489-6-6.
- Badger, George Percy (1852). The Nestorians and Their Rituals. Vol. 1. London: Joseph Masters.
- Badger, George Percy (1852). The Nestorians and Their Rituals. Vol. 2. London: Joseph Masters. ISBN 978-0-7905-4482-3.
- Baum, Wilhelm; Winkler, Dietmar W. (2003). The Church of the East: A Concise History. London-New York: Routledge-Curzon. ISBN 978-1-134-43019-2.
- Baumer, Christoph (2006). The Church of the East: An Illustrated History of Assyrian Christianity. London-New York: Tauris. ISBN 978-1-84511-115-1.
- Chabot, Jean-Baptiste (1896). "Éttat religieux des diocèses formant le patriarcat chaldéen de Babylone". Revue de l'Orient chrétien. 1: 433–453.
- Fiey, J.M. (1962). Assyrie chrétienne (3 vols). Beirut.
- Fiey, Jean Maurice (1993). Pour un Oriens Christianus Novus: Répertoire des diocèses syriaques orientaux et occidentaux. Beirut: Orient-Institut. ISBN 978-3-515-05718-9.
- Giamil, Samuel (1902). Genuinae relationes inter Sedem Apostolicam et Assyriorum orientalium seu Chaldaeorum ecclesiam. Roma: Ermanno Loescher.
- Martin, Jean Pierre Paulin (1867). La Chaldée, esquisse historique, suivie de quelques réflexions sur l'Orient. Rome: Imprimerie de la Civiltà Cattolica.
- Tfinkdji, Joseph (1914). "L' église chaldéenne catholique autrefois et aujourd'hui". Annuaire Pontifical Catholique. 17: 449–525.
- Tisserant, Eugène (1931). "L'Église nestorienne". Dictionnaire de théologie catholique. Vol. 11. Paris: Letouzey et Ané. pp. 157–323.
- Wilmshurst, David (2000). The Ecclesiastical Organisation of the Church of the East, 1318–1913. Louvain: Peeters Publishers. ISBN 978-90-429-0876-5.
- Wilmshurst, David (2011). The Martyred Church: A History of the Church of the East. London: East & West Publishing Limited. ISBN 978-1-907318-04-7.
