= Patriarch Joseph II =

Patriarch Joseph II may refer to:

- Patriarch Joseph II of Constantinople, Ecumenical Patriarch in 1416–1439
- Joseph II (Chaldean Patriarch) (ruled in 1696–1713)
- Pope Joseph II of Alexandria, Pope of Alexandria & Patriarch of the See of St. Mark in 1946–1956
