= Yohannan Gabriel =

- Bishop of Salmas
- Church: Chaldean Catholic Church
- Appointed: 1795

Orders
- Ordination: 1795 (Priest)
- Consecration: 8 Nov 1795 (Bishop) by Yohannan Hormizd

Personal details
- Born: 1758 Khosrowa
- Died: 15 July 1833 (aged 74–75)

Ishoʿyahb Ishaʿya Yohannan Gabriel (or Jean Guriel, 1758–1833) was bishop of Salmas of the Chaldean Catholic Church from 1795 to his death.

== Life ==
Isho'yahb Gabriel was born in Khosrowa in 1758 and educated at the College of the Propaganda, which he entered in 1773. He was ordained a priest early in 1795, taking the name Yohannan. In the same year he was appointed metropolitan of Salmas and he was consecrated a bishop at Baghdad on 8 November 1795 by Yohannan Hormizd (then metropolitan of Mosul), on the instructions of the Vatican.

His appointment was resisted by a party in the Salmas district, who wanted as their bishop the priest Isaac, a nephew of the late metropolitan Ishoʿyahb Shemʿon. They sent Isaac to the Nestorian patriarch Shemʿon XVI Yohannan, who consecrated him bishop of Salmas at Qudshanis, giving him the name Ishoʿyahb Melchisedec. Eventually, following an approach by Yohannan Hormizd to the Persian authorities, Ishoʿyahb Gabriel was able to assert his authority and administer his diocese without opposition. As metropolitan of Salmas he was recognised as vicar with jurisdiction over the Mar Thoma Christians of Malabar by the Vatican in 1801.

On 8 September 1804, on instructions from the Vatican, he consecrated Augustine Hindi metropolitan of Amid and patriarchal administrator in Mardin. According to Yohannan's nephew Joseph Guriel, followed by Tfinkdji, Yohannan Guriel died on 15 July 1833. According to his epitaph in the cemetery of Khosrowa, however, whose inscription styles him 'Mar Yohannan, metropolitan of Khosrowa, son of Jonas', he died on 13 July 1832.
