= Nicholas I Zaya =

Head of the Chaldean Catholic Church from 1839 to 1847

- Patriarch of Babylon of the Chaldeans
- Church: Chaldean Catholic Church
- Archdiocese: Babylon
- See: Babylon of the Chaldeans
- Installed: 1839
- Term ended: May 1847
- Predecessor: Yohannan Hormizd
- Successor: Joseph VI Audo

Orders
- Consecration: 1836 (Bishop) by Yohannan Hormizd

Personal details
- Born: Nicholas Zaya
- Died: 1855 Khosrowa
- Residence: Iraq

Mar Nicholas I Zaya (or Eshaya) was the patriarch of the Chaldean Catholic Church from 1839 to 1847. He succeeded Yohannan VIII Hormizd, the last of the Mosul patriarchs who traced their descent from Eliya VI (1558–1591), and his elevation ended four centuries of hereditary succession in the Eliya line. After Zaya's accession the Vatican attempted to reform abuses within the Chaldean Church, but its interference was strenuously resisted by several Chaldean bishops. As a result, Zaya's short reign was plagued by one crisis after another. In 1846, after the Vatican conspicuously failed to support him against his recalcitrant bishops, he resigned the patriarchate and retired to his native town of Khosrowa, where he died in 1855. He was succeeded by Joseph VI Audo, one of his most determined opponents.

== Early years ==
Zaya was born in Khosrowa (Syriac: ܟܘܣܪܒܐܕ), a village near Salmas in the Urmia region of Persia. In his youth he studied for several years at the College of the Propaganda in Rome. According to the missionary Sheil, who met him in Dilman in 1836, Zaya studied at the Propaganda for fifteen years and was an outstanding scholar.

He was ordained a priest c.1830, and was consecrated coadjutor bishop of Salmas in 1836 by the Chaldean patriarch Yohannan Hormizd.

== Succession to the patriarchate ==
On 13 October 1837, conscious that he had not long to live, Yohannan Hormizd designated as coadjutor and 'guardian of the throne' Gregory Peter di Natale, metropolitan of Gazarta, presumably with the intention of excluding his nephew Eliya from the patriarchal dignity. However, he did not promise the succession to his coadjutor, and in a bull of 25 September 1838 the Vatican appointed Nicholas Zaya Yohannan's coadjutor, with the right of succession. The main reason for the Vatican's intervention was to ensure that the hereditary principle, first introduced into the Church of the East in the fifteenth century, would play no part in the selection of the next patriarch. The bull mentioned Yohannan Hormizd's growing infirmity and the desirability of avoiding inconvenience and harm should the patriarchate suddenly become vacant. As a Persian by birth, Zaya could lay claim to the protection of the foreign consuls in Turkey. He had also been educated at the Propaganda, and it was hoped that after Yohannan's death he would loyally implement Vatican policy. The bull of appointment arrived in Mosul after the death of Yohannan Hormizd, thus Nicholas Zaya became patriarch in 1839 and was confirmed by the pope on April 27, 1840.

The Chaldean metropolitans Lawrent Shoa of Kirkuk, Basil Asmar of Amid, Joseph Audo of Amadiya and Mikha'il Kattula of Seert, angered that they had not been consulted in the choice of Yohannan Hormizd's successor, met in the spring of 1839 in an attempt to elect one of their number patriarch, but were unable to agree. Meanwhile, Zaya retained the support of the Vatican's apostolic vicar, Laurent Trioche, and the metropolitan Gregory Peter di Natale, who wrote to the Vatican denouncing the conduct of the other bishops and requesting an unequivocal show of support for the new patriarch. The Vatican confirmed Zaya's succession on 27 April 1840, and directed the Chaldean bishops to obey him.

== Patriarchate ==
Because the manner of his succession was resented by most of the Chaldean hierarchy, Nicholas I Zaya had throughout his short reign limited control over his bishops. He began by directing Joseph Audo to leave Amid for Amadiya, so that he could properly administer his metropolitan province, but eventually agreed to let him reside at Alqosh. He also, like his predecessor, had to reckon with the intransigence of the monks of the monastery of Rabban Hormizd, and friends of the patriarch said later that he would have closed down the monastery if he had dared. Instead he permitted 45 elderly monks, including the priest Mikha'il, to retire to lay life. This indirect approach so reduced the number of monks that the monastery thereafter lost much of its former influence.

In 1843, after the Nestorian patriarch Shemon XVII Abraham (1820–61) declined to join a Kurdish expedition against Amadiya, the Kurdish emirs Nurallah Khan and Bedr Khan Beg attacked the mountain Nestorians of the Hakkari region of eastern Turkey, with the connivance of the Ottoman authorities. The Kurds invaded the Tiyari, Walto and Dez districts, sacking the Nestorian town of Ashitha and burning most of the villages. About 10,000 men out of a total population of about 50,000 in these three districts were killed, and many women and children were carried off by the Kurds as captives. Mar Shemon's elderly mother was raped and then beheaded, and her murderers threw the corpse into the Zab. Those who survived the massacre, including the patriarch himself, took refuge in Mosul.

The Kurdish attack on the mountain Nestorians had indirect consequences for the Chaldean Church. Early in 1843 an attempt by Zaya to reform the church calendar by adopting the Western date for Easter aroused strong resentment among the Mosul Chaldeans, and provoked a movement, in which the Anglican missionary George Percy Badger was implicated, to depose him and replace him with Yohannan Hormizd's nephew Eliya. Eliya was unwilling to challenge the patriarch's authority, and Zaya's opponents turned instead to the Nestorian patriarch Shemon XVII Abraham, then a refugee in Mosul, urging him to lay claim to the patriarchate himself. Zaya and the French missionaries who supported him complained vigorously to the Turkish authorities, and wrote to the British embassy in Constantinople to protest at Badger's interference. The Turkish government was initially reluctant to intervene, because of Zaya's ambiguous status as a Persian national, and Zaya finally took his cause to Constantinople, where through the influence of the French embassy he obtained a firman recognising the Chaldean church as a separate millet and acknowledging him as patriarch. The Anglican mission was withdrawn from Mosul, and Badger returned to England in disgrace.

After his return from Constantinople in 1845, Zaya did what he could to undermine the influence of the old patriarchal family. Mar Eliya was not allowed to exercise his episcopal functions, and the monks of the monastery of Rabban Hormizd were encouraged to claim a number of strips of property around Alqosh which may once have belonged to the monastery but had for years been considered as possessions of the patriarchal family. The French consul supported these claims, and the disputed lands were awarded to the monastery. According to Badger, 'two hundred and fifty persons were deprived of their patrimony and reduced to beggary through this joint agency.' Badger persuaded the British consul to intervene, and part of the property was eventually restored to its previous owners.

== Resignation and death ==
The intrigues against Zaya continued into 1846. His opponents accused him of embezzling church funds, which he had in fact used to restore the monastery of Mar Giwargis near Mosul, and spread rumours, 'generally believed to be without foundation', according to Badger, of immoral conduct. As a result, he was summoned to Rome by the Vatican authorities for these allegations to be investigated. He refused to obey the summons, and left Mosul for his native village of Khosrowa, where he resigned the patriarchate in May 1847. He remained in Khosrowa until his death in 1855.

== Notes ==
Catholic Church titles
Preceded by Yohannan VIII Hormizd (1830–1838)	Patriarch of Babylon of the Chaldean Catholic Church; 1839–1846	Succeeded by Joseph VI Audo (1847–1878)
