= Joseph (disambiguation) =

Joseph is a masculine given name.

Joseph may also refer to:

== Religion ==
- Joseph (Genesis), an important figure in the Bible's Book of Genesis
  - Joseph in Islam, an important figure in Islam mentioned in the Qur'an
- Saint Joseph, a figure in the gospels who was married to Mary, Jesus' mother, and was Jesus' legal father
- Joseph (Book of Mormon), a priest and a younger brother of the Prophets Nephi and Jacob
- Joseph (Dean of Armagh), Dean of Armagh in 1257
- Joseph of Panephysis, Egyptian Christian monk who lived around the 4th and 5th centuries
- Joseph (Nestorian patriarch), Patriarch of the Church of the East from 552 to 567

== Places ==
=== United States ===
- Joseph, Idaho, a ghost town
- Joseph, Oregon, a city
- Joseph, Utah, a town
- Joseph Canyon, in Oregon and Washington
- Joseph City, Arizona, an unincorporated community
- Joseph Peak, Yellowstone National Park, Montana

== Arts and entertainment ==
- Joseph (opera), by the French composer Étienne Méhul
- Joseph (1995 film), a German/Italian/American television movie from 1995, which tells the story of Joseph in the Hebrew Bible
- Prophet Joseph (TV series), an Iranian TV series
- Joseph (2018 film), a 2018 Indian Malayalam-language film
- Joseph: Beloved Son, Rejected Slave, Exalted Ruler, a 2015 direct-to-video animated film
- Joseph: King of Dreams, a 2000 direct-to-video animated musical film
- Joseph (comics), a Marvel Comics character who was briefly a member of the X-Men
- Joseph, a member of the Saint Shields in the animated series Beyblade: V-Force
- Joseph (band), a vocal trio from Oregon
- Joseph and the Amazing Technicolor Dreamcoat, a 1968 musical by Tim Rice and Andrew Lloyd Webber
- Joseph Joestar, a fictional character from JoJo's Bizarre Adventure
- Joseph Korso, a fictional character from the 2000 animated film Titan A.E.

== Other uses ==
- Joseph (surname)
- Joseph, a given name form Joseph in Hebrew Bible
- Chief Joseph (1840-1904), chief of the Nez Perce during the Nez Perce War between his people and the US Army in 1877
- Joseph (fashion brand), a retailer founded by Joseph Ettedgui
- Joseph, the formal name of Big Joe, a church bell
- Joseph (art model), art model in France

== See also ==
- Joseph Joseph, an English houseware manufacturer founded in 2003
- Joseph & Joseph, an architectural firm founded in 1908 in Louisville, Kentucky
- Saint Joseph (disambiguation)
- Patriarch Joseph (disambiguation)
- YosepH, a 2003 album by Luke Vibert
- Joesef, a Scottish singer
