= Samuel Giamil =

Samuel Giamil (1847–1917) (Arabic: شموئيل جميل, romanized: Shmuʾel Jamīl) was an Assyrian scholar, polyglot and a Chaldean Catholic monk. He was the superior of the Monastery of Notre Dame des Semences near Alqosh from 1890 to 1917 and wrote numerous scholarly works in Arabic, Latin, and Italian, and translated and published many important Syriac manuscripts.

== Biography ==
Samuel Giamil was born in Tel Keppe in Ninveh Governorate in Iraq to Shimʿun Jamīl and Farīdeh. Tel Keppe was a predominantly Assyrian Christian town until the Islamic State occupation on 6 August 2014. In 1866 he joined the Monastery of Rabban Hormizd of the Chaldean Catholic Church while Elishaʿ Tīshā was the Abbot of the monastery. In 1869, he accompanied Patriarch Mar Yawsep VI Audo to the First Vatican Council. There he attended college and continued his studies until 1879, when he was ordained a priest. As soon as he returned, he was sent out to serve in the Monastery of Notre Dame des Semences (the lower monastery) near Alqosh. There he established a school in 1880. In 1885 he was sent to the northern regions of Mesopotamia by Patriarch Eliya ʿAbū al-Yūnān as a Patriarchal envoy. For an year, he served as the Vicar of the Chaldean Diocese of ʿAqra. In 1890, he became the second superior of the monastery, succeeding Elisha of Dohuk (d. 1875). In 1892, he accompanied Toma Audo (d. 1918), the Archbishop of the Urmia Archeparchy, to the mountain villages for the purpose of healing a schism that developed in the church. He remained the superior of the lower monastery until his death in 1817. During his tenure he was responsible for substantial renovations in the monastery and has been commemorated in many inscriptions. Both he and his predecessor have been entombed in the monastery. The monastery also houses the tomb of Patriarch Joseph VI Audo.

== Works ==
Giamil wrote a number of books and notably, he has translated a theological book written originally in Syriac by Adam ʿAqraya in the 1610s from Latin back into Syriac. The original Syriac version had been lost. In 1902, he published the "Genuinae relationes", an important and scholarly collection of dealings of the Vatican with the Church of the East between thirteenth and nineteenth centuries. This work has helped to trace the history of the East Syriac Patriarchate and the allegiance of its branches after the schism of 1552. Between 1885 and 1902, he had also been the scribe of several manuscripts, including the text used by Chabot in Life of Rabban Joseph Busnaya of Yohannan Bar Kaldun.

== Selected publications ==
- Monte Singar: Storia d’un popolo ignoto (1900)
- Symbolum Nestorianum anni p. Ch. n. 612 (1901)
- Genuinae relationes inter Sedem Apostolicam et Assyriorum Orientalium et Chaldaeorum Ecclesiam (1902).
