= Joseph Busnaya =

10th century Syriac writer

Joseph Busnaya, in Syriac Yawsip or Yawsep Būsnāyā (?869–979), was an East Syriac monk and mystic in Upper Mesopotamia. His disciple, John (Yoḥannan) bar Kaldun, wrote his biography and incorporated a chapter on his spiritual teachings. It is an important source for the Christian geography of the Sapna valley in the tenth century and contains a wealth of detail about the lifestyle of East Syriac monks of the period.

Joseph was active in the first half of the tenth century. A native of Beth ʿEdraye, near Mosul, he entered the monastery of Rabban Hormizd and later moved to that of Abraham of Beth Ṣayyare in the ʿAmadiyya district. He founded his own monastery in the village of Inishk, which later had to be moved to the top of a hill to protect it from Kurdish raids. Joseph became a critic of the bookish learning traditions of the East Syriac church. He was a skilled copyist of Scripture but in his old age he gave up all writing. John took care of his correspondence (in Arabic). Joseph focused on memorizing. According to John, he memorized all of both the Old and New Testaments and the thirty-three volumes of Theodore of Mopsuestia. He claimed to be able to recite a text after reading it five times. Joseph was reputedly 110 years old when he died on 4 September 979, which would put his birth in 869.

Joseph's feast day is celebrated on the sixth Friday of liturgical summer (thirteenth after Pentecost) in the East Syriac calendar. His biography is known from a copy made at the monastery of Mar Eliya in 1055, although copies were also known among the Saint Thomas Christians of India in the 16th century. In the West it was known only from its mention in the catalogue of Abdisho of Nisibis, but in the 19th century it was translated into French by Jean-Baptiste Chabot from a copy of the Mar Eliya manuscript made by Samuel Giamil.

== Hagiography ==
- Jean-Baptiste Chabot (ed.), "Vie du moine Rabban Youssef Bousnaya", Revue de l'Orient chrétien 2 (1897), 357–405; 3 (1898), 77–121, 168–190, 292–327, and 458–480; 4 (1899), 380–415; and 5 (1900), 118–143 and 182–200.

== Bibliography ==
- Barczok, Ralph (2021). Die Vita des Josef Busnāyā: eine historische Quelle des Nordiraks des 10. Jahrhunderts. Peter Lang. doi:10.3726/b17714. ISBN 978-3-631-83827-3.
- Brock, Sebastian P. (2011). "Yawsep Busnaya". In Sebastian P. Brock; Aaron M. Butts; George A. Kiraz; Lucas Van Rompay (eds.). Gorgias Encyclopedic Dictionary of the Syriac Heritage: Electronic Edition. Gorgias Press. Published online by Beth Mardutho in 2018. Retrieved 13 June 2020.
- Fiey, Jean Maurice (2004). Saints Syriaques. Darwin Press.
- Hofrichter, Peter; Wilflinger, Gerhard, eds. (2004). Syriac Dialogue: Sixth Non-Official Consultation on Dialogue within the Syriac Tradition. Pro Oriente.
- Perczel, István (2018). "Accommodationist Strategies on the Malabar Coast: Competition or Complementarity". In Ines G. Županov; Pierre Antoine Fabre (eds.). The Rites Controversies in the Early Modern World. Brill. pp. 191–232.
- Walker, Joel T. (2010). "Ascetic Literacy: Books and Readers in East-Syrian Monastic Tradition". In Henning Börm; Josef Wiesehöfer (eds.). Commutatio et Contentio: Studies in the Late Roman, Sasanian, and Early Islamic Near East in memory of Zeev Rubin. Düsseldorf: Wellem. pp. 307–346.
- Wilmshurst, David (2011). The Martyred Church: A History of the Church of the East. East and West Publishing.
