= Patriarch Joseph III =

Patriarch Joseph III may refer to:

- Joseph III (Chaldean Patriarch), ruled in 1713–1757
- Ignatius Joseph III Yonan, Patriarch of Antioch and all the East of the Syrians for the Syriac Catholic Church since 2009
