= Elias Mellus =

Turkish prelate

Mar Yohannan Elias Mellus
- Bishop of Mardin
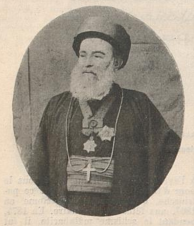
- Church: Chaldean Catholic Church
- Installed: 1890
- Term ended: February 16, 1908
- Predecessor: Peter Timothy Attar
- Successor: Israel Audo

Orders
- Ordination: September 21, 1856
- Consecration: June 5, 1864

Personal details
- Born: September 19, 1831 Mardin, Ottoman Empire
- Died: February 16, 1908 (aged 76) Mardin, Ottoman Empire

Mar Yohannan Elias Mellus (or Milos, Milus) (1831–1908) was a prelate of the Chaldean Catholic Church.

== Biography ==
Elias Mellus was born on September 19, 1831, in Mardin. He entered in the monastery of Rabban Hormizd in Alqosh. On September 21, 1856, he was ordained a priest and on June 5, 1864, he was ordained a bishop in Aqra by Patriarch Joseph VI Audo.

Mellus worked from 1874 to 1882 in the Indian city of Thrissur. On behalf of the Chaldean Catholic patriarch Joseph VI Audo, he looked in vain for the reunification of the Catholic faction of Thomas Christians called Syro-Malabar with their sister church, namely the "Patriarchate of Babylon", as the Catholic successor to the ancient catholicate of Seleucia-Ctesiphon.

The experiment resulted in a schism: some of the followers of Mellus left the Chaldean Catholic Church and joined the Chaldean Syrian Church in 1894/1909. This group gained more than regional significance. In 1968 their metropolitan, Mar Thomas Darmo, opposed Assyrian Patriarch Mar Shimun XXI Eshai and formed the Ancient Church of the East.

In 1882 Mar Elias Mellus was suspended from his office of bishop and returned to Mosul. After some hesitation he fully reentered in the Chaldean Catholic Church in 1890 and was appointed Bishop of Mardin, the position in which he died on February 16, 1908.

== Literature ==
- Eugène Tisserant: Eastern Christianity in India. Longmans, Green and Co., London 1957, 112-119.
- Georg Graf: History of Christian Arabic literature. 4th Bd Apost Bibl. Vaticana, Città del Vaticano 1951, 112f.
- Joseph Habbi: Les Chaldéens et les Malabar au 19e siècle.In: Oriens Christianus 64 (1980) 82-107.
- Wilmshurst, David (2000). The Ecclesiastical Organisation of the Church of the East, 1318–1913. Louvain: Peeters Publishers. ISBN 9789042908765.
