= Monastery of Our Lady of the Seeds, Alqosh =

Chaldean Catholic monastery in Iraq

Monastery of Our Lady of Seeds
- Dair Al-Sayida
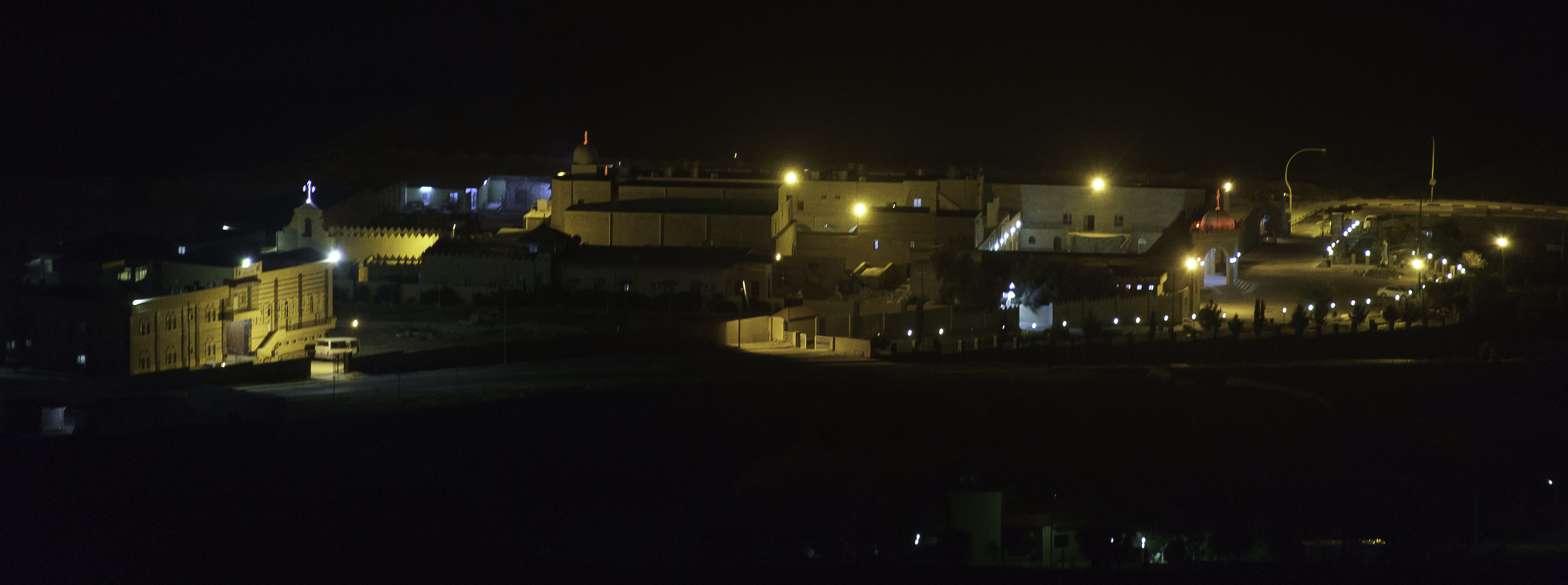
- The monastery as seen from Rabban Hormizd Monastery at night.

- Location within Iraq
- Interactive map of Monastery of Our Lady of Seeds

Monastery information
- Other names: Notre Dame des Semences; Monastery of Saint Mary; The lower monastery
- Order: Order of Saint Hormisdas
- Denomination: Chaldean Catholic Church
- Established: 1858
- Dedication: Saint Mary
- Consecrated: 1858

People
- Founder: Joseph VI Audo

Architecture
- Functional status: Active
- Completion date: 1858

Site
- Location: Near Alqosh, Iraq
- Country: Iraq
- Coordinates: 36°43′56.82″N 43°6′40.26″E

The Monastery of Our Lady of the Seeds, also known as the Monastery of Saint Mary, is a Chaldean Catholic monastery located near Alqosh, Iraq. It was established in 1858 by Joseph VI Audo, Chaldean patriarch from 1847 to 1878. It is located near the very ancient Rabban Hormizd Monastery and has housed numerous important manuscripts.

== History ==
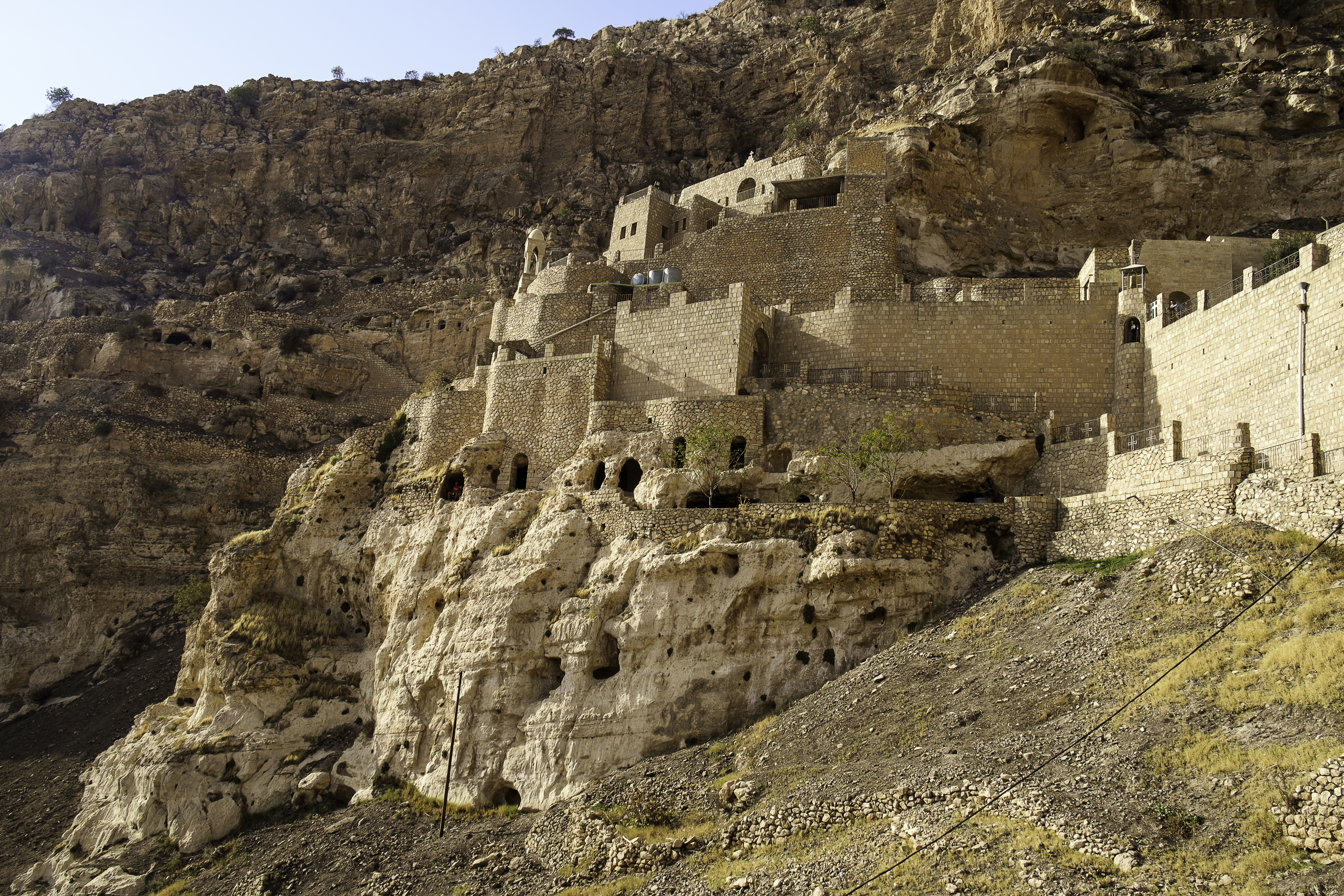
Monastery of Rabban Hormizd

Alqosh, located 28 miles north of Mosul, has been a stronghold of the Church of the East in the Nineveh Plains of Upper Mesopotamia, Iraq. The ancient Rabban Hormizd Monastery was founded about 640 AD, carved out in the mountains about 2 miles from Alqosh. Having been the seat of the Patriarchate for many centuries, it has occupied a prominent place in the history of the Church of the East and the Chaldean Catholic Church. Its position became both geographically vulnerable and historically significant, on the very border of antique Assyria and the former kingdom of Armenia and at the modern-day borders between Iraqi Kurdistan, Turkey and Iran. The geographical location of the monastery on the hills of Alqosh, made it extremely prone to attacks from invaders and nomadic tribesmen. Consequently, it became easy target for the attacks of the Kurds, at the beginning of the Ottoman-Persian War (1743-1746). The monastery was pillaged twice, in 1842 and 1850. This prompted the Chaldean Patriarch Joseph VI Audo (1847-1878) to look for a better and appropriate place for the construction of a new monastery for the monks of the Rabban Hormizd Monastery.

Thus, a new monastery was founded in 1858 on the behest of the patriarch with Vatican assistance in the plain below the mountain which houses the Monastery of Rabban Hormizd. The monastery was dedicated to Saint Mary and named the Monastery of Our Lady of the Seeds (Notre Dame des Semences), or, infrequently, of Our Lady, Protector of the crops or Guardian of the Plants. It was called Notre-Dame des Moissons (Harvest) by J. M. Fiey in his work Assyrie Chrétienne. The monastery also came to be known as the "Lower Monastery" to distinguish it from Rabban Hormizd, the "Upper Monastery". A commemorative plaque in the new monastery mentions that the expense of its construction was borne by Elīsha, the superior-general, and Benedict Planchet, the apostolic delegate in Mesopotamia.

== Gallery ==
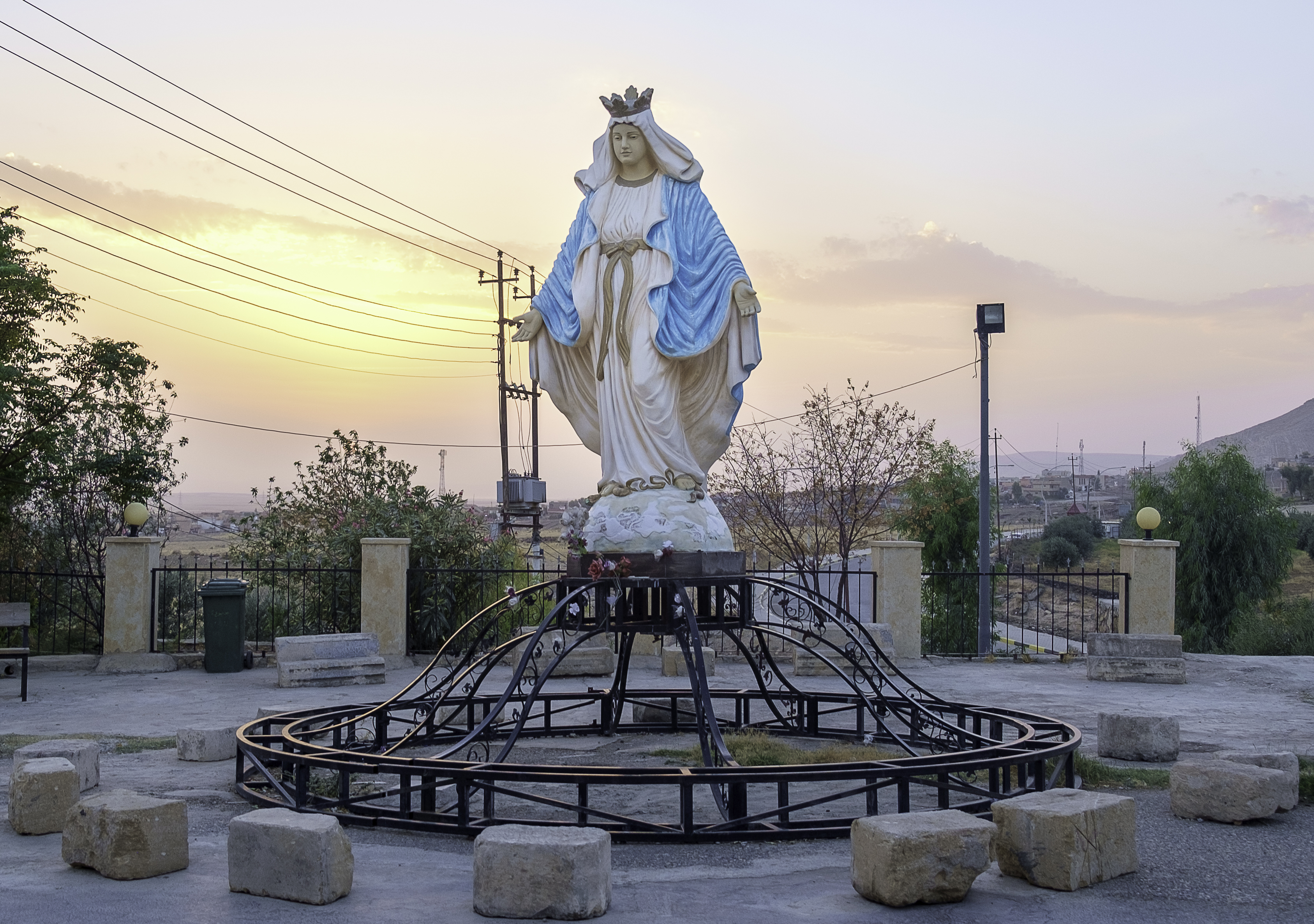
