= Joseph, Idaho =

Extinct town in Idaho County, Idaho

Coordinates: 45°47′50″N 116°28′41″W

Joseph is an extinct town in Idaho County, in the U.S. state of Idaho. The GNIS classifies it as a populated place.

A post office called Joseph was established in 1905, and remained in operation until 1944. The community was named after Chief Joseph, a Nez Perce chieftain.
