= Joseph VI Audo =

Head of the Chaldean Catholic Church from 1847 to 1878

- Patriarch of Babylon of the Chaldeans
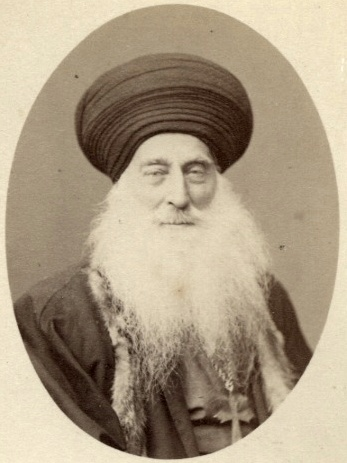
- Church: Chaldean Catholic Church
- Archdiocese: Babylon
- See: Babylon of the Chaldeans
- Installed: July 28, 1847
- Term ended: March 14, 1878
- Predecessor: Nicholas I Zaya
- Successor: Eliya XIV [XIII] Abulyonan

Orders
- Ordination: 1818 (Priest)
- Consecration: March 25, 1825 (Bishop) by Augustine Hindi

Personal details
- Born: Joseph Audo; 1790 Alqosh
- Died: March 14, 1878 (aged 87–88) Mossul
- Residence: Iraq

Joseph VI Audo (or Audu or Oddo) (1790–1878) was the Patriarch of the Chaldean Catholic Church from 1847 to 1878.

== Early life ==
Joseph Audo was born in Alqosh in 1790 and in 1814 he became a monk of the monastery of Rabban Hormizd. He was ordained priest in 1818 and consecrated bishop of Mosul on the March 25, 1825, by the patriarchal administrator Augustine Hindi in Amid. From 1830 to 1847 he served as metropolitan bishop of Amadiya.

In the early 19th century there was not yet a formal union between the two patriarchal lines that professed to be in communion with the Holy See. The ancient monastery of Rabban Hormizd, that for many centuries was the see of the Mama patriarchal family supported by most of the East Syrian Christians, in 1808 recognized as its own patriarch Mar Augustine Hindi, the leader of a patriarchal line started by Mar Joseph I in 1681 in union with Rome. This was fiercely opposed by the last descendant of the Mama family, Yohannan Hormizd, also in communion with Rome. Joseph Audo was a partisan of Mar Augustine Hindi and thus became an active opponent of Yohannan Hormizd: the strong conflict came to an end only through the direct intervention of two apostolic delegates sent by Rome in 1828–1829.

In 1832, he was stripped and insulted by Kurdish troops of Mir Muhammad during a massacre at the Monastery, although he eventually persuaded them to end the attack.

After the death of Augustine Hindi, the Chaldean Church was finally united under the aged Hormizd in 1830, even if he and his successor Nicholas I Zaya had to deal with the internal opposition of several bishops led by Audo that lasted up to the resignation of Zaya in 1846.

== Patriarch (1848–1878) ==
Joseph Audo was elected Patriarch of the Chaldean Church on July 28, 1847, and confirmed by Pope Pius IX on September 11, 1848. He is also remembered as Joseph VI, considering Mar Augustine Hindi to have the name of Joseph V.

Joseph showed himself to be as energetic and combative a patriarch as he had been a bishop. During his reign he took measures to improve the calibre of the Chaldean clergy and to strengthen the episcopate and the monastic order, and mounted a successful campaign to strengthen the spread of the Catholic faith into the Nestorian districts. A sincere Catholic, who had been brought to the Catholic faith after reading Joseph II's Book of the Pure Mirror, he clashed on a number of occasions with the Vatican on questions of jurisdiction.

Audo laid the foundations, with help from the Vatican, for the Chaldean Church to grow and flourish remarkably in the last decades before the First World War. From his early days as bishop of ʿAmadiya, competing with the Nestorian church for the allegiance of the villages of the Sapna valley, he had appreciated the crucial role an educated clergy could play both in consolidating the Catholic faith where it already existed and in bringing it to new hearers. Hitherto many of the Chaldean Church's bishops had been educated at the College of the Propaganda at Rome, and its priests had picked up what education they could from their bishops. Audo worked to reduce the Chaldean Church's dependence on Rome, and to ensure that it was able to train and educate its own clergy.

In doing so he was following in the footsteps of Gabriel Dambo, whose revival of monasticism in the monastery of Rabban Hormizd in 1808 had been partly intended to supply the church with a well-educated and disciplined clergy. To a certain extent it did; monks from the monastery were sent out as priests and deacons to Baghdad, Basra, and a number of Chaldean villages in the Mosul and ʿAmadiya districts in the 1820s, and no doubt served their congregations well. Audo himself and other monks later became bishops. But the first Rabban Hormizd superiors, Gabriel Dambo and Yohannan Gwera, also spent much of their energies quarreling with the patriarchs Yohannan VIII Hormizd and Nicholas I Zayʿa, with damaging consequences for the morale of the church.

=== Establishment of seminaries ===
These internal feuds came to an end with Audo's accession, as he had taken the side of the monastery in its struggles with his predecessors. With the co-operation of the monks assured, the new patriarch did his best to ensure that Dambo's original vision was at last realized. The Monastery of Rabban Hormizd was too remote and exposed to attack to remain a functioning monastery, and was also a symbol of a turbulent time best forgotten. Audo decided to replace it and in 1859, with financial assistance from the Vatican, built a new monastery of Notre Dame des Semences in a safer and more convenient site near Alqosh. The new monastery quickly replaced Rabban Hormizd as the principal monastery of the Chaldean church. Two other important centres for the education of Chaldean clergy were also established at Mosul during Audo's reign, the patriarchal seminary of Saint Peter in 1866 and the Syro-Chaldean seminary of Saint John, completed shortly after Audo's death in 1878. The Syro-Chaldean seminary, which trained priests for both the Chaldean and Syriac Catholic churches, was under the direction of the Dominicans, while the patriarchal seminary was directed entirely by Chaldean clergy. Although a number of Chaldean priests continued to be trained at Rome or elsewhere, most of the bishops and priests of the Chaldean church in the decades before the First World War came from one or other of these three centers founded in Audo's reign.

=== The Rokos affair ===
Despite Audo's energetic investment in the future of the Chaldean church, his relations with the Vatican were often strained. An early sign of the patriarch's independent attitude was given in 1858, when he held a synod from 7 June to 21 June in the monastery of Rabban Hormizd, whose validity was not recognized by Rome. In 1860 a far more serious clash occurred when the Malabar Catholics sent a delegation to Mosul to ask the patriarch to consecrate a bishop of their own rite for them. Despite the protests of the apostolic delegate at Mosul, Henri Amanton, Audo consecrated Thomas Rokos bishop of Basra and dispatched him to visit the Malabar Christians. Amanton thereupon censured the patriarch and his bishops, and Audo responded with two encyclicals to the priests and people of his church, the first on 21 December 1860 and the second on 4 January 1861. Shortly afterwards he departed to Rome to give an account of his actions, arriving at the end of June. He was there invited to recall Rokos, to write a letter of apology to the Propaganda and to make an act of submission to the pope. He complied with the first and third demands, and was received by the pope on 14 September. On 23 September he issued a third encyclical to his church, in which he admitted his mistakes and revoked measures he had taken against the apostolic delegation and the Dominican missionaries. He returned to Mosul on 2 December. Meanwhile, Rokos, who had been excommunicated on the Vatican's orders by the vicar apostolic of Verapoly on his arrival in India, returned in failure to Baghdad in June 1862.

The affair did not end there. One of the members of the reunion which had given Rokos his mission, the metropolitan of Seert Peter Bar Tatar, refused to accept the censures carried by the delegate. The patriarch was again embroiled with the Dominicans, and issued an interdict on all the places where he arrived to celebrate in the presence of the Chaldeans. There was another incident on 5 June 1864. Audo consecrated Elias Mellus bishop of ʿAqra, but the new bishop omitted from his profession of faith passages relating to the Council of Florence and the Council of Trent. This was reported to Rome, and although Audo spoke up for his subordinate and the affair was resolved, animosity grew on both sides.

=== First Vatican Council ===
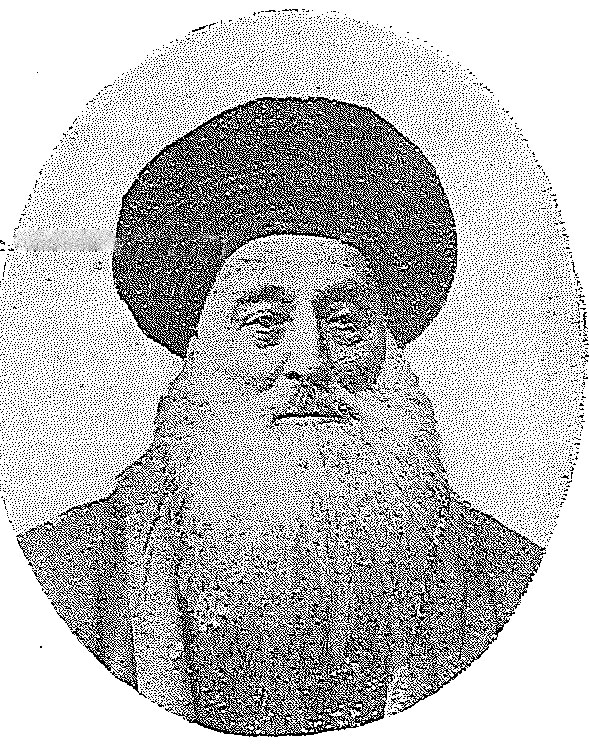
Joseph Audo

The Vatican seems to have decided thereafter to seek every opportunity to remind Audo of his position. In 1867 Gregory Peter di Natale, metropolitan of Amid, died at Rome. The Propaganda invoked the papacy's old privilege in such cases of directly appointing his successor, and asked the patriarch to submit three suitable names after discussion with his bishops. Shortly afterwards the diocese of Mardin also fell vacant with the death of Ignatius Dashto in 1868, and the Propaganda insisted on appointing his successor too. Audo duly submitted a list of seven names, and was directed to consecrate Peter Timothy ʿAttar metropolitan of Amid and Gabriel Farso metropolitan of Mardin. He was also informed that the provisions of the ecclesiastical constitution Reversurus promulgated on 12 July 1867 for the Armenian Catholic Church would in due course be applied to all the Eastern Catholic Churches, and on 31 August 1869 its rules for the election of bishops were applied to the Chaldean Church in the bull Cum ecclesiastica disciplina.

This was too much for Audo, and he refused to consecrate the bishops-designate of Amid and Mardin. He was summoned to Rome and in January 1870 forced to consecrate them. He complained that Rome was infringing the rights of the Eastern patriarchs, and was particularly aggrieved that the Syriac, Maronite and Melkite patriarchs had not yet agreed to accept the provisions of the 1867 constitution. As a result, in the 1870 First Vatican Council he was warmly welcomed as a member of the Church party opposed to the doctrine of papal infallibility, and joined in the opposition to the controversial constitution Pastor aeternus, absenting himself from the session at which it was promulgated. He then refused to adhere to it, giving the excuse that he could only take such a solemn step back home, among his own flock. He met the Sultan in Constantinople on 16 September 1870, and denounced the constitution as infringing on the traditional customs of the church and damaging the interests of the Ottoman Empire. He declared that he had not accepted its provisions and never would. At the same time he celebrated Mass with the Armenian priests who had separated themselves from the patriarch Hassoun, and refused to reply to letters from the Propaganda. The Vatican, alarmed, used every means at its disposal to recall him to obedience and head off a threatened schism. Finally, on 29 July 1872, last of all the eastern patriarchs, Audo wrote a letter accepting the decisions of the council. The Vatican decided to teach him a lesson. In Quae in patriarchatu, a stinging encyclical of 16 November 1872 addressed to the bishops, clergy and faithful of the Chaldean Church, Pope Pius IX rehearsed the many examples of Audo's intransigence, deplored his disobedience and welcomed his eventual submission. Audo's flock was left in little doubt as to who, in the Vatican's eyes, had been in the wrong.

=== The Mellusian schism ===
Audo clashed with the Vatican again in 1874. He asked pope Pius IX to restore to the Chaldean Church the traditional jurisdiction of the Church of the East over the Syrian Catholics of India. The Vatican delayed its response to this request and Audo decided not to wait. He sent Eliya Mellus, bishop of ʿAqra, to India as a metropolitan, where he was promptly excommunicated by the Vatican. On 24 May 1874, without prior consultation with the Vatican, he consecrated Eliya Peter ʿAbulyonan metropolitan of Gazarta and Mattai Paul Shamina metropolitan of ʿAmadiya. On 1 May 1875 he consecrated Quriaqos Giwargis Goga metropolitan of Zakho and Philip Yaʿqob Abraham metropolitan for India, to assist Elıya Mellus. The pope threatened in an encyclical letter of 1 September 1876 to excommunicate both the patriarch and the bishops whom he had consecrated unless they returned to obedience within 40 days. Audo yielded in March 1877 and wrote to recall Eliya Mellus and Philip Abraham from India. He was absolved from censure and commended for his compliance in the papal letters Solatio nobis fuit (9 June 1877) and Iucundum nobis (11 July 1877), and his episcopal appointments outside India were recognized. However, after being deprived of the long-desired bishop Audo had provided them, some of the Syrian Catholics in India broke away in the Mellusian schism to form the Nestorian Chaldean Syrian Church.

=== Final years ===
Joseph Audo died reconciled with the Vatican, in Mosul on March 14, 1878. His obituary was pronounced in a consistory held on 28 February 1879 by Pope Leo XIII, who praised him as "a man adorned with a fine sense of faith and belief" (quem eximius pietatis et religionis sensus ornabat). Although there are no lack of sources for his eventful career, he has not yet had a biographer.

Audo was succeeded as patriarch of Babylon by Eliya Peter ʿAbulyonan, metropolitan of Gazarta, who was elected in 1878 in the monastery of Notre Dame des Semences and confirmed on 28 February 1879 under the title Eliya XII.

== See also ==
- Toma Audo

== Notes ==
Religious titles
Preceded by Nicholas I Zaya (1839–1846)	Patriarch of Babylon of the Chaldean Catholic Church; 1847–1878	Succeeded by Eliya XIV Abulyonan (1878–1894)
