= Joseph IV =

Head of the Chaldean Catholic Church from 1757 to 1796

Mar Joseph IV Lazar Hindi
- Patriarch of the Chaldeans
- Church: Chaldean Catholic Church
- See: Amid of the Chaldeans
- Installed: 25 March 1759
- Term ended: 1796
- Predecessor: Joseph III Timothy Maroge
- Successor: Joseph V Augustine Hindi

Personal details
- Born: Lazar Hindi; 14 September 1726
- Died: 1796 (aged 69–70)
- Residence: Amid, Turkey

Mar Joseph IV Timotheus Lazar Hindi (14 September 1726–1796) was the fourth incumbent of the Josephite line of Church of the East, a patriarchate in full communion with the pope mainly active in the areas of Amid and Mardin. He was considered the Patriarch of the Chaldean Catholic Church from 1757 to 1796.

== Life ==
Lazar Hindi, born on 14 September 1726, educated at the Urban college in Rome, was elected patriarch after the death on 23 January 1757 of his predecessor Joseph III Timothy Maroge. He was consecrated bishop on 8 February 1757 by Yohannan Basil, bishop of Mardin (died 1758), who in turn had been consecrated bishop in 1741 by Joseph III. Lazar Hindi was confirmed patriarch by the Clement XIII on 25 March 1759 and received the pallium on 9 April 1759. He took the name of Joseph (Youssef) IV.

From 1765 to 1768 he went to Rome for printing Chaldean liturgical books and Gospels.

Lazar Hindi coped with the main problem of his predecessors: the tax burdens imposed by the Ottoman authorities on his churches with any kind of pretexts. As his predecessor, in the 1770s he visited the European courts to raise funds but without results.

Back in Amid, dispirited, he resigned in August 1780, appointing as successor his nephew Augustine Hindi. The Holy See accepted the resignation in 1781 but objected to the succession of his nephew. Informed of this, Lazar Hindi withdrew his resignation and remained in Amid.

In 1789 Lazar Hindi was imprisoned by the Turkish authorities for his debt of twenty thousand piastras. He escaped in 1790 and left for Rome. When he arrived in Rome in March 1791, he found that the Vatican was not so interested in his small patriarchate, but was working on possible unions with both the patriarchate of Qochanis, whose patriarch Mar Shimun XV Maqdassi Mikhail in 1770 wrote to Rome to establish contacts, and mainly with the ancient patriarchate of Alqosh, contended by two cousins, one of which, Yohannan VIII Eliya Hormizd, considered himself a Catholic. In 1791 the Vatican had given the government of Amid, the main town of Lazar Hindi's patriarchate, to Yohannan Hormizd. Lazar Hindi vehemently objected, and in 1793 succeeded to have his nephew Augustine returned to be the episcopal administrator of Amid, besides being patriarchal administrator.

Lazar Hindi died in Italy in 1796.

== Sources ==
- Frazee, Charles A. (2006) [1983]. Catholics and Sultans: The Church and the Ottoman Empire 1453-1923. Cambridge: Cambridge University Press. ISBN 9780521027007.

Preceded by Joseph III Timothy Maroge	Patriarch of Babylon; 1757–1780	Succeeded by Joseph V Augustine Hindi
