= Jean-Baptiste Chabot =

French catholic priest and scholar (1860–1948)

Jean-Baptiste Chabot (French: [ʒɑ̃ batist ʃabo]; 16 February 1860 – 7 January 1948) was a Roman Catholic secular priest and the leading French Syriac scholar in the first half of the twentieth century.

== Life ==
Born into a viticultural family at Vouvray-sur-Loire, Chabot trained at the seminary in Tours where he was ordained. Appointed as assistant priest to La Chapelle-sur-Loire in 1885, he served for two years before becoming a student of Thomas Joseph Lamy (1827–1907) at Louvain Catholic University in Belgium. His thesis published in Latin in 1892 was devoted to Isaac of Nineveh and included three unpublished homilies from British Museum manuscripts which Chabot translated.

He then studied at the School for Higher Studies at the Sorbonne, and under Rubens Duval whose collaborator he became. In 1893 Chabot published catalogues of Syriac manuscripts preserved at the Greek Orthodox Patriarchate of Jerusalem and of Syriac manuscripts acquired by the French Bibliothèque Nationale since 1874 (i.e. subsequent to the Zotenberg catalogue). Other catalogues of Oriental manuscripts in the possession of the Eastern Churches were to follow.

An early student of the École pratique des hautes études (founded partly to fill the gap caused by the suppression of the Sorbonne Theology faculty) Chabot worked on the fourth part of the Chronicle of Pseudo-Dionysius of Tell-Mahre, which he published in 1895. Between 1897 and 1900 he published a French translation of John bar Kaldun's Life of Joseph Busnaya.

Four years later he obtained a copy of the original Syriac version of Michael the Syrian's Universal Chronicle, which had been rediscovered in a church at Edessa in 1887 by Ephrem Rahmani, subsequently patriarch of the Syriac Catholic Church. This led to the publication of four volumes of text with Latin translation in 1899, 1901, 1905, 1910 with a follow-up consisting of introduction, corrections and indices in 1924.

In 1903 Chabot founded the Corpus Scriptorum Christianorum Orientalium, which he directed single-handed for ten years, supervising the publication of 70 original texts in the four languages initially planned, i.e.; Syriac, Coptic, Arabic and Ethiopian, and personally editing a series of further Syriac chronicles (including the invaluable Documenta ad Illustrandas Monophysitarum Origines 1908) together with the first part of the surviving Syriac version of Cyril of Alexandria's Commentary on St. Luke's Gospel 1912 and (with A. Vaschalde) James of Edessa's Hexaemeron 1928. Chabot remained Secretary general of the C.S.C.O., though responsibility passed in 1913 to the Universities of Washington and Louvain, throughout his lifetime. He contributed a number of articles to the Catholic Encyclopedia on Semitic and Syriac languages.

In 1917 Chabot was elected a member of the French Académie des Inscriptions et Belles-Lettres.

In 1922 he published Choix d' inscriptions de Palmyre, a major work on Palmyrene Aramaic texts, and in 1935 a general introduction, Littérature Syriaque. He died in Paris, aged 87.

Major works:

- Chabot, Jean-Baptiste (1902). Synodicon orientale ou recueil de synodes nestoriens (PDF). Paris: Imprimerie Nationale.

== Sources ==
- E. Dhorme: «Notice sur la vie de M. L' Abbé Jean-Baptiste Chabot, membre de l'académie», in Comptes rendus des séances de l'Académie des Inscriptions et Belles-Lettres, vol. 96 (1952), pp. 263–277.
