= Joseph III (Chaldean Catholic patriarch) =

Head of the Chaldean Catholic Church from 1713 to 1757

Mar Joseph III Timothy Maroge
- Patriarch of the Chaldeans
- Church: Chaldean Catholic Church
- Archdiocese: Amid
- See: Amid of the Chaldeans
- Installed: 1713
- Term ended: 23 January 1757
- Predecessor: Joseph II Sliba Maruf
- Successor: Joseph IV Lazare Hindi

Personal details
- Born: Timothy Maroge
- Died: 23 January 1757
- Residence: Amid, Turkey

Mar Joseph III Timothy Maroge (or Youssef III Timotheos Maraugin or Maroghin) was the third incumbent of the Josephite line of Church of the East, a patriarchate in Full Communion with the pope mainly active in the areas of Amid and Mardin. He was the Patriarch of the Chaldean Catholic Church from 1713 to 1757.

== Life ==
Timothy Maroge was born in Baghdad and educated by the Capuchin missionaries in Amid. He was consecrated bishop of Mardin by Joseph II Sliba Maruf in 1705.

He became patriarch after his predecessor's death, being the only Chaldean bishop who survived the 1708-1713 plague. He was confirmed by the Holy See on 18 March 1714, and took the name of Joseph III.

During his patriarchate there was a growth in the number of the faithful in the patriarchate, mainly in the area of the Alqosh's patriarchate. Joseph III was a skilful preacher, and it is remembered that more than three thousand people of Mosul entered in his patriarchate in 1723. This success caused a strong reaction of the traditionalist Patriarch of Alqosh, Eliya XII (XI) Denkha, who succeeded in having Joseph III imprisoned many times by the Turkish authorities. Shortly after, some problems arose in Amid, where the traditionalists occupied Joseph's cathedral and the Capuchins left the town in 1726.

The patriarchate struggled with financial difficulties due to the tax burden imposed by the Turkish authorities and to the ransoms required to free Joseph from the prison. Furthermore, according to the Ottoman law, the Chaldean community was administratively subject to the traditionalist Patriarchate of Alqosh, causing it to be in a weak position and exposed to vexations.

In 1734 Joseph left for Europe to try to raise funds to pay his debts, and during the next seven years he visited the Catholic courts of Poland, Austria and Rome asking for financial support. He was given some money, but far less than he had hoped for. While he was abroad, the Chaldeans in Istanbul obtained from the Ottoman authorities recognition of his authority over Amid and Mardin, but Mosul and Aleppo were assigned to the traditionalist patriarchate of Alqosh, thus creating many difficulties for the growing number of Chaldeans who lived there.

In 1754 Joseph appointed as successor Mar Antun Galla, but the Holy See objected and did not allow him to resign: thus he remained the incumbent till his death on 23 January 1757.

== Sources ==
- Frazee, Charles A. (2006) [1983]. Catholics and Sultans: The Church and the Ottoman Empire 1453-1923. Cambridge: Cambridge University Press. ISBN 9780521027007.
- Wilmshurst, David (2000). The Ecclesiastical Organisation of the Church of the East, 1318–1913. Louvain: Peeters Publishers. ISBN 9789042908765.

Preceded by Joseph II Sliba Maruf	Patriarch of Babylon; 1713–1757	Succeeded by Joseph IV Lazare Hindi
