= Joseph V Augustine Hindi =

Patriarchal administrator of the Chaldean Catholic Church from 1781 to 1827

- Patriarch of the Chaldeans
- Church: Chaldean Catholic Church
- See: Amid of the Chaldeans
- Term ended: 3 April 1827
- Predecessor: Joseph IV Lazar Hindi
- Successor: Yohannan VIII Hormizd

Orders
- Consecration: Sept 8, 1804 (Bishop) by Yohannan Gabriel

Personal details
- Born: Augustine Hindi
- Died: 3 April 1827
- Residence: Iraq

Mar Joseph V Augustine Hindi (died 3 April 1827) was the patriarchal administrator of the Chaldean Catholic Church from 1781 to 1827. Since 1804 he considered himself Patriarch with the name of Joseph V and from 1812 to his death he governed both the patriarchal sees of Alqosh and Amid of the Church of the East.

== Life ==
The See of Amid of the Church of the East was since 1681 in Full Communion with the Holy See and formed a little patriarchate including a few towns on the North-West mountains of Assyria, like Amid itself and Mardin, now in Turkey. The patriarchs that ruled over it are usually known as Josephine line, because all of them took the name of Joseph. Augustine Hindi was a nephew of Joseph IV Lazar Hindi, the patriarch since 1759.

In the 18th century this patriarchate suffered a great financial crisis due to over taxation from Turkish authorities, and the patriarch had to travel all over Europe trying to raise funds. Returning to Amid without success, after a few years Lazare Hindi resigned in August 1780 and appointed his nephew Augustine Hindi as patriarchal administrator, without consecrating him bishop.

Rome did not recognize the appointment of Augustine but only the resignation of Lazare Hindi, which was soon withdrawn. Lazare Hindi was imprisoned by Turkish authorities in 1789 and escaped to Rome in 1791 where he died in 1796. The hope of the Vatican was to enter into Communion with the larger patriarchate of the Church of the East, the one with see in Alqosh, at that time divided between the two cousins Eliya Isho'yahb and Yohannan Hormizd, the second of whom considered himself a Catholic.

Thus in 1791 the Vatican appointed Yohannan Hormizd, already metropolitan of Mosul and claiming the patriarchate, also as patriarchal administrator of Amid. The vehement complaints of Lazare Hindi, then in Rome, forced Rome to reach an agreement: in 1793 Yohannan Hormizd withdrew from the see of Amid but Augustine Hindi could not be appointed Patriarch of the Chaldean Church.

In the next years Augustine gained respect for his reliability and endeared himself to the supporters of the Roman cause. Also in the area Yohannan Hormizd ruled, and was his competitor to the title of patriarch.

On 15 January 1802 Augustine Hindi was formally appointed metropolitan of Amid and patriarchal administrator and he was consecrated bishop on September 8, 1804 by Isho'yahb Isha'ya Yohannan Gabriel (or Jean Guriel), then Chaldean bishop of Salmas.

As Augustine gained respect, Yohannan Hormizd was opposed by the Latin missionaries and by the abbot of the revitalized monastery of Rabban Hormizd, the monk Gabriel Dambo of Mardin. After the suspension of Yohannan Hormizd as bishop of Mosul in 1812 because of his clashes with the monks of Rabban Hormizd, Augustine Hindi actually governed almost all the territory of both the patriarchal sees of Alqosh and Amid up to his death with the title of apostolic delegate for the Patriarchate of Babylon.

In 1818 Yohannan Hormizd was suspended also by his office of bishop (for about eight years) and on October 2 of the same year Augustine Hindi received from Rome the pallium. Probably in good faith, Hindi believed that the pallium was the recognition of his title of Patriarch under the name of Joseph V, claimed by him from 1804, and most Chaldeans called him patriarch. Even if never formally confirmed patriarch by Rome, Rome never publicly objected to such a title. In 1824 and 1825 Augustine appointed and consecrated some of his supporters as bishops, such as Joseph Audo on March 25, 1825. Augustine died on April 3, 1827.

== Sources ==
- Frazee, Charles A. (2006) [1983]. Catholics and Sultans: The Church and the Ottoman Empire 1453-1923. Cambridge: Cambridge University Press. ISBN 9780521027007.
- Wilmshurst, David (2000). The Ecclesiastical Organisation of the Church of the East, 1318–1913. Louvain: Peeters Publishers. ISBN 9789042908765.

Religious titles
Preceded by Joseph IV Lazare Hindi	Patriarch of Babylon; 1780–1827; Not recognized as patriarch by Rome, only as apostolic delegate for the Patriarchate	Succeeded by Vacant (1827–1830); Yohannan VIII Hormizd (1830–1838)
