= Yohannan VIII Hormizd =

Head of the Chaldean Catholic Church from 1830 to 1838

- Patriarch of Babylon of the Chaldeans
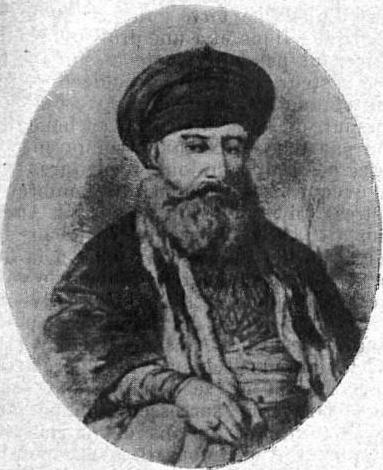
- Church: Chaldean Catholic Church
- Archdiocese: Babylon
- See: Babylon of the Chaldeans
- Installed: 5 July 1830
- Term ended: 1838
- Predecessor: Joseph V as Patriarch of Chaldean Catholic Church. Eliya XII as Patriarch belonging to the Eliya line based in the Monastery of Rabban Hormizd.
- Successor: Nicholas I Zayʿa

Orders
- Consecration: 22 May 1776 (Bishop) by Patriarch Eliya XI

Personal details
- Born: Yohannan Hormizd; 1760 Alqosh
- Died: 16 August 1838 (aged 77–78) Mosul
- Residence: Iraq, Ottoman Empire

Yohannan VIII Hormizd (often referred to by European missionaries as John Hormez or Hanna Hormizd) (1760–1838) was the last hereditary patriarch of the Eliya line of the Church of the East and the first patriarch of a united Chaldean Church. After the death of his uncle Eliya XI in 1778, he claimed the patriarchal throne in 1780 and made a Catholic profession of faith. In 1783, he was recognized by the Vatican as patriarchal administrator and archbishop of Mosul. His career as patriarchal administrator was controversial, and was marked by a series of conflicts with his own bishops and also with the Vatican. Suspended from his functions in 1812 and again in 1818, he was reinstated by the Vatican in 1828. In 1830, following the death of the Amid patriarchal administrator Augustine Hindi, he was recognised by the Vatican as patriarch of Babylon of the Chaldeans and the Mosul and Amid patriarchates were united under his leadership. This event marked the birth of the since unbroken patriarchal line of the Chaldean Catholic Church. Yohannan Hormizd died in 1838 and his successor Nicholas I Zayʿa was chosen by the Vatican, ending the centuries-old practice of hereditary succession.

== Sources ==
Yohannan Hormizd's career, first as patriarchal administrator and finally as patriarch, was dogged by disputes. Most of the surviving contemporary accounts of his patriarchate are partisan, and must be used with care.

Yohannan Hormizd himself wrote a polemical autobiography in Syriac, a fragment of which (breaking off in 1795) was translated into English by the Anglican missionary George Percy Badger and reproduced in his classic 1852 study of the Church of the East, The Nestorians and Their Rituals. His opponents responded with an equally intemperate history of the monastery of Rabban Hormizd under the headship of Gabriel Dambo of Mardin (1775–1832), which was published in a French translation by M. Brière in 1910 and 1911. Both texts provide spirited accounts of the intrigues that followed Yohannan's election as patriarch in 1780. Neither can be trusted on matters of interpretation, but if read judiciously they shed valuable light on the politics of the Chaldean Church in the late eighteenth- and early-nineteenth centuries and provide a wealth of factual detail omitted in many accounts of this period.

The partisan spirit of the contemporary accounts was reflected in the texts of several later Chaldean authors, notably Giamil and Tfinkdji. Stephane Bello, writing in 1939 with access to the Vatican archives, was the first scholar to write a dispassionate account of Yohannan Hormizd's career. He has been followed more recently by Habbi. Much of the recent scholarship on Yohannan Hormizd is in French or German, but convenient English summaries of his career were made by David Wilmshurst in 2000 and by Christoph Baumer in 2006. In 2003 Wilhelm Baum and Dietmar Winkler devoted three paragraphs to Yohannan Hormizd.

== Background ==
By 1760 the Church of the East had become divided into three patriarchates:

- The largest and oldest Patriarchal See was based at the Rabban Hormizd monastery of Alqosh, near Mosul. It spread from Aqrah up to Seert and Nisibis, covering the South rich plain of Mosul (it is known also as Eliya line). Since the 15th century, its Patriarchs belonged to the Bar Mama (or Abuna) family and they were appointed through a strict hereditary system: the old patriarch chose one of his nephews (or sometimes his young brother), and consecrated him as metropolitan bishop with right of succession. The nephew was known as natar kursi (designated successor). In 1760 the patriarch of this See was Eliya XI (1722-1778), the uncle of Yohannan Hormizd.
- In 1681, the patriarchal See of Amid became independent and made a formal union with Rome (it is also known as the Josephite line). This See included a few towns such as Amid and Mardin in the North-West Mountains, which are now in Turkey. In 1760 the patriarch was Joseph IV Lazar Hindi, a relative of Augustine Hindi. The patriarchate struggled with financial difficulties due to the tax burden imposed by the Turkish authorities.
- The third patriarchal See was located in Qochanis and extended into the North East Mountains (also known as the Shimun line). This patriarchal line began in 1553 when Yohannan Sulaqa was consecrated bishop by the Pope, but soon became independent of Rome and still survives in the denomination today known as Assyrian Church of the East

== Early life ==
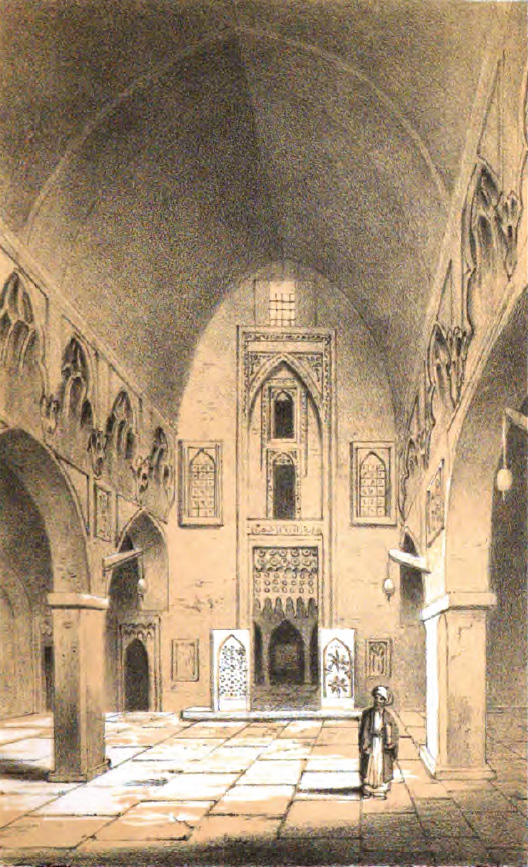
Church in Mosul about 1850

According to his autobiography, Yohannan Hormizd was born in 1760 in Alqosh to an Assyrian family. His father, the deacon Hanna (Yohannan), was the brother of the Mosul patriarch Eliya XI Denha (1722–1778).

The Vatican opened a correspondence with both the Mosul and Qochanis patriarchs in 1770. At this period hereditary succession (normally from uncle to nephew as the patriarchs themselves remained celibate) was in force in both patriarchates. Eliya XI had consecrated his nephew Ishoʿyahb a metropolitan in 1745 and had also bestowed upon him the traditional title natar kursya ('guardian of the throne'), thereby designating him his presumptive successor. Eliya XI and his nephew Ishoʿyahb both made Catholic professions of faith in 1771 in response to this overture from the Vatican, and Pope Clement XIV wrote to Eliya on 12 December 1772 to commend his zeal and to urge him to bring over his people to Catholicism. Earlier in the same year, however, Eliya had deposed Ishoʿyahb from his metropolitan rank, apparently alarmed by his ambition, and ordained the twelve-year-old Yohannan Hormizd, another nephew, as a deacon. Four years later, on 22 May 1776, Yohannan was consecrated a metropolitan by Eliya XI and named natar kursya in his turn. If his uncle had lived a few years longer, Yohannan's succession would probably have been assured, but the patriarch was among the victims of a plague which swept through the Mosul district in 1778, and died in the village of Alqosh on 29 April 1778.

== Irregular patriarchal succession, 1780–83 ==
On the following day his nephews Ishoʿyahb and Yohannan both made Catholic professions of faith and were reconciled. Despite the late patriarch's preference the Latin missionaries supported Ishoʿyahb, who shortly afterwards succeeded his uncle as patriarch, taking the name Eliya XII (1778-1804), without open opposition from the young Yohannan. In May 1779, as soon as he had obtained his firman of office from the Ottoman civil authorities, Ishoʿyahb abandoned his Catholic profession of faith. The notables of Mosul, with the support of the Latin missionaries, deposed him and unanimously chose Shemʿon of Amid, the Chaldean metropolitan of Mardin (1758–88), as patriarch in his place. Shemʿon however declined to accept the honour, and Ishoʿyahb's opponents were obliged to turn instead to the young Yohannan Hormizd, who had demonstrated his zeal for the Catholic cause since Ishoʿyahb's volte face by converting the Nestorians of the large Erbil villages of ʿAïnqawa, Armuta and Shaqlawa to Catholicism and encouraging them to withdraw their loyalty from his cousin. Yohannan was elected patriarch in 1780, and his supporters bribed the governor of Mosul to use his influence to obtain a firman from Constantinople, granting him authority over both the Chaldean Christians and the Nestorians. Yohannan then sent a profession of faith and a letter of submission to the Vatican.

The Vatican was placed in a dilemma by this turn of events. If Yohannan's profession of faith was genuine, he might be the Catholic patriarch of Babylon the Vatican had long been hoping for, and his confirmation would be rapidly followed by the adoption of Catholicism by all the villages of the Mosul patriarchate. On the other hand, to confirm Yohannan's election would be to condone the distasteful practice of hereditary succession. There was also the possibility that Yohannan's submission was no more sincere than Ishoʿyahb's had been two years earlier. The Vatican's initial response was therefore to inform Raphael Terconuski, the superior of the Catholic mission at Mosul, that Yohannan Hormizd's profession of faith appeared to be satisfactory, but that his election was to be considered null. On 18 February 1783, having considered further, the Sacred Congregation decided to appoint Yohannan archbishop of Mosul and administrator of the patriarchate of Babylon, granting him all the necessary powers to that end except the title and the insignia of the patriarch.

== Patriarchal administrator and archbishop of Mosul, 1783–1830 ==
=== Honeymoon period, 1783–1801 ===
For the next eight years Yohannan Hormizd seemed to justify the hopes placed in him. He lived on amicable terms with the Catholic missionaries and devoted his energies to the conversion to Catholicism of the villages under his authority. In May 1790, on the advice of the missionaries, he consecrated his nephew Shemʿon metropolitan, and in August of the same year sent him to the Zibar district, where he converted the Nestorian villages of Arena and Barzane. The following year he sent Shemʿon to Mengesh in the Sapna district, where he was equally successful. The high point of this honeymoon period came in February 1791, when the Vatican appointed him patriarchal administrator of the Amid patriarchate, recalling Laʿzar Hindi to Rome to leave him a free hand. This appointment led to strenuous protests from Laʿzar Hindi, his vicar-general Joseph ʿAttar and the clergy of Amid, and on 3 February 1793 Yohannan Hormizd's appointment was rescinded.

At about the same time the Mosul missionaries began to report disquieting rumours about his performance of his duties. He was said, among other things, to have released a monk from his vows for a payment of 73 piastres, to have used liturgical books full of errors, to have visited families without a companion, and to have feasted in the house of a newly-wed couple. Although each of these incidents was relatively minor in itself, and could equally have been explained by mere imprudence rather than active corruption, their frequency was disturbing. For his part, Yohannan accused the missionaries of arrogance and mischief-making, and on his request the apostolic vicar of Baghdad, Fulgence de Sainte Marie, was sent to Mosul as apostolic vicar in 1796 to report on the situation.

While his relations with the Vatican were cooling, Yohannan Hormizd also had to deal with the opposition of his cousin Ishoʿyahb, who continued to assert that he was the rightful patriarch. After Yohannan's irregular election in 1780 Ishoʿyahb withdrew to ʿAmadiya, whose governor Isma'il gave him 'the Nestorian dioceses of the mountain' to govern. He made another Catholic profession of faith on 7 April 1783 in an attempt to regain the sympathies of the missionaries, and to preserve the patriarchate within his family consecrated his nephew Hnanishoʿ metropolitan in 1784. Several years of bitter faction-fighting followed, in which the civil authorities in Baghdad held the balance between Muhammad, governor of Mosul, who supported Yohannan Hormizd, and Isma'il, governor of ʿAmadiya, who sheltered Ishoʿyahb and his followers. In 1788 Yohannan's nephew Shemʿon was arrested on a visit to the village of Bir Sivi in the Zakho district on Isma'il's orders, and was only released by the joint efforts of the governor of Mosul and Sulaiman, governor of Baghdad. In 1792 Yohannan and his two brothers went to ʿAmadiya on business, and were arrested, beaten and imprisoned for three and a half months by the Turkish authorities. Again, the governor of Baghdad intervened to secure their release.

=== First clash with the Vatican, 1802 ===
Yohannan's precarious relations with the Vatican survived a further test in 1801, only to sink further in 1802. In 1796 a delegation from the Malabar Christians arrived in Mosul and begged him to consecrate a bishop for them. Yohannan punctiliously wrote to the Vatican for guidance, but as Rome was then under French occupation he did not receive a reply, and in 1798 consecrated the Indian priest Paul Pandari as a bishop for the Malabar Christians. As many of the Malabar Christians were now in communion with the Syriac Orthodox Church, which had replaced the Church of the East as the main focus of loyalty among the Syrian Christians of India three centuries earlier, Yohannan tactfully appointed Pandari bishop 'of Mar Behnam', a celebrated West Syrian monastery near Mosul. The Malabar Christians informed the Vatican of Pandari's arrival in India in a letter of 17 January 1800, and Yohannan was asked to account for his actions. His explanation was accepted, and in a general consistory of 23 September 1801 the possibility of appointing him patriarch of Babylon was considered.

Unfortunately for Yohannan, his position was immediately undermined by renewed complaints from a section of the Chaldean church. On this occasion his opponents, supported by the Latin missionaries, impugned his orthodoxy and accused him of embezzling monastic property. In 1802 the priest Yohannan Mushe of Tel Isqof was despatched to Rome with letters demanding the dismissal of both Yohannan and his nephew Shemʿon, metropolitan of ʿAmadiya. He had only sufficient funds to reach Saida in Syria, where he entrusted the letter to the missionary Leopold Sebastien, who was leaving for Rome. The letters do not seem to have produced any immediate effect, but doubtless added to the concern in the Vatican about Yohannan Hormizd's reliability.

=== Increasing opposition, 1802–12 ===
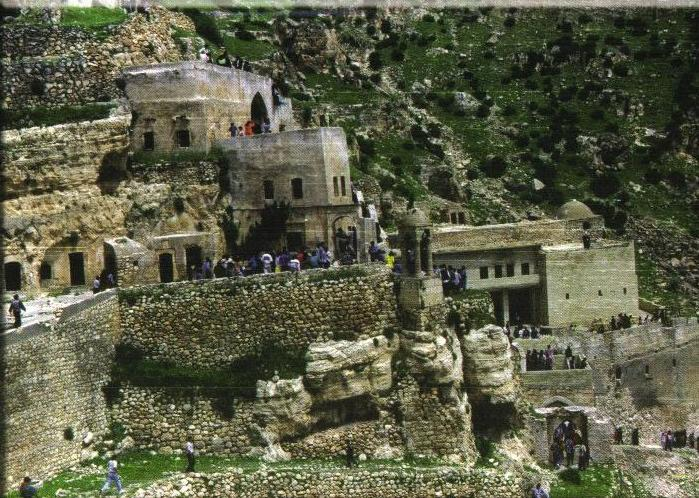
The monastery of Rabban Hormizd, Alqosh

Some years later Yohannan Hormizd faced another challenge to his authority from a Baghdad merchant named Gabriel Dambo, one of the most remarkable figures of the nineteenth century Chaldean church. A Chaldean Christian born in Mardin in 1775, Dambo had made sufficient money by middle age to be able to retire from business, and he decided to devote the rest of his life to the service of the Church. The once-thriving monastery of Rabban Hormizd near Alqosh had been abandoned for many years, and he dreamed of reviving its monastic life and restoring it to its former glory. He paved the way by giving free lessons in Baghdad to young Chaldean Christians in Arabic, grammar, logic and rhetoric, and after winning a formidable reputation as a teacher and scholar moved to Mosul. In 1808 he had no difficulty in persuading the Chaldean authorities and their Catholic missionary advisers to allow him to establish a seminary in the monastery of Rabban Hormizd. Before long he collected a number of pupils, who were vowed to poverty and celibacy, and was appointed lay superior of the seminary.

An energetic and charismatic visionary, Gabriel had his own ideas of how things should be done, and had little patience with the leaders of the Chaldean Church. If the new seminary was to succeed it needed its own income, and Gabriel insisted, probably correctly, that a large proportion of the property then in the hands of the patriarchal family was originally owned by the monastery of Rabban Hormizd and should rightly revert to it. Yohannan Hormizd, understandably, did not agree. This single issue would have been sufficient to poison relations between the two men, but there were other causes of friction as well. The new seminary had attracted men who disliked Yohannan Hormizd and wanted more vigorous leadership. The monks rallied around their superior and made no secret of their distaste for the patriarchal administrator. They were joined by the Catholic missionaries, who shared their admiration for Gabriel, and by a number of influential priests, notably Yohannan of Tel Isqof and Yohannan of Alqosh. In 1809 the Vatican seriously considered the possibility of suspending Yohannan Hormizd, and rumours that he had indeed been suspended were circulated by his opponents, eliciting a spirited letter of protest to the Vatican by his supporters on 15 October 1811.

Yohannan Hormizd's opponents were eventually able to win over the pasha of Mosul to their side, who briefly imprisoned him. The missionaries, led by the priest Joseph Campanile, immediately took steps to replace him, and Campanile on his own authority consecrated the priest Shemʿon Sayyegh bishop of Mosul. He was later reproved by the Vatican for this abusive consecration, and Augustine Hindi was ordered to send Shemʿon to Mosul merely as a priest. At the same time, learning of Yohannan Hormizd's imprisonment, the Vatican appointed Augustine Hindi apostolic delegate and the priest Giwargis of Alqosh apostolic vicar of Mosul, 'during the absence of the said archbishop', on 4 October 1811. This decision sent a clear signal that the Vatican's patience with Yohannan Hormizd was, for the moment, almost at an end.

=== Suspension and Reinstatement, 1812–30 ===
Yohannan Hormizd was eventually ransomed by his supporters and returned to Mosul, where he had several of his opponents imprisoned. After a series of mutual recriminations, the Rabban Hormizd monks and the Catholic missionaries wrote jointly to the Propaganda calling for Yohannan's deposition, alleging that he was opposed to their order, that he incited the Kurds of Isma'il Pasha against them, and that he was endeavouring to lead the Chaldean proselytes back to Nestorianism. The Vatican was alarmed at these charges and on 15 February 1812 suspended Yohannan from his functions as archbishop of Mosul and patriarchal administrator and appointed Shemʿon Sayyegh apostolic vicar for Mosul and the priest Giwargis of Alqosh apostolic vicar for the patriarchate of Babylon. Both men were placed under the direct authority of Augustine Hindi, who was named apostolic delegate for the affairs of the patriarchate of Babylon. While this decision temporarily placed the two Catholic patriarchates under a single trustworthy authority, it was from the Vatican's point of view little more than a makeshift, as Hindi could never command the same prestige in the Mosul district as a member of the old patriarchal family.

Yohannan Hormizd's suspension lasted for six years. At first he refused to accept the validity of the Vatican's decision, and issued threats against his opponents. Eventually he decided to seek a reconciliation with them, and a meeting was held on 20 February 1818 at Alqosh, attended by a hundred clergymen and notables, in which he agreed to apologise in writing for his misdeeds. In return, the assembly decided to send a letter to the Vatican to ask for his suspension to be lifted. Unfortunately, these good intentions were frustrated, as the letter's courier was killed en route and the letter never reached its destination. The Vatican, ignorant of the rapprochement between Yohannan Hormizd and his opponents, was briefed on the affairs of the Chaldean Church early in 1818 by Campanile, who is unlikely to have placed a sympathetic construction on Yohannan Hormizd's previous record. The Sacred Congregation concluded that Yohannan Hormizd had not taken his suspension seriously, and on 24 May 1818 it was renewed. The appointments of Augustine Hindi and Giwargis of Alqosh were renewed by briefs of 26 June 1818, and Yohannan Hormizd was informed of the new sentence in a latter of 11 July 1818.

Once again, Yohannan refused to accept the validity of the sentence, and for the next few years continued to assert his authority wherever he could, abetted by the civil authorities at ʿAmadiya. The Rabban Hormizd monks refused to have anything to do with him and accepted the authority of Augustine Hindi (the colophon of manuscripts copied in the monastery at this period dutifully mention the patriarchal administrator Mar Augustine, not Mar Yohannan). Three monks of the monastery of Rabban Hormizd were consecrated metropolitan bishops at Amid by Hindi in March 1825: the future patriarch Joseph Audo for Mosul, Lawrent Shoʿa for Baghdad, and Basil Asmar for ʿAmadiya. Two other bishops perhaps consecrated on the same occasion, Mikha'il Kattula and Ignatius Dashto, were sent to Seert and Mardin, traditional sees of the Amid patriarchate, but the other three returned to their home villages north of Mosul; Basil Asmar to Telkepe, Lawrent Shoʿa to Tel Isqof and Joseph Audo to Alqosh. There each of the three metropolitans began ordaining priests and deacons, in a direct challenge to Yohannan's authority.

Meanwhile, the Vatican reconsidered the condemnation of Yohannan Hormizd in the light of fresh information, and on 25 November 1826 publicly absolved him. At the same time, to restore the peace of the Chaldean Church, it urged the 66-year-old former patriarchal administrator to renounce his claims to the archdiocese of Mosul and to retire quietly. Yohannan, vindicated by the Vatican's absolution and supported by the local civil authorities, stubbornly refused to retire. Instead, he fought back against his opponents. In 1827, during the absence of the superior Gabriel Dambo in Rome, a number of monks in the monastery of Rabban Hormizd rebelled against its administrator Yohannan Gwera, who enjoyed the support of the metropolitan Joseph Audo. Yohannan Hormizd upheld the rebels, and was also able to have Basil Asmar expelled from Telkepe, forcing him to take refuge in Amid.

On 3 April 1827, shortly after Basil's arrival, Augustine Hindi died at Amid and was buried in a cemetery outside the city's walls. His death ended the 146-year independent existence of the Amid patriarchate. Basil Asmar, who had endeared himself to the clergy and people of Amid, was appointed Hindi's successor as metropolitan of Amid in 1828, and the Vatican confirmed the appointment. Amid reverted to a metropolitan diocese of the Chaldean Church, and the Amid patriarchate came to an end. Basil's appointment required a bishop to be found for the see of ʿAmadiya, and as Joseph Audo had failed to overcome the opposition of Yohannan's supporters to his appointment of metropolitan of Mosul, Gabriel Dambo and the Catholic missionaries agreed that he should be reassigned to ʿAmadiya. Like Basil before him, however, he declined to trust his life to the good faith of Isma'il Pasha, and withdrew to Alqosh, where he continued to intrigue among the Chaldeans and with the local authorities of Mosul against Yohannan. As a result of these intrigues Yohannan was imprisoned for a third time by the Ottoman authorities, for four months.

After Yohannan's release the charges made by his opponents were investigated by the Latin apostolic vicar Pierre-Alexander Coupperie, who travelled to Mosul to interview him. Yohannan was absolved of blame and restored to the exercise of his jurisdiction. Gabriel Dambo was then in Rome, to lobby more effectively against his rival, and he and his supporters declared Coupperie's decision invalid and insisted that they would not accept Yohannan's authority unless he was absolved personally by the pope. Coupperie therefore persuaded a number of influential Chaldeans to join him in a written appeal to the Vatican for Yohannan's reinstatement.

== Patriarch of Babylon, 1830–8 ==
Couperrie died shortly afterwards, and was succeeded as apostolic vicar by his assistant Laurent Trioche, who was consecrated a bishop for the purpose by Yohannan and the metropolitan Lawrent Shoʿa of Kirkuk on the Vatican's instructions. Like his predecessor, Trioche took Yohannan's part, and in a consistory held in the Vatican on 5 July 1830 it was agreed that Yohannan should be relieved of the archdiocese of Mosul, confirmed as patriarch of the Chaldeans and awarded the pallium (the traditional symbol of the Vatican's recognition of his succession). The decision was communicated to Yohannan Hormizd, now aged 74, in two papal bulls of the same date.

Fifty years after his irregular succession to Eliya XI (d. 1778), Yohannan Hormizd was finally recognised as patriarch of the Chaldean Church and awarded the title patriarch of Babylon of the Chaldeans. The suppression of the Amid patriarchate and the union of the Chaldean dioceses under the patriarch of Babylon in 1830 marked the birth of the modern Chaldean Catholic Church. The new patriarch was awarded the pallium in a ceremony held in Baghdad on 6 April 1834.

=== Further troubles ===
According to Badger, Yohannan Hormizd was unhappy with the thought of the unbroken succession of the Eliya line ending with his death, and made a curious bargain with the Nestorian church in an attempt to continue the succession. He ordained his nephew Mansur Sefaro a priest, and in 1831 sent him to the Nestorian patriarch Shemʿon XVII Abraham (1820–61), who consecrated him at Urmi and appointed him metropolitan over the Nestorians of ʿAmadiya. The new metropolitan took the name Eliya, the traditional name of the Chaldean patriarchs before the schism of 1552 (Yohannan's own family), and shortly afterwards abandoned the pretence of being a Nestorian and was readmitted into the Chaldean church, ultimately becoming the first Chaldean bishop of ʿAqra in 1852. In spite of this account, it was presumably with the intention of excluding this nephew from being his successor that in 1837 Yohannan, aware that he had not long to live, designated Gregory Peter di Natale, metropolitan of Gazarta, as coadjutor and "guardian of the throne".

The feud between Gabriel Dambo and Yohannan Hormizd ended in 1832, when Alqosh was pillaged by Kör Muhammad, chief of the Soran Kurds of Rawanduz. Gabriel Dambo was among the hundreds of East Syrians killed by the Kurds, and was succeeded as superior of the monastery of Rabban Hormizd by Yohannan Gwera. Despite the death of his chief rival, the patriarch's troubles continued throughout the 1830s. The monks of the monastery of Rabban Hormizd still refused to acknowledge his authority, and were supported by the metropolitan Joseph Audo, who now claimed jurisdiction over the monastery on the grounds that it lay within his diocese of ʿAmadiya. Yohannan Hormizd retaliated by suspending Audo and a number of Rabban Hormizd monks, but this action had little effect. A rumour spread that a new Latin apostolic vicar had been appointed in Rome and was now on his way to Mosul, and the patriarch's enemies temporarily came into line to make a good first impression on this important official. But when after two months he had still not arrived, they resumed their duties in flat defiance of Yohannan's orders. One man only, a priest named Stephen, sent in his submission to the patriarch, and was appointed priest of Telkepe.

The patriarch now sent the metropolitan Gregory Peter di Natale to Mosul, accompanied by a priest named Andrew to represent the apostolic vicar Laurent Trioche, to inquire into the conduct of the Rabban Hormizd monks. Joseph Audo thereupon retired to Amid, where he was welcomed by its metropolitan Basil, and the delegates condemned the obstinacy of the monks and returned to Baghdad.

In the light of this vindication of the patriarch's behaviour, an attempt was made by the monastery's superior Yohannan Gwera to put his side of the story. He travelled to Rome, accompanied by the monks Mikha'il Jammala and Peter, and eventually obtained a papal audience. The response of the Vatican authorities to the monks' complaints was lukewarm. They were assured that their allegations would be investigated but were also censured for their disobedience.

On 13 October 1837, conscious that he had not long to live, Yohannan designated as coadjutor and 'guardian of the throne' Gregory Peter di Natale, metropolitan of Gazarta, presumably with the intention of excluding his nephew Eliya from the patriarchal dignity. However, he did not promise the succession to his coadjutor, and in order to ensure that the hereditary principle would play no part in the selection of the next patriarch the Vatican appointed by a bull of 25 September 1838 Nicholas Zayʿa, metropolitan of Salmas, Yohannan's coadjutor with the right of succession. The reason given in the bull for this decision was the growing infirmity of the patriarch and the desirability of avoiding inconvenience and harm should the patriarchate suddenly become vacant. Zayʿa was Persian by birth, from Khosrowa, and as such could lay claim to the protection of the foreign consuls in Turkey. He had also been educated at the Propaganda, and it was hoped that after Yohannan's death he would loyally implement Vatican policy.

Yohannan, meanwhile, had died a few weeks earlier, on 16 August 1838. His family, which had provided successive patriarchs since the middle of the fifteenth century, now renounced its hereditary right of succession but insisted on keeping the title Abuna as the family name henceforward. Nicholas I Zayʿa duly succeeded Yohannan Hormizd as patriarch, but the manner in which his succession had been arranged by the Vatican offended most of the Chaldean bishops, and Zayʿa's brief reign (1839–46) would prove to be as stormy as that of his predecessor.
