= Joseph II (Chaldean Catholic patriarch) =

Head of the Chaldean Catholic Church from 1696 to 1713

Mār Joseph II Sliba Marouf
- Patriarch of the Chaldeans
- Church: Chaldean Catholic Church
- Archdiocese: Amid
- See: Amid of the Chaldeans
- Installed: 18 June 1696
- Term ended: 1713
- Predecessor: Joseph I
- Successor: Joseph III Timothy Maroge

Personal details
- Born: Sliba Marouf; 1667 Tel Keppe
- Died: 1713 (aged 45–46)
- Residence: Amid, Turkey

Mar Joseph II (Syriac: ܝܘܣܦ, romanized: Yawsep; Arabic: يوسف, romanized: Youssef), born Ṣliba d-beth Maʿrūf (or Sliba Bet Macruf) was the second incumbent patriarch of the Josephite line of Church of the East, a small patriarchate in full communion with the Pope that was active in the areas of Amid and Mardin in the 17th–19th century. He is officially recognized by the Chaldean Catholic Church as its patriarch from 1696 to 1713.

== Life ==
Sliba Marouf was born in 1667 in Tel Keppe, Ottoman Empire, and received first orders at fourteen. He moved to Diyarbakır (Amid) in 1689 where he became a disciple of Patriarch Yawsep I, and at the age of 24 in 1691, he was consecrated as a bishop metropolitan of Diyarbakır without the prior consent of Rome. He was chosen by Joseph I as his successor to the Chaldean Catholic Patriarchate in 1694 under the name of Joseph II, but this appointment became effective only when Rome accepted his predecessor's resignation in 1696. Thus Sliba Marouf was confirmed patriarch by Holy See on June 18, 1696, with the name of Joseph II.

In Diyarbakır, he attended a local Muslim school, where he studied Arabic, philosophy, and some theology. In addition to his roles as bishop and patriarch, he copied manuscripts and authored several theological, liturgical, and poetic works in Classical Syriac, dialectal Syriac (Sureth), and Arabic. His writings exhibited great European influence due to the close relations he had with Latin missionaries who made Diyarbakır one of their main outposts. This is also why he is attributed with further Latinization of the East Syriac rite of his mother church, the Church of the East.

Joseph's ministry was faced with strong opposition from traditionalists. This forced him in 1708 to ask permission from Rome to resign and move to Italy, a request that was not granted.

During the plague that spread in 1708, he distinguished himself by providing help and pastoral care to the sick until he too became infected. In early 1713, he chose Timothy Maroge as his successor with the name Joseph III, and died from the plague a few months later in 1712 at 9am on Monday June 2, at the age of 46.

== Works ==
Joseph is remembered as a Syriac and Arabic writer and for having translated many texts from Latin. Some of his main works include:

- "Joy of the Just and the Medicine of the Sinners" (rwāzā d-kene w-sammā d-ḥaṭṭāye) — translated to Syriac from Arabic, based on the works of Eusebio Nieremberg y Ottín, a Spanish Jesuit popular among Latin missionaries.
- "Enlightening Lamp" (lampedā nuhrānā) — also translated from Arabic into Syriac, a compendium of the Roman Catholic ecumenical councils up to Ferrara-Florence in 1439.
- "Book of Logic" (ktābā d-logiqi aw d-mallilutā) — Original in Arabic, translated into Syriac by Yawsep.
- "Book of the Magnet" — a devotional-moral handbook, extremely popular in Catholic circles among Church of the East members; essentially translations of Latin devotional works.
- "Polished Mirror" (maḥziṭā mriqtā) — an also-popular apologia against Miaphysites and Nestorians in defense of Roman Catholic dogma including Papal supremacy; some of it taken from Latin sources. This Speculum Tersum was translated from Syriac into Latin by Assemani and is conserved in the Vatican Library.

Further accredited to Joseph are several liturgical works, including a penqitā and a gazzā, in which he introduced some Latin feasts and commemorations (dukrāne) of saints; additionally, he also composed explanation of the ecclesiastical services (puššāq tešmšātā ʿedtānāyātā).

He also composed a memrā on spiritual exile (aksnāyutā) and a commentary on the Barhebraeus's memrā "On Divine Wisdom". He supplemented Barhebraeus's "On Perfection" with additional verses. He further authored many poems of various genres (dorekyātā, turgāme, madrāše) in Classical Syriac and Sureth.

As the head of a Uniate Church, he corresponded extensively with Rome, much of which has survived in partial form, including an Arabic-language Catholic profession of faith transmitted to the Pope.

== Sources ==
- Frazee, Charles A. (2006) [1983]. Catholics and Sultans: The Church and the Ottoman Empire 1453-1923. Cambridge: Cambridge University Press. ISBN 9780521027007.
- Wilmshurst, David (2000). The Ecclesiastical Organisation of the Church of the East, 1318–1913. Louvain: Peeters Publishers. ISBN 9789042908765.
- Brock, Sebastian P.; Butts, Aaron M.; Kiraz, George A.; Van Rompay, Lucas (2011). "Gorgias Encyclopedic Dictionary of the Syriac Heritage". Beth Mardutho. ISBN 9781593337148 – via Academia.edu.
- Foumia, Khairy (2015). An Episode in the History of Telkeppe amd Yousif II Patriarch of the Chaldeans. Michigan: Chaldean Diocese of Michigan.

Preceded by Joseph I	Patriarch of Babylon; 1696–1713	Succeeded by Joseph III Timothy Maroge
