= Rabban Hormizd Monastery =

Assyrian Church monastery in Iraq

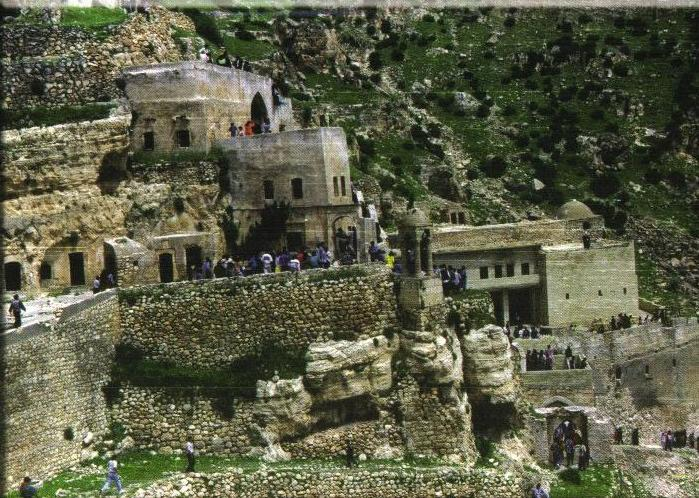

- Location within Iraq

Religion
- Affiliation: Church of the East, Chaldean Catholic Church

Location
- Location: Alqosh, Nineveh, Iraq
- Interactive map of Rabban Hormizd Monastery
- Coordinates: 36.749167°N 43.114444°E

Architecture
- Completed: 640 A.D.

Rabban Hormizd Monastery (Syriac: ܪܒܢ ܗܘܪܡܝܙܕ ܥܓ̰ܡܝܐ) is an important convent to the Assyrian Church of the East, and the Chaldean Catholic Church, founded about 640 AD by the Church of the East, carved out in the mountains about 2 miles from Alqosh, Iraq, 28 miles north of Mosul. It was the official residence of the patriarchs of the Eliya line of the Assyrian Church of the East from 1551 to the 18th century, and after the union with Rome in the early 19th century, passed to becoming a prominent monastery of the Chaldean Catholic Church.

The convent is named after Rabban Hormizd (rabban is the Syriac for "monk") of the Church of the East, who founded it in the seventh century.

== History of the monastery ==
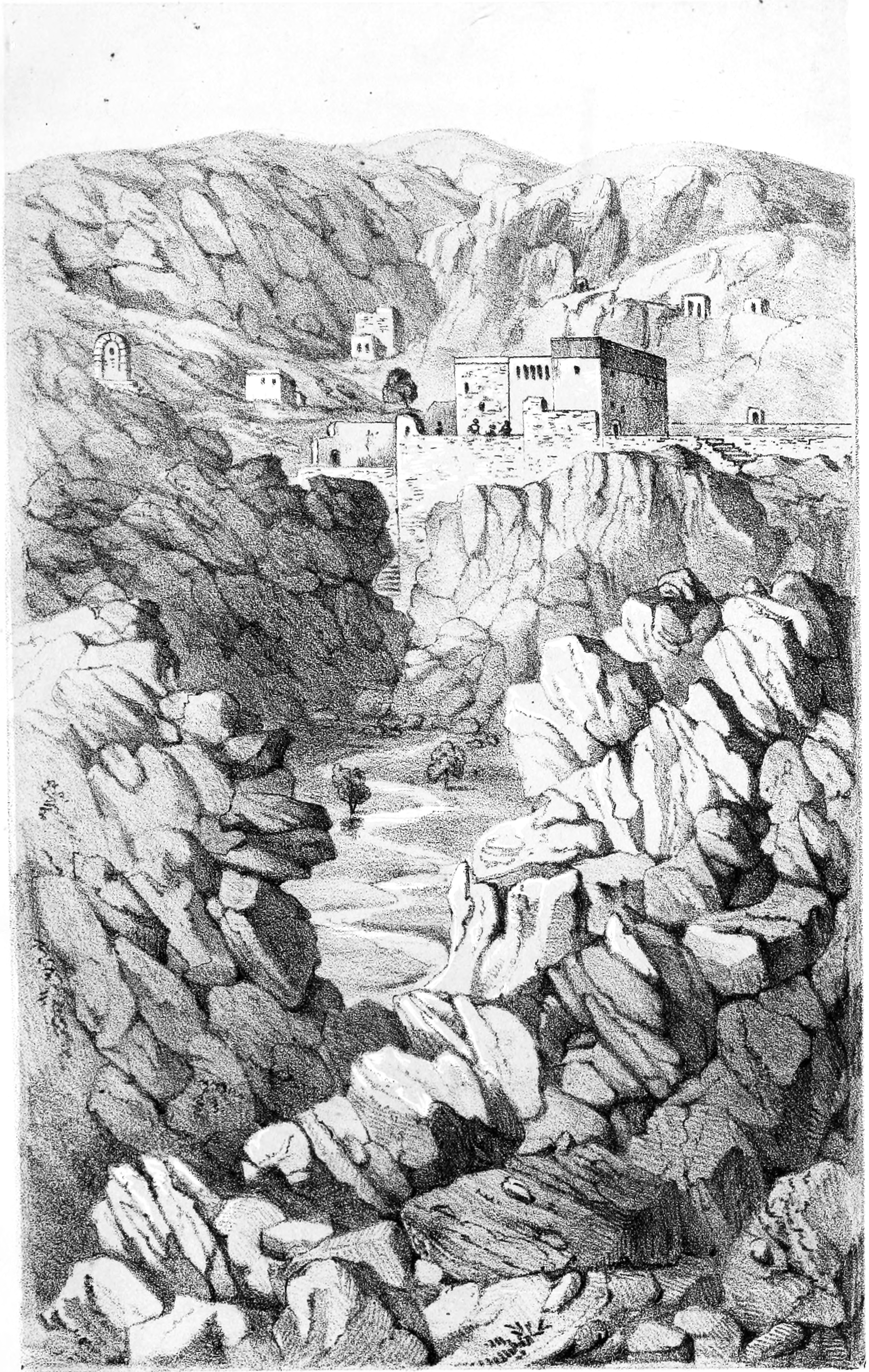
The monastery of Rabban Hormizd in 1843

Because of the fame of Rabban Hormizd, the monastery he founded became extremely important for the Church of the East. It flourished until the 10th century. Already, before the end of the 15th century, the Rabban Hormizd Monastery served as the patriarchal burial site. Yohannan Sulaqa was monk of the Rabban Hormizd Monastery before his travel to Rome to become the first Patriarch of the Chaldean Catholic Church.

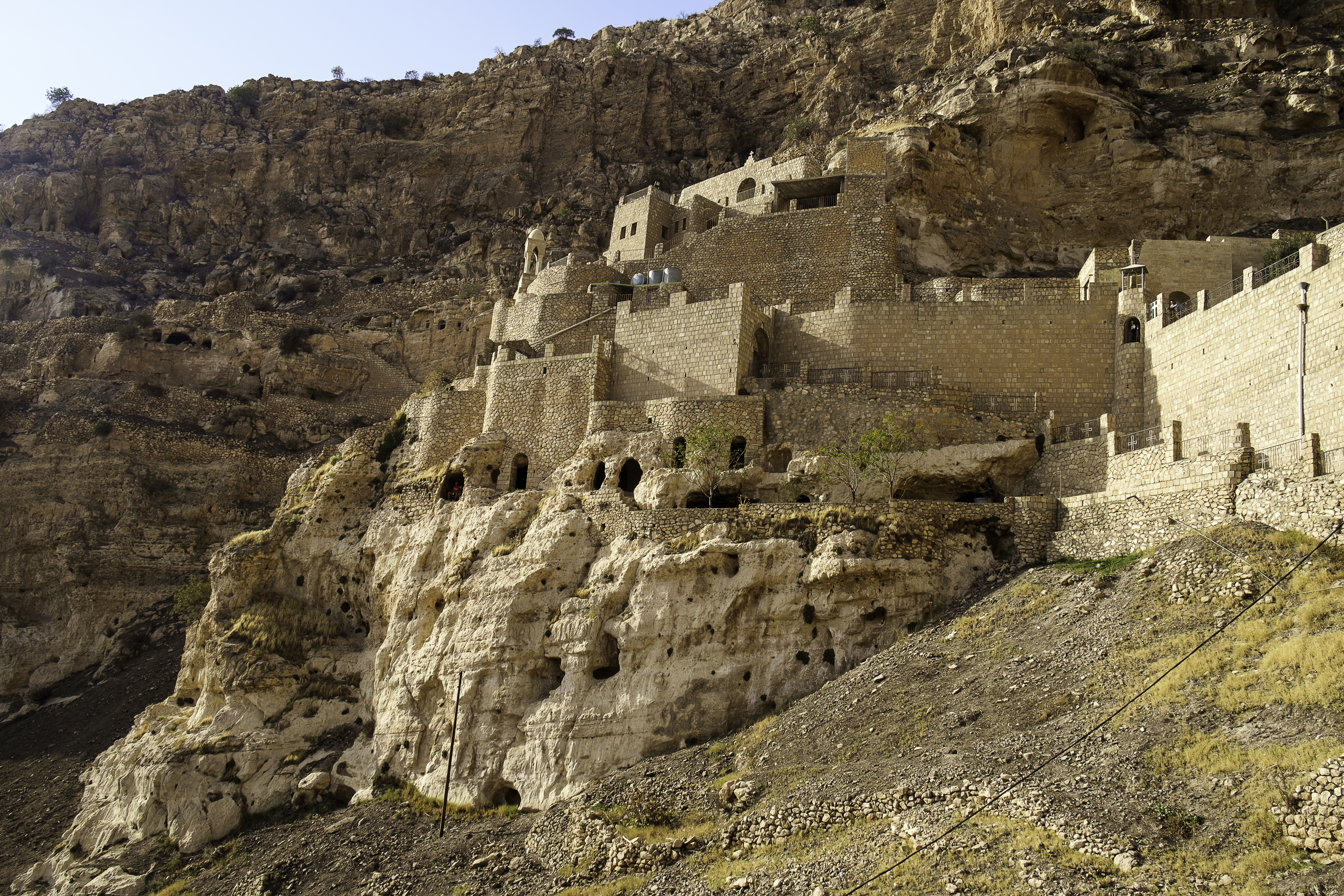
The monastery of Rabban Hormizd

Between 1551 and the 18th century, the convent became the official residence of the patriarchs of the Eliya line of the Church of the East, which was the oldest and largest patriarchal See of the Church of the East, the only one existing patriarchal line before the Sulaqa's 1553 split. Nine patriarchal graves, from 1497 to 1804, are still located in the corridor that leads to the cell of Rabban Hormizd. In about 1743, due to pestilence and the attacks of the Kurds, at the beginning of the Ottoman-Persian War (1743-1746). During the war in 1743, the army of Nader Shah attacked the monastery during their march on Mosul. After that, the monastery was left mainly unmanned.

In 1808, the Assyrian Gabriel Dambo (1775-1832) revived the abandoned monastery, rebuilt it, collected a number of pupils vowed to poverty and celibacy, and installed there a seminary. At first this initiative was opposed by Yohannan VIII Hormizd, then Archbishop of Mosul, even if it was supported by the patriarchal administrator Augustine Hindi. Patriarch Joseph Audo, before he was appointed the bishop of Mosul, was himself a monk of Rabban Hormizd monastery.

Gabriel Dambo was murdered in 1832 by the soldiers of Mohammed Pasha, the Kurdish emir of Rawandouz. Again in 1838, the monastery of Rabban Hormizd and the town of Alqosh were attacked by the Kurds of Soran and hundreds of Assyrian Chaldeans died and in the 1843 the Kurds started to collect as much money as they could from Christian villages, killing those who refused: more than ten thousand Christians were killed and the icons of the Rabban Hormizd monastery defaced.

The library of the convent of Rabban Hormizd was rich in Syriac manuscripts. In 1828, many of these manuscripts were looted and broken up by Moussa Pasha, who had imitated the emir of Rawandouz in revolting against the Turks. In 1868, 147 volumes, manuscripts and prints, suffered the same treatment from Ismael Pasha, the successor of Moussa Pasha. The monks went on anyway to buy and copy manuscripts, thus forming an important library.

== Description of the monastery in 1890 ==
E. A. Wallis Budge, who visited Rabban Hormizd Monastery in 1890, describes the monastery with these words:

Rabban Hormizd Monastery is built half about half way up the range of mountains which encloses the plain of Mosul on the north, and stands in a sort of amphitheatre, which is approached by a rocky path that leads through a narrow defile; this path has been paved by generations of monks. The church is of stone and is of a dusky red colour; it is built upon an enormous rock. In the hills round about the church and buildings of the monastery are rows of caves hewn out of the solid rock, in which the stern ascetics of former generations lived and died.

They have neither doors nor any protection from the inclemency of the weather, and the chill which they strike into the visitor gives an idea of what those who lived in them must have suffered from the frosts of winter and the drifting rain. Some of them have niches hewn in their sides or backs in which the monks probably slept, but many lack even these means of comfort. The cells are separate one from the other, and are approached by narrow terraces, but some of them are perched in almost inaccessible places, and, unless other means of entrance existed in former days, could only have been approached by the monks crawling down from the crest of the mountain and swinging themselves into them.

I saw no marks of fire in any of the cells. Some cells have a second small cave hewn out behind the larger one which is entered through an opening just large enough for a man of average size to crawl through. The monks eat meat on Easter Day and Christmas Day only, and their usual food consists of boiled wheat and lentils, and dark coloured, heavy bread cakes. They drink neither wine nor spirits, and they have neither light nor fire. They drink rain water which they preserve in rock cisterns. They are called to prayer by the ringing of a bell at sunset, midnight, day-break, and at certain times of the day. The number of the monks in 1820 was about fifty; in 1843 it was thirty-nine; in 1879—80 it was sixteen, and in 1890 it was about ten.

== The new monastery ==
The monastery of Rabban Hormizd was too exposed to attack to remain a functioning monastery, and was also a symbol of a turbulent time. Patriarch Joseph Audo decided to replace it, and in 1859, with financial assistance from the Vatican, built a new Monastery of Our Lady of the Seeds in a safer plain site near Alqosh about one mile from the ancient monastery. The new monastery quickly replaced Rabban Hormizd as the principal monastery of the Chaldean Church, and most of the monks moved to the new location.

== Sources ==
- Frazee, Charles A. (2006) [1983]. Catholics and Sultans: The Church and the Ottoman Empire 1453-1923. Cambridge: Cambridge University Press. ISBN 9780521027007.
- Wilmshurst, David (2000). The Ecclesiastical Organisation of the Church of the East, 1318–1913. Louvain: Peeters Publishers. ISBN 9789042908765.
