= Schism of 1552 =

Division of the Church of the East

The schism of 1552 was the division of the Church of the East into two factions, one of which entered into communion with Rome becoming part of the Catholic Church at this time and the other remained independent until the 19th century. Although the Eliya line, which emerged as a result of this schism, did eventually enter into communion with Rome, various Eastern Protestant sects with their origins in the Church of the East emerged as a result of this schism. The Shimun line whose entry into full communion with Rome caused this schism became independent again by the 17th century. The circumstances of the 1552 schism were controversial at the time and have been disputed ever since.

== Summary of events ==

(Not shown are ante-Nicene, nontrinitarian, and restorationist denominations.)

Around the middle of the fifteenth century the patriarch Shemʿon IV Basidi made the patriarchal succession hereditary, normally from uncle to nephew. This practice, which tended to result in a shortage of eligible heirs, eventually led to a schism in the Church of the East. The patriarch Shemʿon VII Ishoʿyahb (1539–1558) caused great offence at the beginning of his reign by designating his twelve-year-old nephew Hnanishoʿ as his successor, presumably because no older relatives were available. Several years later, probably because Hnanishoʿ had died in the interim, he designated as successor his fifteen-year-old brother Eliya, the future patriarch Eliya VI (1558–1591). Besides making these two provocative appointments, he was also accused by his opponents of permitting concubinage, selling clerical posts and living intemperately. By 1552 Shemʿon VII Ishoʿyahb had become so unpopular that his opponents rebelled against his authority. The rebels, principally from the Amid, Seert and Salmas districts, elected as patriarch a monk named Shimun VIII Yohannan Sulaqa, the leader of Rabban Hormizd Monastery near Alqosh. No bishop of metropolitan rank was available to consecrate him, as canonically required. Franciscan missionaries were already at work among the Nestorians as well, and they legitimised their position by persuading Shimun VIII's supporters and getting him consecrated by Pope Julius III (1550–1555).

Shimun VIII went to Rome to put his case in person. At Rome he made a satisfactory Catholic profession of faith and presented a letter, drafted by his supporters in Mosul, which set out his claims to be recognised as patriarch. On 9 April 1553, having satisfied the Pope that he was a good Catholic, Shimun VIII was consecrated bishop and archbishop in the basilica of Saint Peter. On 28 April he was recognised as "Patriarch of Mosul" by Pope Julius III in the bull Divina disponente clementia and received the pallium from the pope's hands at a secret consistory in the Vatican. These events, which marked the birth of the Chaldean Catholic Church, created a permanent schism in the Church of the East.

Shimun VIII returned to Mesopotamia towards the end of the same year. In December 1553 he obtained documents from the Ottoman authorities recognising him as an independent "Chaldean" patriarch, and in 1554, during a stay of five months in Amid, consecrated five metropolitan bishops (for the dioceses of Gazarta, Hesna d'Kifa, Amid, Mardin and Seert). Shemʿon VII Ishoʿyahb responded by consecrating two more underage members of the patriarchal family as metropolitans for Nisibis and Gazarta. He also won over the governor of Amadiya, who invited Shimun VIII to Amadiya, imprisoned him for four months, and put him to death in January 1555.

== Disputed circumstances of Sulaqa's election ==
There are two very different, and contradictory, traditions as to the circumstances of Sulaqa's election. According to one version of events, which derives from a letter of Andrew Masius and is also reflected in the Vatican's consistorial act of April 1553, the schism of 1552 was precipitated by the death of the patriarch 'Shemʿon Bar Mama' at Gazarta in 1551, and by the subsequent consecration of an eight-year-old boy, 'Shemʿon VIII Denha', as his successor. Sulaqa was thereupon elected by a party in the church which disapproved of the principle of hereditary succession. Shemʿon VIII Denha and Sulaqa then lived for two years as rival patriarchs, until Shemʿon Denha encompassed Sulaqa's death in 1555, dying himself in 1558. This tradition sought to legitimise Sulaqa's election to Pope Julius III and his cardinals, by presenting it as a return to the elective principle.

This version of events has been repeated in several subsequent histories, by Giuseppe Luigi Assemani in 1775, and Filippo Angelico Becchetti in 1796. It has also been accepted by several modern scholars of the Church of the East, including the Chaldean deacon Joseph Tfinkdji in 1914, and Cardinal Eugene Tisserant in 1931. More recently, it was accepted in 1993 by Jean-Maurice Fiey, a scholar of particular eminence in this field, who listed all known patriarchs and bishops of the East and West Syrian churches, including the patriarchs Simon VII Bar Mama (1538–1551) and Simon VIII Denha (1551–1558).

According to another version of events, deriving from the testimony of the second Chaldean patriarch ʿAbdishoʿ IV Maron and confirmed by a letter of January 1555 by the papal nuncio Ambrose Buttigeg, Sulaqa was consecrated during a rebellion against the reigning patriarch Shemʿon VII Ishoʿyahb (1539–1558). The rebellion was prompted by Shemʿon's dreadful conduct in general, and by his consecration of two underage metropolitans in particular. This tradition sought to legitimise Sulaqa's election to critics in the Church of the East, by presenting it as a justified revolt against a dissolute patriarch.

The two versions of events cannot be reconciled, and give rise to the strong suspicion that Sulaqa or his supporters lied to the Vatican in 1552 when they claimed that Sulaqa had been elected in response to the consecration of the eight-year-old patriarch Shemʿon VIII Denha after Bar Mama's death in 1551.

Attention was first drawn to the contradictions in the relevant sources by Jacques Marie Vosté in 1931, but he did not pursue their implications. In an influential study by Joseph Habbi in 1966, these implications were more fully explored. Habbi's study concentrated on the contradictions between the surviving documentary evidence in the Vatican and an alternative version of events preserved in the poems of ʿAbdishoʿ IV Maron, Sulaqa's successor as Chaldean patriarch, and he concluded that Sulaqa was elected in 1552 in the course of a rebellion against the reigning patriarch Shemʿon VII Ishoʿyahb. Habbi focused purely on the literary sources, and did not consider a significant additional body of evidence available in the colophons of a number of sixteenth-century East Syrian manuscripts. The evidence from these colophons, deployed by David Wilmshurst, fully supported Habbi's main contention, and also shed further light on the circumstances of Sulaqa's election by identifying the two youthful metropolitans whose consecration precipitated the schism of 1552. Habbi and Wilmshurst's conclusions were accepted by Heleen Murre-van den Berg in an important article published in Hugoye in 1999, The Patriarchs of the Church of the East from the Fifteenth to Eighteenth Centuries, and have not subsequently been challenged by scholars of the Church of the East.

== Disputes over history ==
=== Version of Andrew Masius ===
According to a letter of Andrew Masius, Sulaqa was elected shortly after the death of the previous patriarch at Gazarta in 1551, who was succeeded by his eight-year old nephew Shemʿon Denha, the only surviving male relative. According to Labourt, who does not identify his source, Shemʿon Denha was consecrated by Hnanishoʿ, the sole remaining metropolitan. Sulaqa was thereupon elected by a party in the church which disapproved of the principle of hereditary succession, and Shemʿon VIII Denha and Sulaqa lived for some years as rival patriarchs, until Shemʿon Denha encompassed Sulaqa's death in 1555, dying himself in 1558. This tradition is reflected in the language used in the consistorial act in the Vatican recognising Sulaqa as patriarch. After asserting that Sulaqa's election followed the death of the patriarch 'Simon Mama', the act continues as follows:

About a hundred years ago a patriarch tried to make his sacred office hereditary in his family, and every bishop, metropolitan and patriarch since has been a member of his family. The last patriarch likewise tried to designate as his successor his nephew, whom he had made a bishop when just a child of eight, but died before he could achieve his aim. The whole nation, priests and laymen alike, resolved to take this heaven-sent opportunity of ending the tyranny and restoring its old right of election.

=== Problems with Masius's account ===
Despite the authority of the scholars who have followed Masius, there are grounds for rejecting his version of events. First, the only evidence is Masius's statement that a patriarch died at Gazarta in 1551, and it is possible that he misunderstood the position. His letter drew on a letter written at Mosul in 1552 by Sulaqa's supporters, which was taken to Rome by Sulaqa. This letter, quoted in two slightly different versions by Giuseppe Simone Assemani, and Wilhelm van Gulik, does not mention the recent death of a patriarch. Instead, it states that the patriarch had tried to create a metropolitan from among his relatives:

A hundred years ago we had a patriarch who would only consecrate a metropolitan from among his own stock, clan and family, and his family has maintained that custom for the last hundred years. Now only one bishop is left from the family, and he has impudently tried to do the same as his predecessors. But we have refused to accept or proclaim him ...

Furthermore, by this period it had become customary for the patriarchs to be buried in the monastery of Rabban Hormizd, and there is no intermediate tomb between that of Shemʿon VI (†1538) and that of a patriarch named Shemʿon who died in 1558.

Finally, a number of poems on the life of Sulaqa composed in the year following his death by his successor ʿAbdishoʿ IV Maron know nothing of the recent death of a patriarch and the succession of Shemʿon Denha. In these poems, translated in 1931 by Jacques Marie Vosté, Sulaqa and his supporters rebelled against a dissolute patriarch named Bar Mama ('son of Mama'), a veteran in office and not a recently elected child. The earliest manuscripts of these poems are copied in 1556 by Sulaqa's brother Joseph, metropolitan of India (MS Vat Syr 45), and again, a little later by Eliya Asmar, metropolitan of Amid (MS Borgia 21). This patriarch remained in office after Sulaqa's election, and was eventually able to encompass his death in 1555. He may therefore have been the "feeble catholicus Shemʿon, son of the deceased Mama", whose (undated) ownership note has been preserved in a manuscript copied in 1482.

=== Version of ʿAbdishoʿ IV Maron ===
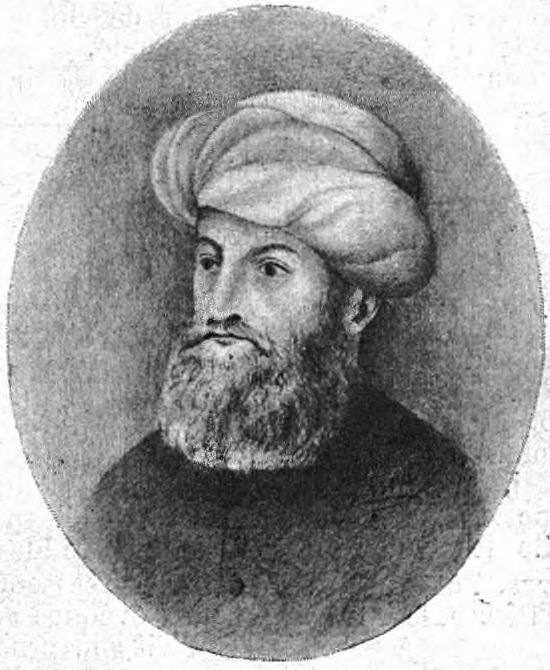
ʿAbdishoʿ IV Maron, who succeeded Sulaqa as Chaldean patriarch in 1555

ʿAbdishoʿ's account, written close to the events it describes, and for a readership familiar with the circumstances of Sulaqa's election, is to be preferred to the version (more favourable to Sulaqa) which outsiders were encouraged to believe. ʿAbdishoʿ wrote both to justify Sulaqa's irregular election and to rebut its critics. The emphasis of the poem showed that Sulaqa's supporters were uneasy on two points: first, that they had rebelled against a reigning patriarch; and secondly, that they had gone outside the Church of the East and sought Sulaqa's consecration at Rome. ʿAbdishoʿ dealt with the second point by stressing the lack of bishops available in Kurdistan, and giving a (spurious) list of previous patriarchs who had been consecrated at Rome. The first and more important criticism he parried by citing biblical examples of the deposition of bad rulers, stressing Bar Mama's unfitness for his position, and suggesting that he was "as good as dead":

When this Bar Mama had estranged himself from the patriarchal throne, and might just as well have been dead as alive, the bounty of our Saviour chose an excellent monk of the monastery of Beth Qoqa, named Sulaqa, and created him catholicus.

A long passage in one of these poems lists a catalogue of Bar Mama's offences:

Observe and consider attentively, wise reader, how the justice of the Most High hurled down this impure Bar Mama from his lofty throne. Because his sins accumulated and his injustices multiplied, Justice justly manifested herself and rejected him like false coin. His outward behaviour attests the inner man, and his actions declare that his end is near. He cares nothing for fasts, prayers, and liturgical vigils, but all his delight is in idleness and morning revels. His life is one long round of banquets of exotic dishes. He is a slave to his passion for good living and pleasure. He detests Sunday fasts, preferring instead to drink wine. Whatever he may say, his conduct makes it all too plain that he has no wish to judge the guilty. He is consumed by the love of money, the root of all evil, which has taken such deep root in his heart that it has driven out any virtuous feeling. He dearly loves gold and silver, and so he courts the wealthy, conferring the clerical order of his choice on anyone who gives him enough money. Although it is written that gold and silver should be valued no more than a shard of baked earth, he worships it as boldly and openly as a heathen. We have all seen how he has sold for money the gift of grace, which was given freely by our Lord, and which by God's pleasure no worthy recipient has ever yet bought. In his insatiable greed he has taken the priesthood, which cannot be bought or sold, and put it on the market.

He despised the Doctors and disregarded their teachings, claiming that they were irrelevant and unnecessary. As though inviting the misfortune he richly deserves, he disobeyed the commandments of God, the ecclesiastical canons, and the statutes of the Apostles. He ignored the teachings of Saint Peter and despised the prohibitions of Saint Paul. He set at nothing the acts of all the synods, and viciously broke every law. He trod underfoot the law of the Old Testament, and ignored the teachings of the New. He loved iniquity, delighted in fraud, hated truth, and abhorred sincerity. He invented shameful stories against the Mother of Churches. He persecuted monasteries and churches, and looted houses and convents. Hating the good and loathing justice, he overthrew the temples and oratories of the Saints and Fathers. He made a mockery of the rituals of the churches, and overturned the clerical orders.

It is impossible to express fully the wickedness of this perverse man. Many dioceses were left widowed, and he handed over their administration to laymen. He deposed and suspended many priests who had committed no fault. He irregularly ordained as a metropolitan a boy of twelve, inviting excommunication from his bishops. Not content with that, he consecrated as a metropolitan another boy of only fifteen, as truthful and trustworthy witnesses will confirm. How many unjust betrothals, illicit marriages and irregular unions were contracted on his orders! He allowed one man to take three wives, an abominable crime which shocks the conscience of men and beasts alike. He let another man without either schooling or wit take two wives, in flagrant contravention of our teachings. A third man had his authority to marry the wife of his father's brother, a grave and horrible sin. A fourth was allowed to marry the wife of his mother's brother, a union which the Lawgiver has specifically forbidden. A fifth also, with his approval, sinfully married his godmother, who should have been to him as a sister or an aunt.

=== Evidence of Ambrose Buttigeg ===
Confirmation of ʿAbdishoʿ's version of events was later provided by the bishop Ambrose Buttigeg, a Maltese Dominican who accompanied Sulaqa back to Mesopotamia in late 1553 as papal nuncio. On 12 January 1555 Buttigeg wrote to the Vatican to inform pope Julius III that Shemʿon Bar Mama was still alive and had just contrived Sulaqa's murder:

Your holiness will be shocked to learn that, contrary to what your holiness, the most reverend cardinals, and the rest of you were told, the old patriarch never died at all, and has recently murdered the said Simon Sulaqa.

=== Evidence from manuscript colophons ===
To have committed the catalogue of crimes imputed to him by Abdisho IV Maron, the patriarch Bar Mama must have held office for several years. According to the evidence from the dating formulas of manuscripts copied in the first half of the sixteenth century, the patriarch Shemʿon VI, who died on 5 August 1538, was succeeded by his brother Shemʿon VII Ishoʿyahb, who is first mentioned as a metropolitan and guardian of the throne as early as 1504 (MS Seert 46), and who is first mentioned as patriarch in a colophon of 1539 (MS Vat Syr 339). He is clearly ʿAbdishoʿ's patriarch Bar Mama.

According to ʿAbdishoʿ, Bar Mama scandalised the faithful by consecrating two boys as metropolitans, one of twelve and the other of fifteen, and of handing over the administration of other dioceses to laymen. (ʿAbdishoʿ does not mention a proposal to consecrate a boy of eight as a metropolitan, and would surely have done so if it had been true.) As Bar Mama would no doubt have consecrated other members of his family for these vacant dioceses if any had been available, it is likely that these two metropolitans were the only bishops he consecrated. Evidence from a number of manuscript colophons indicates that Shemʿon VII Ishoʿyahb did indeed make only two metropolitan appointments before the schism of 1552.

In 1539, not long after his accession, he consecrated his nephew Hnanishoʿ metropolitan of Mosul, and shortly afterwards designated him "guardian of the throne" (natar kursya). Hnanishoʿ is mentioned as metropolitan of Mosul in a colophon of 1539 (MS Vat Syr 339), as metropolitan in 1540 (MS Vat Syr 245), as metropolitan and natar kursya in 1540/41 (MS in the St Joseph collection in Beirut), as the patriarch's nephew and natar kursya in 1543 (MS Mardin 14), and as metropolitan and natar kursya in 1545 (MS Batnaya 35).

Some colophons of 1544 (MS BM Syr 34) and 1545 (MS Vat Syr 66) mention Hnanishoʿ as natar kursya and metropolitan of Gazarta. He was probably transferred to Gazarta not long beforehand because its previous bishop had died. A metropolitan Gabriel of Gazarta is mentioned in the colophons of ten manuscripts copied between 1529 and 1542, the last of which was copied at Gazarta on 12 November 1542.

It is clear from these references that, besides holding successively the metropolitan appointments of Mosul and Gazarta, Hnanishoʿ was also natar kursya as early as 1541 and as late as 18 October 1545. Between 18 October 1545 and 1550 he was replaced as natar kursya by his brother Eliya, in unknown circumstances. Eliya became patriarch in 1558, and is known from his tomb inscription in the monastery of Rabban Hormizd to have been consecrated a metropolitan fifteen years earlier, in 1543. He is mentioned as natar kursya in colophons of 1550, May 1552 and June 1554. According to ʿAbdishoʿ, Bar Mama "invited the excommunication of his bishops" with his earlier consecration. The consecration of Eliya as metropolitan in 1543 doubtless increased his unpopularity, but does not seem to have elicited an immediate reaction. Hnanishoʿ remained natar kursya for at least two years after Eliya's consecration, and the schism of 1552 was probably provoked by Eliya's designation as natar kursya, perhaps as late as 1550.

The age of the two brothers at the time of their consecrations is not known, but they were both certainly young men. Eliya died in 1591, and his tomb inscription in the monastery of Rabban Hormizd mentions that he had been a metropolitan for fifteen years and patriarch for thirty-two years. The colophon of a manuscript of 1562 (Berlin Syr 82), copied four years after Eliya became patriarch, contains a prayer that God might "uphold the youth" of the patriarch and his brother the metropolitan Hnanishoʿ, and "give them long life".

For Hnanishoʿ and Eliya, consecrated in 1539 and 1543 respectively, to be described as 'youths' in 1562, they must both have been consecrated at a young age, and were doubtless the two young metropolitans consecrated by Bar Mama, at the ages of twelve and fifteen respectively. If Hnanishoʿ was twelve when he was consecrated in 1539, he would have been thirty-five in 1562; similarly, if Eliya was fifteen when he was consecrated in 1543, he would have been thirty-four in 1562 and a respectable sixty-three at the time of his death in 1591.
