= Shemon VI =

Mar Shemʿon VI
- Patriarch of the Church of the East
- Church: Church of the East
- See: Seleucia-Ctesiphon
- Installed: 1504
- Term ended: 5 August 1538
- Predecessor: Eliya V
- Successor: Shemon VII Ishoyahb

Personal details
- Born: 15th century
- Died: 5 August 1538
- Buried: Rabban Hormizd Monastery
- Residence: Rabban Hormizd Monastery

Mar Shemʿon VI (also written Shimun VI) was Patriarch of the Church of the East from 1504 until his death on 5 August 1538. Shemon is credited with revising the East Syriac Rite, replacing commemorations of traditional saints and martyrs with new ones, especially for those who had founded monasteries. Following his death, he was succeeded as Patriarch by his brother Shemon VII Ishoyahb, who had been natar kursya (designated successor) throughout his reign; since the reign of Shemon IV the role of Patriarch had been passed hereditarily. Shemon VI was buried alongside other Patriarchs of his era at Rabban Hormizd Monastery near Mosul, his residence while he had been Patriarch; his epitaph, recorded by Vosté, was inscribed by a priest named Israel.

== Bibliography ==
- Baum, Wilhelm; Winkler, Dietmar W. (2003). The Church of the East: A Concise History. London-New York: Routledge-Curzon. ISBN 978-1-134-43019-2.
- Burleson, Samuel; Van Rompay, Lucas (2011). "List of Patriarchs of the Main Syriac Churches in the Middle East". Gorgias Encyclopedic Dictionary of the Syriac Heritage. Piscataway, NJ: Gorgias Press. pp. 481–491.
- Murre van den Berg, Heleen H. L. (1999). "The Patriarchs of the Church of the East from the Fifteenth to Eighteenth Centuries" (PDF). Hugoye: Journal of Syriac Studies. 2 (2): 235–264. doi:10.31826/hug-2010-020119. S2CID 212688640.
- Wilmshurst, David (2000). The Ecclesiastical Organisation of the Church of the East, 1318–1913. Louvain: Peeters Publishers. ISBN 978-90-429-0876-5.
- Wilmshurst, David (2011). The Martyred Church: A History of the Church of the East. London: East & West Publishing Limited. ISBN 978-1-907318-04-7.
- Wilmshurst, David (2019). "The patriarchs of the Church of the East". The Syriac World. London: Routledge. pp. 799–805. ISBN 978-1-138-89901-8.

Church of the East titles
Preceded by Eliya V (1502–1504)	Catholicos-Patriarch of the East (1504–1538)	Succeeded by Shemon VII Ishoyahb (1538–1558)
