= Shemon VII Ishoyahb =

Mar Shemon VII Ishoyahb
- Patriarch of the Church of the East
- Church: Church of the East
- Installed: 1539
- Term ended: 1558
- Predecessor: Shemon VI
- Successor: Eliya VI
- Other post: Metropolitan of Mosul

Personal details
- Born: Īshōʿyahb bar Māmā end of the 15th century
- Died: 1558
- Buried: Rabban Hormizd Monastery
- Residence: Rabban Hormizd Monastery

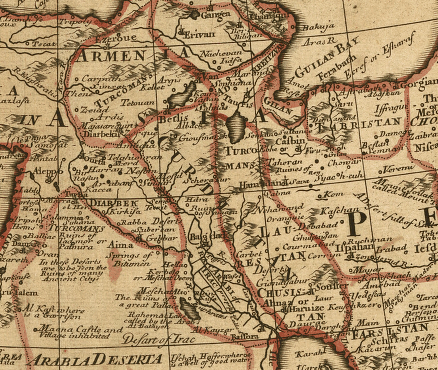
The country of the Church of the East: detail from a map of 1721

Mar Shemʿon VII Ishoʿyahb (Classical Syriac: ܫܡܥܘܢ ܫܒܝܥܝܐ ܝܫܘܥܝܗܒ), born Īshōʿyahb bar Māmā, was Patriarch of the Church of the East from 1539 to 1558, with residence in Rabban Hormizd Monastery.

His reign was widely unpopular, and discontent with his leadership led to the schism of 1552, in which his opponents rebelled and appointed the monk Shimun Yohannan Sulaqa as a rival patriarch. Sulaqa's subsequent consecration by Pope Julius III resulted in permanent split between Catholics and separatists in the Church of the East, and the separation of the Chaldean Catholic Church. His body is buried in the Rabban Hormizd Monastery near Alqosh, modern Iraq, which now belongs to the Chaldean Catholic Church after Patriarch Shemon VII's Catholic descendant, Yohannan Hormizd, eventually became patriarch of that Chaldean Catholic Church.

== Guardian of the throne and metropolitan of Mosul ==
Shemʿon Ishoʿyahb was the younger brother of the patriarch Shemʿon VI (1504–38). Throughout his brother's reign Shemʿon was his designated successor or natar kursya ('guardian of the throne'). He is first mentioned as natar kursya in a manuscript colophon of 1504, at the very beginning of his brother's reign. In October 1538, two months after the death of Shemʿon VI on 5 August 1538, he is mentioned as metropolitan of Mosul. It is not clear whether he became metropolitan of Mosul before or after his brother's death.

== Patriarch ==
Shemʿon Ishoʿyahb succeeded his brother as patriarch either at the end of 1538 or, more probably, early in 1539. He is first mentioned as patriarch in a manuscript colophon of 1539. He took the name Shemʿon VII Ishoʿyahb. At this period the patriarchal succession in the Church of the East was hereditary, normally from uncle to nephew or from brother to brother. This practice, which had been introduced in the middle of the fifteenth century by the patriarch Shemʿon IV Basidi (died 1497), eventually resulted in a shortage of eligible heirs and in 1552 provoked a schism in the Church. Shemʿon VII Ishoʿyahb caused great offence at the beginning of his reign by designating his twelve-year-old nephew Hnanishoʿ as his successor, presumably because no older relatives were available. Several years later, probably because Hnanishoʿ had died in the interim, he transferred the succession to his other nephew, fifteen-year-old Eliya, the future patriarch Eliya VI (1558–1591). His opponents further accused him of crimes such as selling ecclesiastical positions, allowing the practice of concubinage, and general intemperance.

== Schism of 1552 ==
In 1552 a section of the Church of the East, angered by Shemʿon VII Ishoʿyahb's misbehaviour, revolted against his authority. The prime movers in the rebellion were unnamed bishops of Erbil, Salmas and Adarbaigan, and they were supported by 'many' priests and monks from Baghdad, Kirkuk, Gazarta, Nisibis, Mardin, Amid, Hesna d'Kifa and Seert. These were urban centres where there was little respect for the principle of hereditary succession to the patriarchate.

The rebels elected Shimun Yohannan Sulaqa, the superior of the monastery of Rabban Hormizd near Alqosh, in opposition to Shemʿon VII Ishoʿyahb, but were unable to consecrate him as no bishop of metropolitan rank was available, as canonically required. Franciscan missionaries were already at work among the Nestorians, and they persuaded Sulaqa's supporters to legitimize their position by seeking Sulaqa's consecration by Pope Julius III (1550–5). Sulaqa went to Rome, where he made a satisfactory Catholic profession of faith and presented a letter, drafted by his supporters in Mosul, which set out his claims to be recognized as patriarch. This letter, which has survived in the Vatican archives, grossly distorted the truth. The rebels claimed that the Nestorian patriarch Shemʿon VII Ishoʿyahb had died in 1551 and had been succeeded illegitimately by 'Shemʿon VIII Denha' (1551–8), a non-existent patriarch invented purely for the purpose of bolstering the legitimacy of Shimun Yohannan Sulaqa's election. The Vatican was taken in by this fraud, and consecrated Shimun Yohannan Sulaqa as 'patriarch of Mosul' and founding patriarch of the Chaldean Catholic Church in April 1553 in Rome, thereby creating a permanent schism in the Church of the East.

He returned to Mesopotamia towards the end of the same year. In December 1553 he obtained documents from the Ottoman authorities recognising him as an independent 'Chaldean' patriarch, and in 1554, during a stay of five months in Amid, consecrated five metropolitan bishops (for the dioceses of Gazarta, Hesna d'Kifa, Amid, Mardin and Seert). Shemʿon VII Ishoʿyahb responded by consecrating two more underage members of the patriarchal family as metropolitans for Nisibis and Gazarta. He also won over the governor of ʿAmadiya, who invited Sulaqa to ʿAmadiya, imprisoned him for four months, and put him to death in January 1555.

The Vatican only discovered that Shemʿon VII Ishoʿyahb was still alive two years after Shimun VIII Yohannan Sulaqa's appointment. 12 January 1555, shortly after Shimun VIII Yohannan Sulaqa's murder, the Franciscan friar Ambrose Buttigeg wrote to Pope Julius III with the news that 'Shemʿon Bar Mama' was still alive:

Your holiness will be shocked to learn that, contrary to what your holiness, the most reverend cardinals, and the rest of you were told, the old patriarch never died at all, and has recently murdered the said Simon Sulaqa.

== Shemon's death and succession ==
Shemʿon VII Ishoʿyahb died on Wednesday, 1 November 1558, and was succeeded as patriarch by his nephew and natar kursya (designated successor) Eliya VI (1558–1591). His body was buried in the Rabban Hormizd Monastery near Alqosh, where his tomb can still be seen, alongside those of several other patriarchs of the Shemʿon line. His epitaph, published by Vosté in 1930, contains a conventional Nestorian profession of faith.

== See also ==
- List of patriarchs of the Church of the East

== Notes ==
Church of the East titles
| Preceded by Shemon VI (1504–1538) | Catholicos-Patriarch of the East; 1539–58 | Succeeded by Eliya VI (1558–1591) |
