= Nestorian Evangelion =

16th-century illuminated East Syriac Gospel Book

- Bibliothèque nationale de France, MS syr. 344
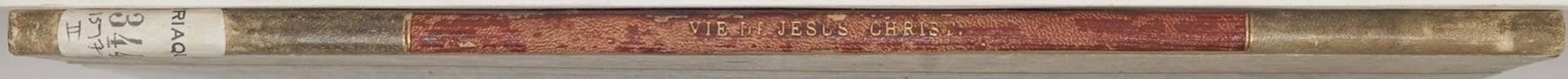
- The spine with the title Vie de Jésus-Christ
- Also known as: Vie de Jésus-Christ
- Type: Gospel Book
- Date: 16th century
- Language(s): Syriac; Armenian
- Size: 31.2 cm × 19.8 cm
- Script: Syriac; Armenian
- Contents: Life of Jesus

The Nestorian Evangelion (French: Évangéliaire nestorien, also known as Vie de Jésus-Christ ['Life of Jesus Christ']; Paris, Bibliothèque nationale de France, MS syr. 344) is a 16th-century Church of the East Gospel Book which contains 18 illustrations depicting the life of Jesus Christ, with captions in Syriac (larger in size) and Armenian. The manuscript was donated by the Chaldean Catholic archbishop Addaï Scher to the Bibliothèque nationale de France in 1909.

== Introduction ==
The manuscript consists of 10 folios measuring 31.2 centimetres (12.3 in) by 19.8 centimetres (7.8 in), f1r and f10v (f9v) are blank. According to Jules Leroy, this manuscript would be an illustrated section of a Syriac Gospel Book the MS Syriac No. 15 kept by the Chaldean Patriarchate of Mosul. The 18 illustrations would have been originally attached to the end of that Gospel Book of Mosul. If the belonging to the Gospel of Mosul is proven, this manuscript could date back to the year 1497 AD (1806 AG) and have been copied in the village of 'WRG, in the diocese of Siirt at the time of the patriarch Mar Simeon (Shemon IV or Shemon V), and of Mar Yuḥanon, the bishop of Athel, by someone named Abraham who is the son of Dodo.

== Illustrations ==
The eighteen illustrations:

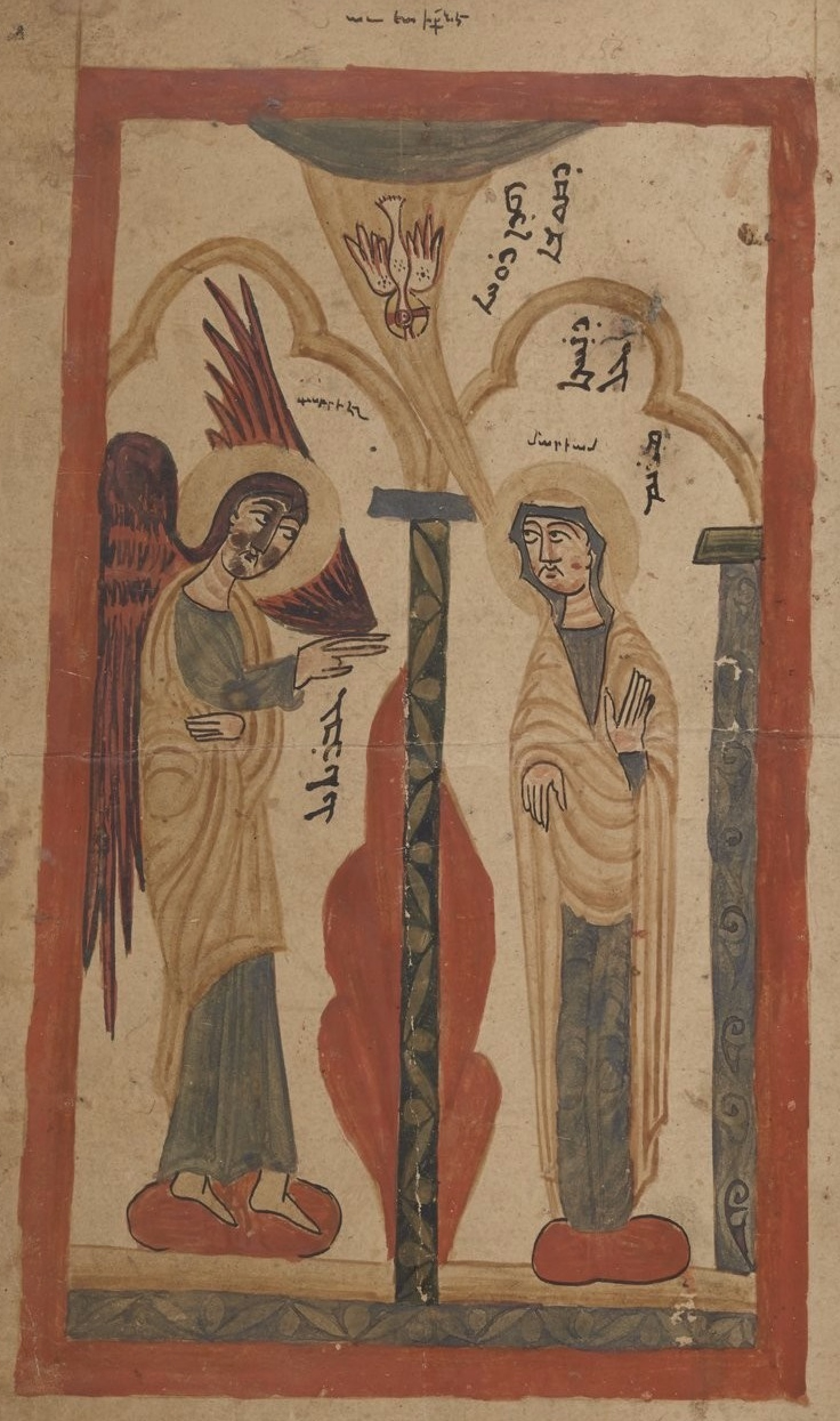
Folio 1v: Annunciation

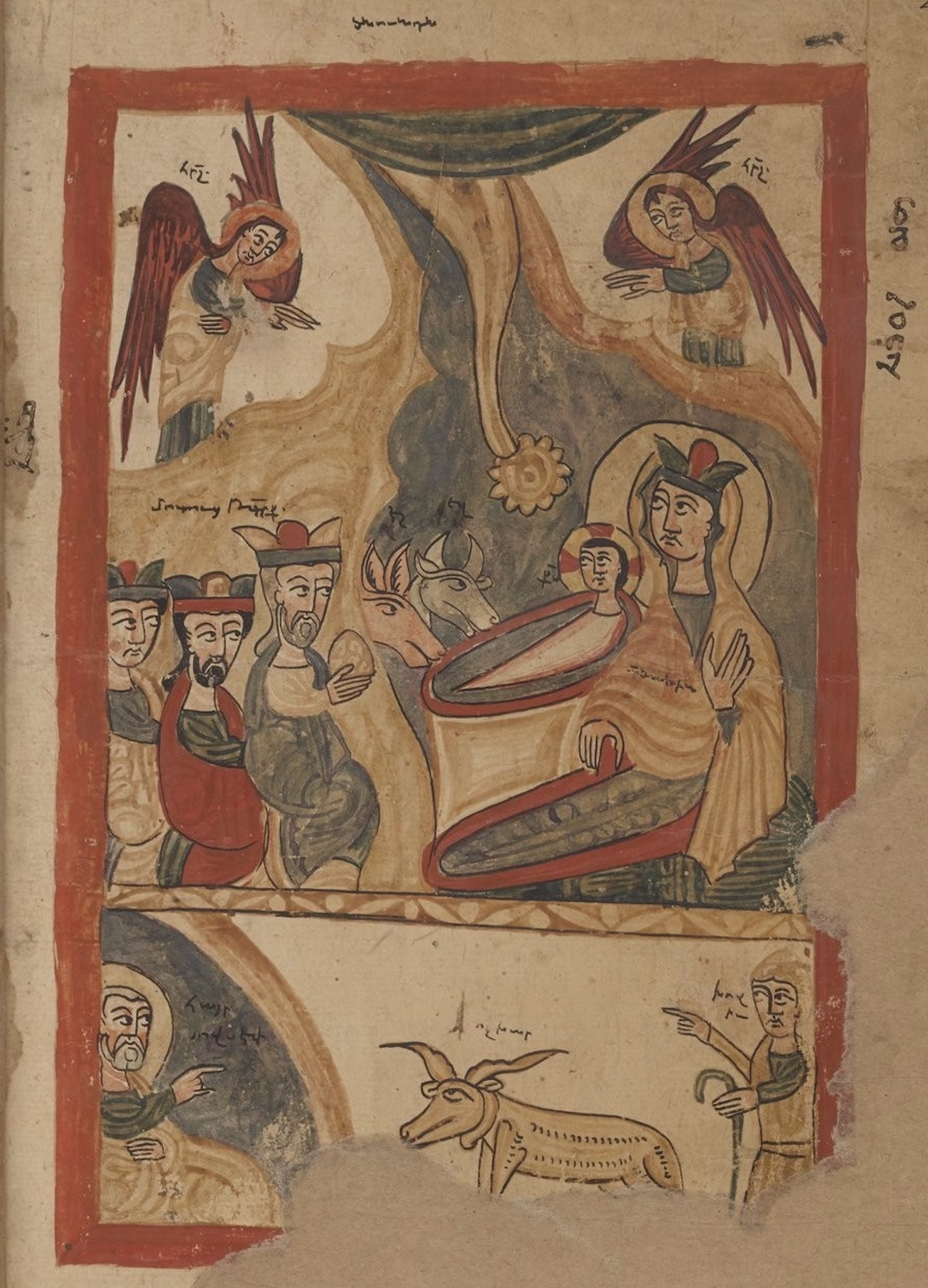
Folio 2r: Adoration of the Magi

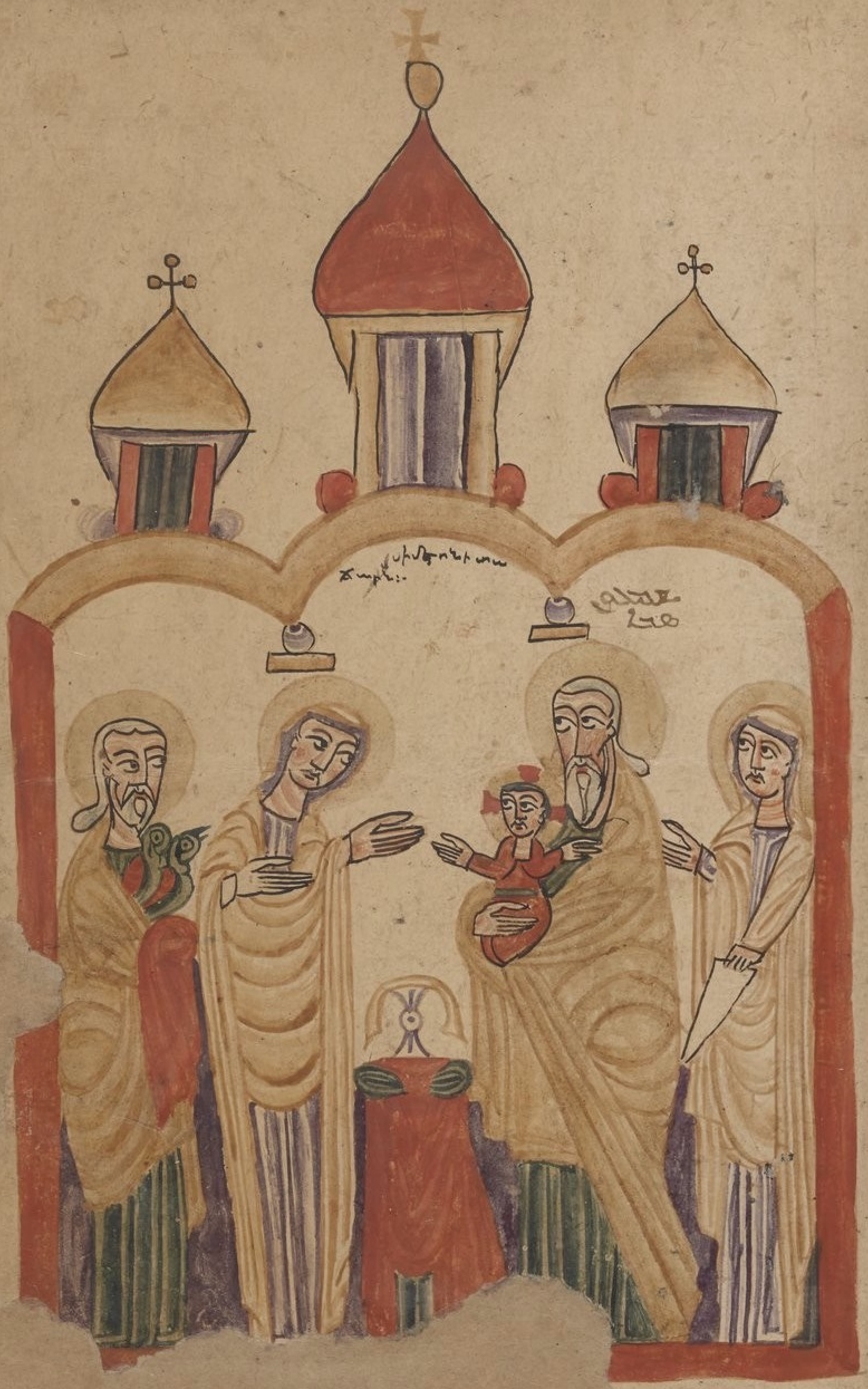
Folio 2v: Presentation of Jesus at the Temple

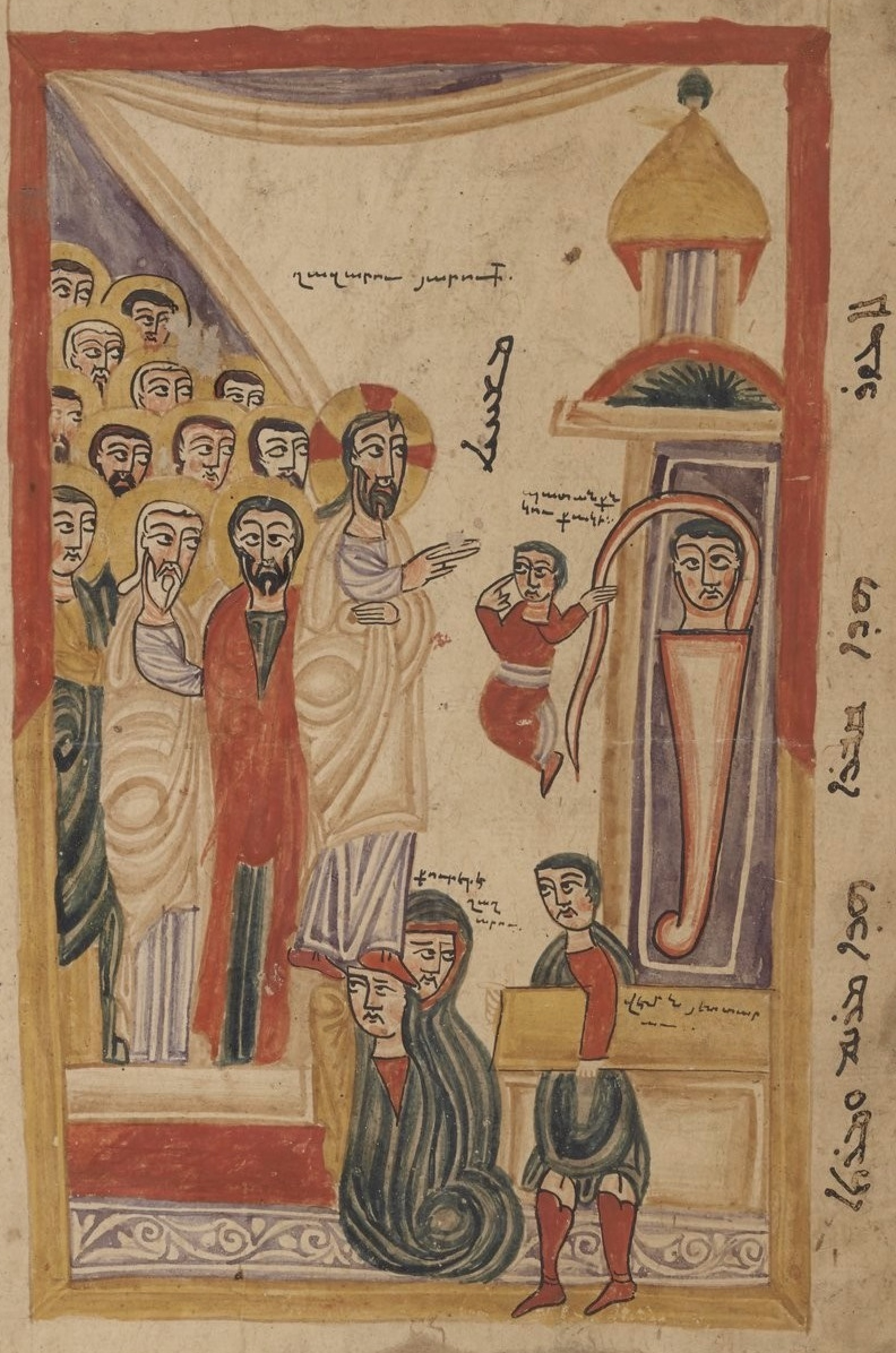
Folio 3r: Resurrection of Lazarus

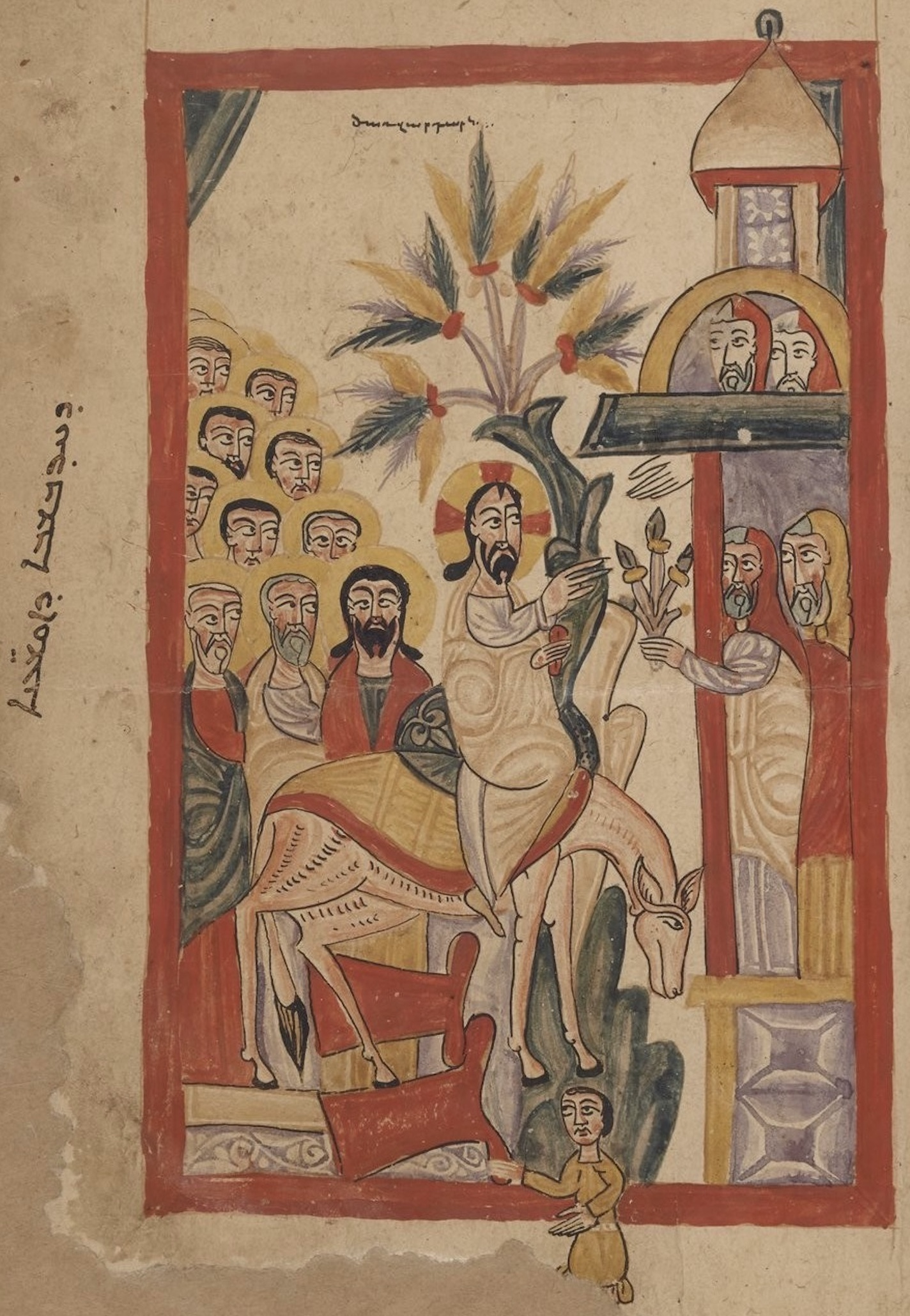
Folio 3v: Triumphal entry into Jerusalem

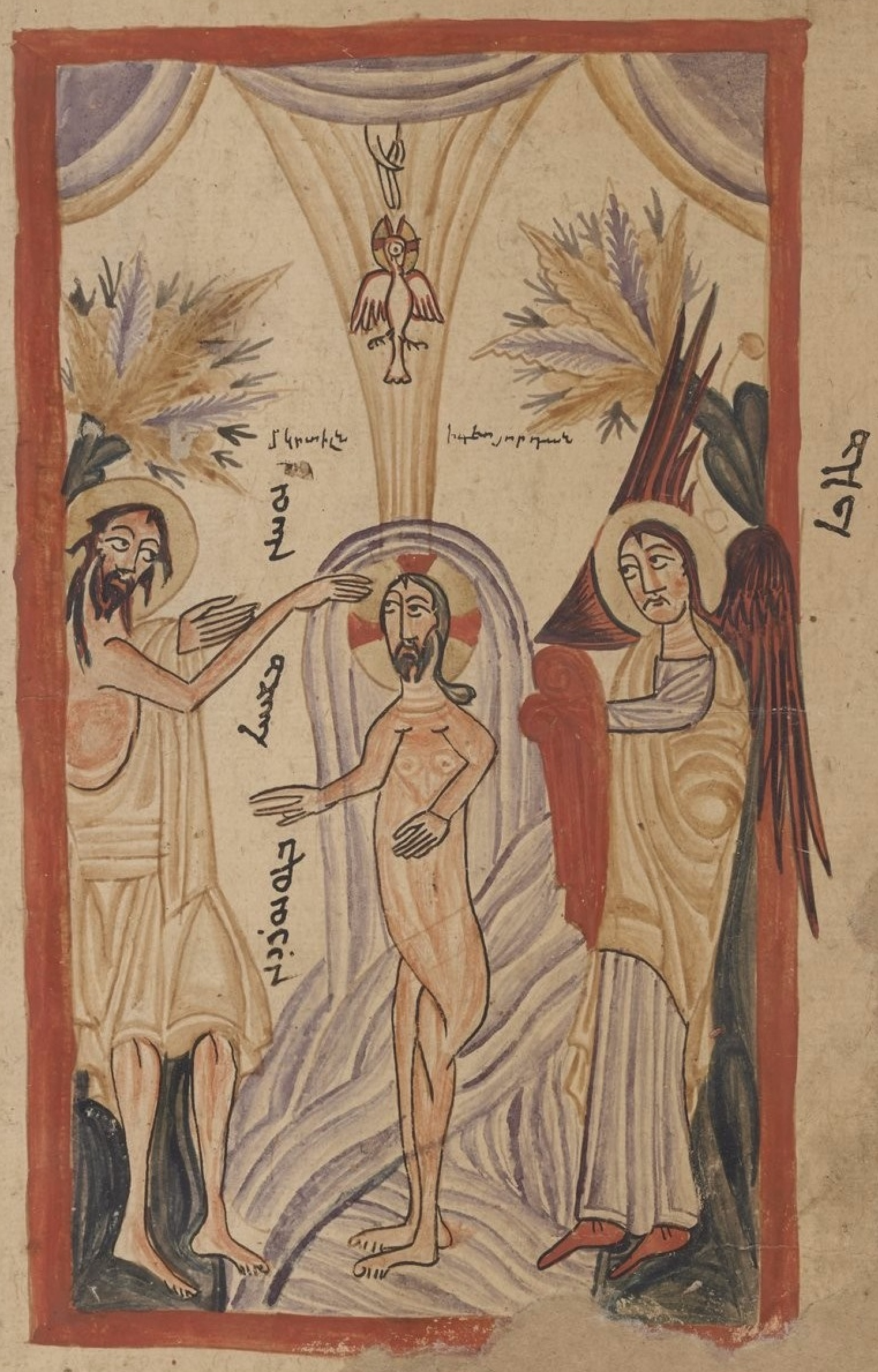
Folio 3bis r: Baptism of Jesus

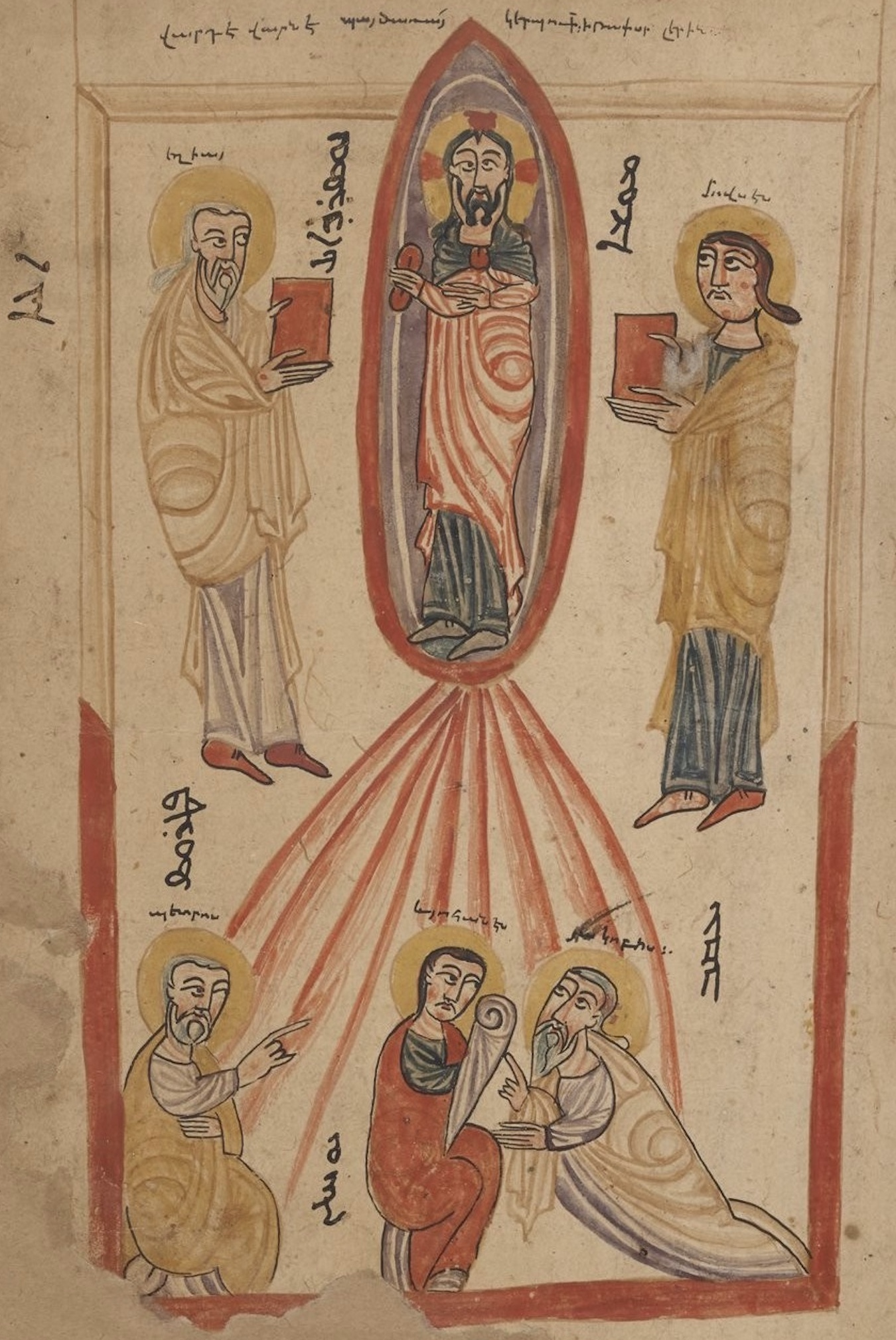
Folio 3bis v: Transfiguration of Jesus

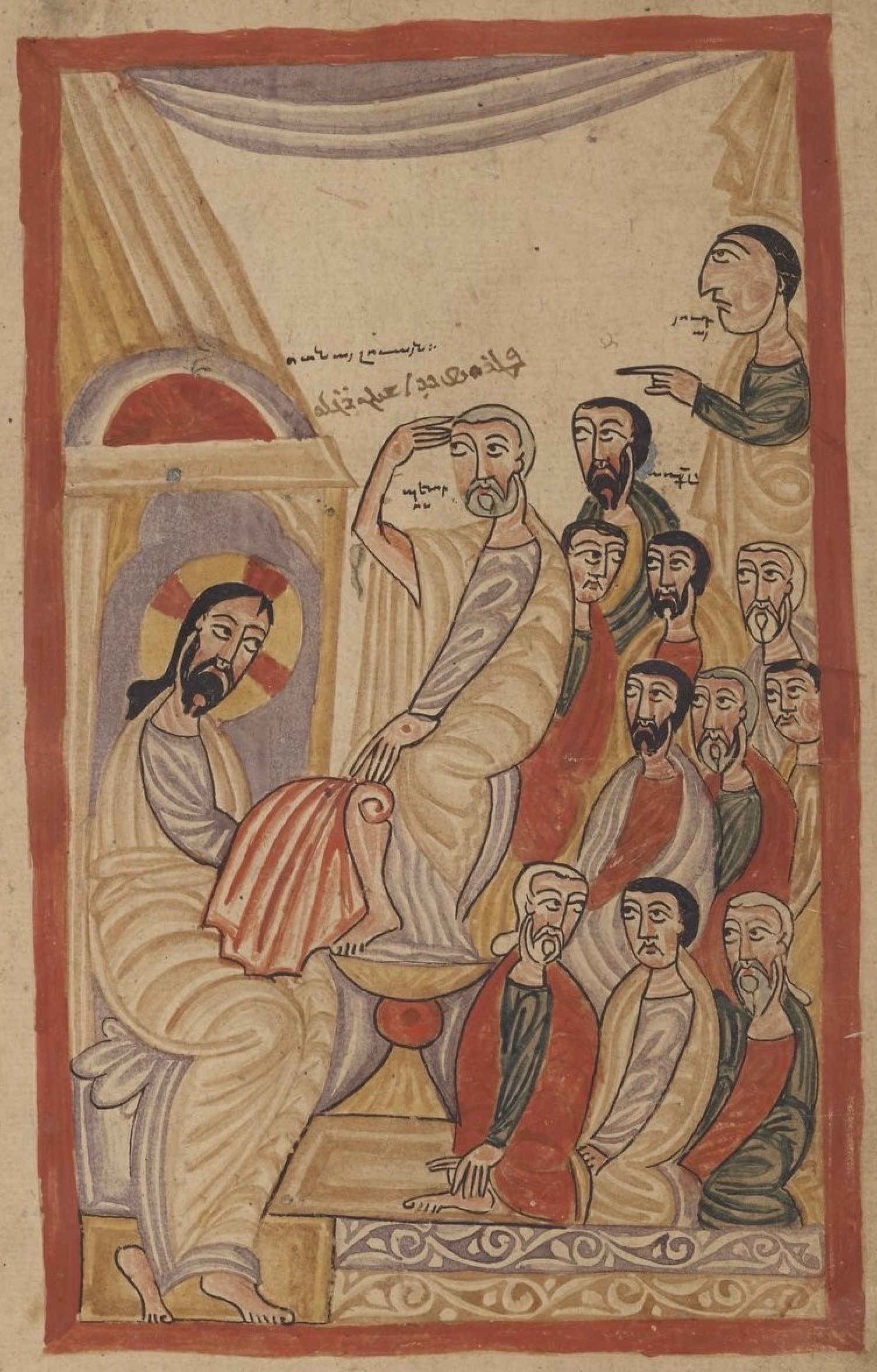
Folio 4r: Washing of the Feet

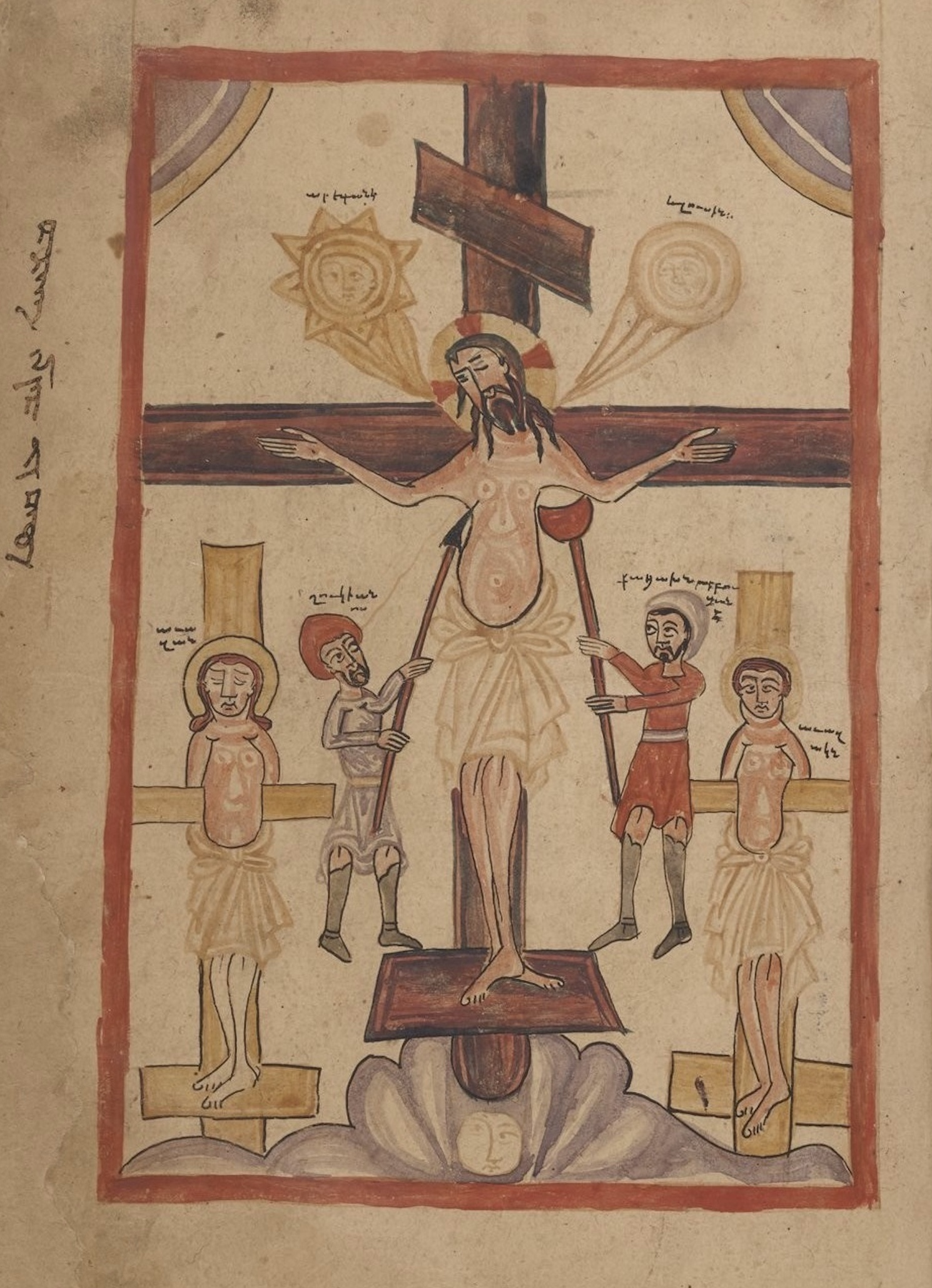
Folio 4v: Crucifixion of Jesus

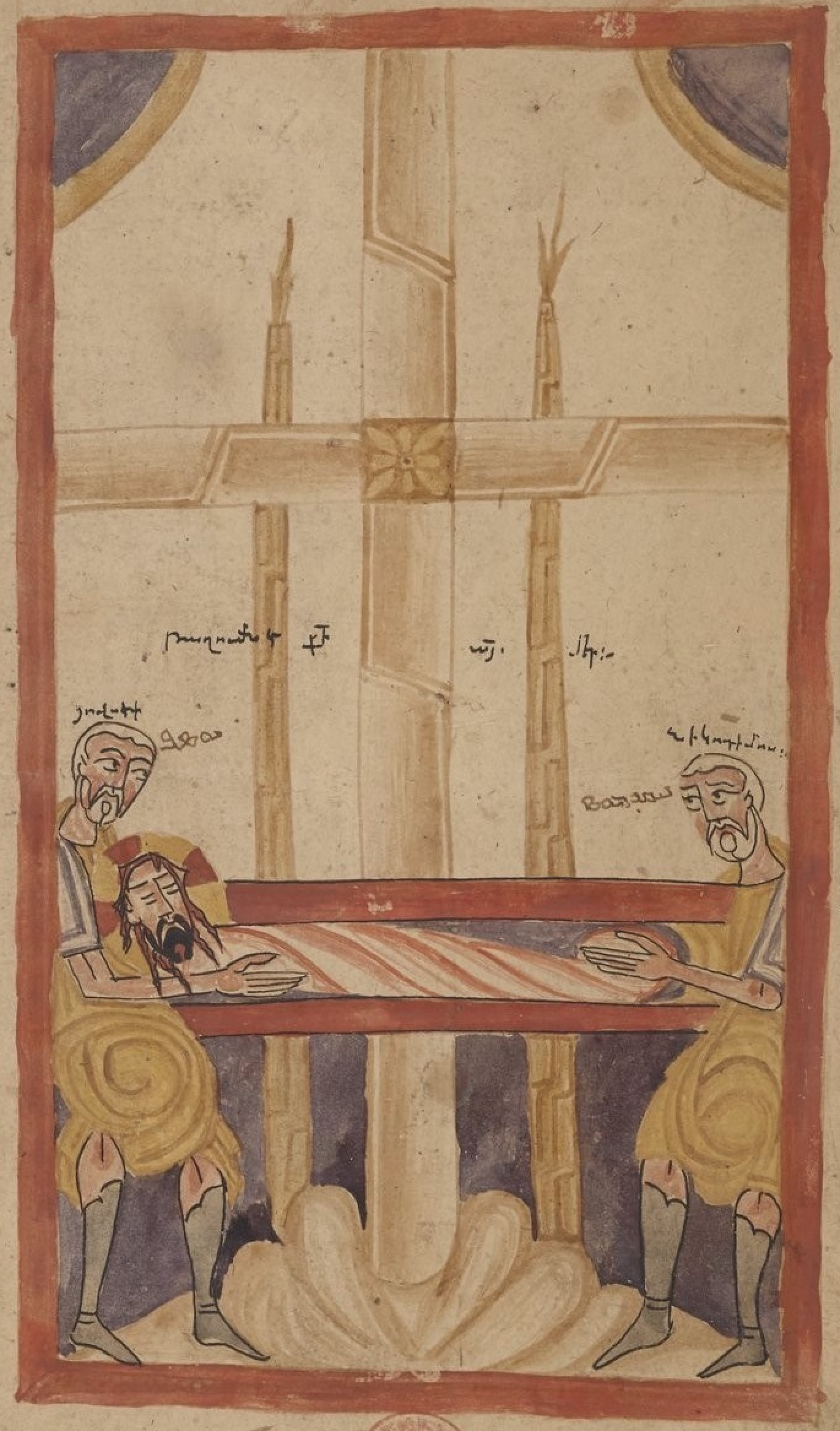
Folio 5r: Burial of Jesus

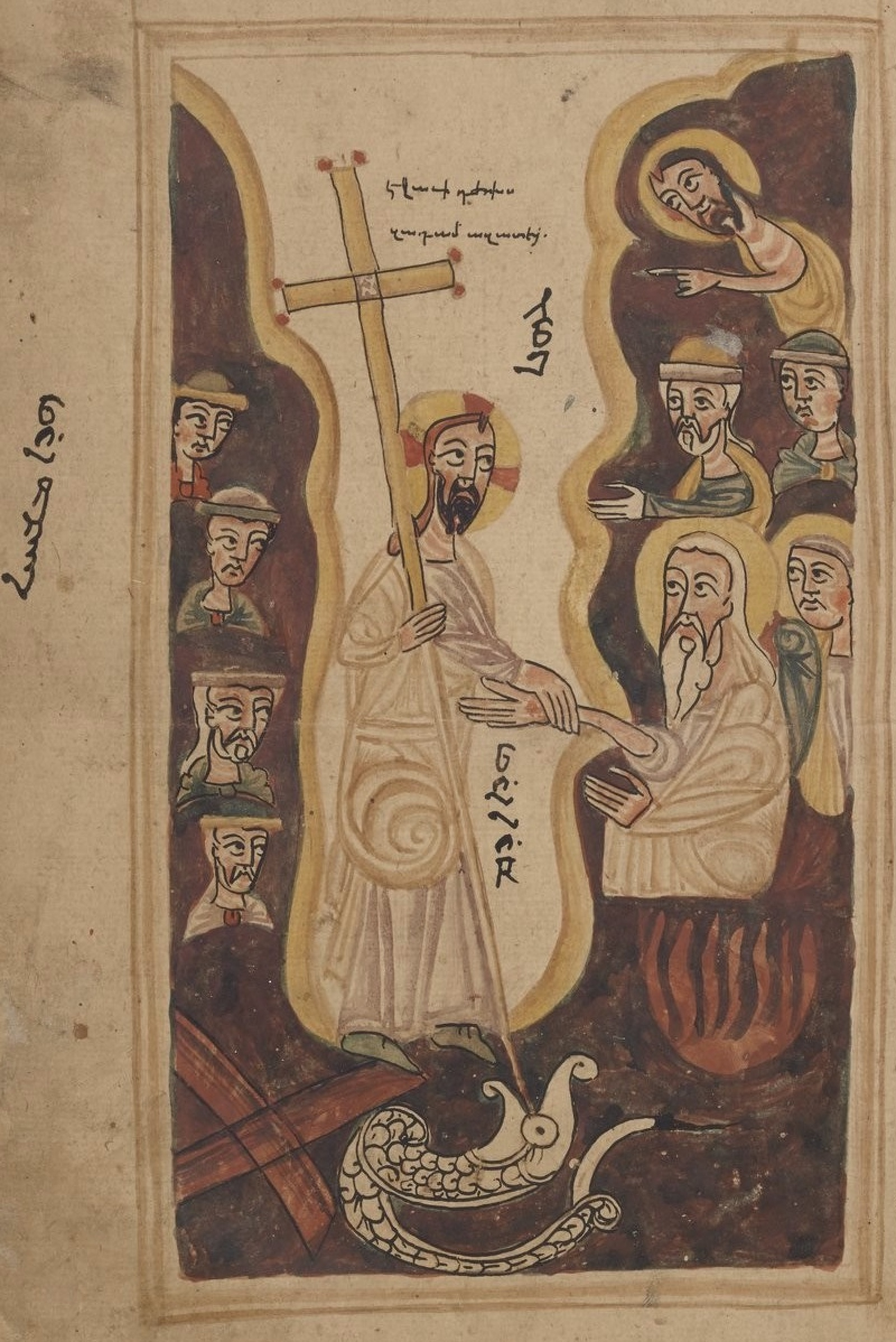
Folio 5v: Harrowing of Hell

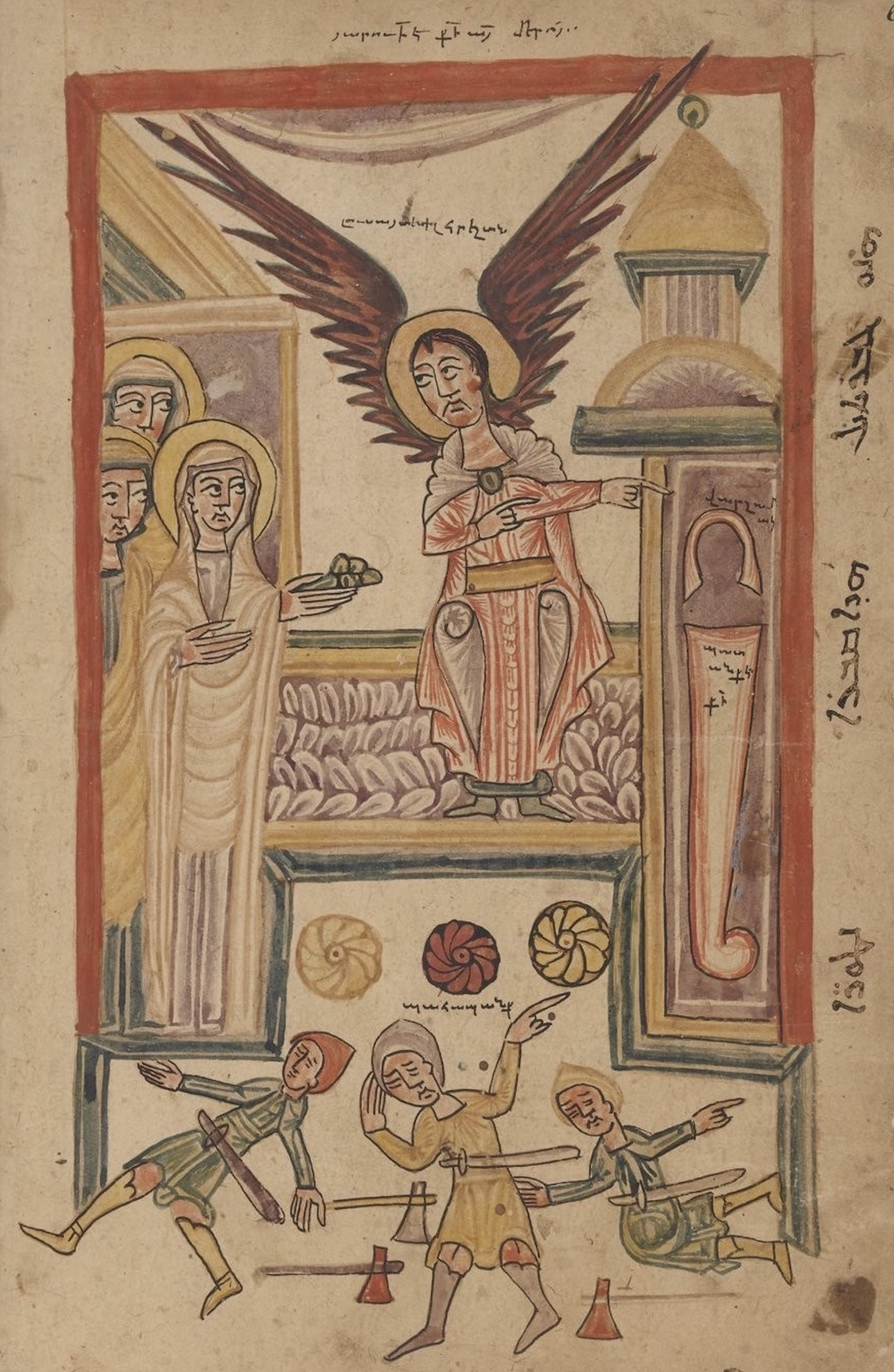
Folio 6r: Holy Women at Christ's Tomb

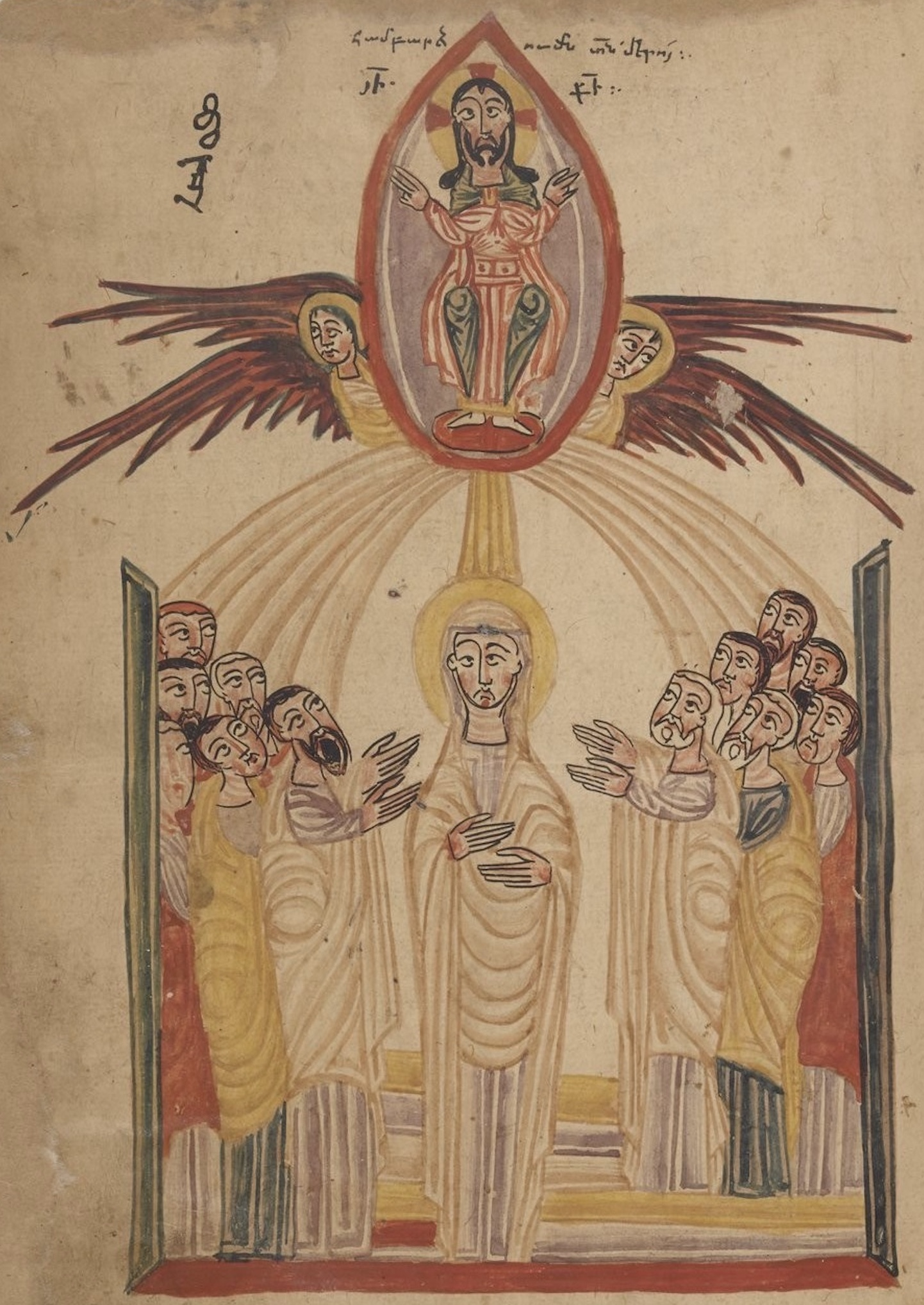
Folio 6v: Ascension of Jesus

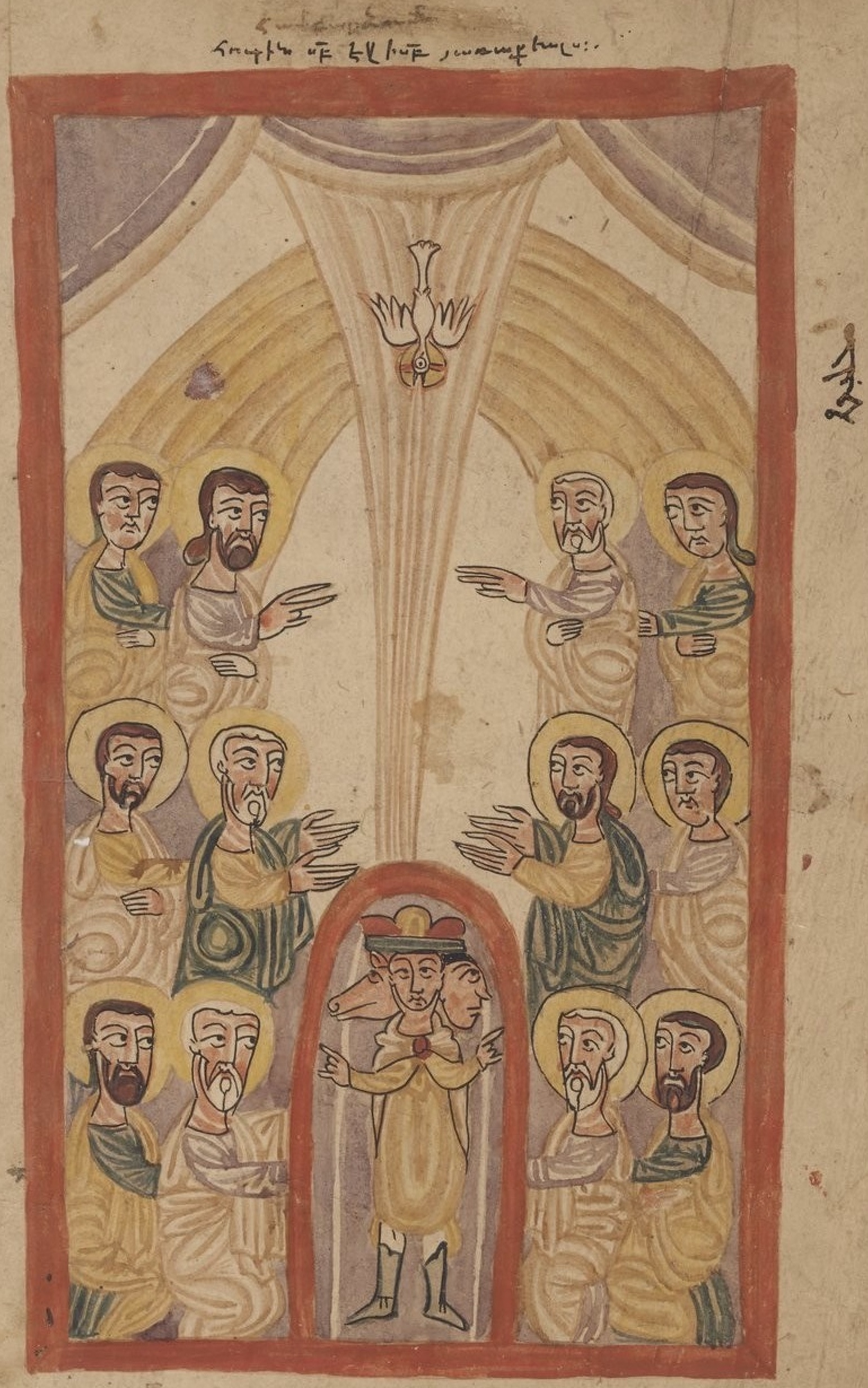
Folio 7r: Pentecost

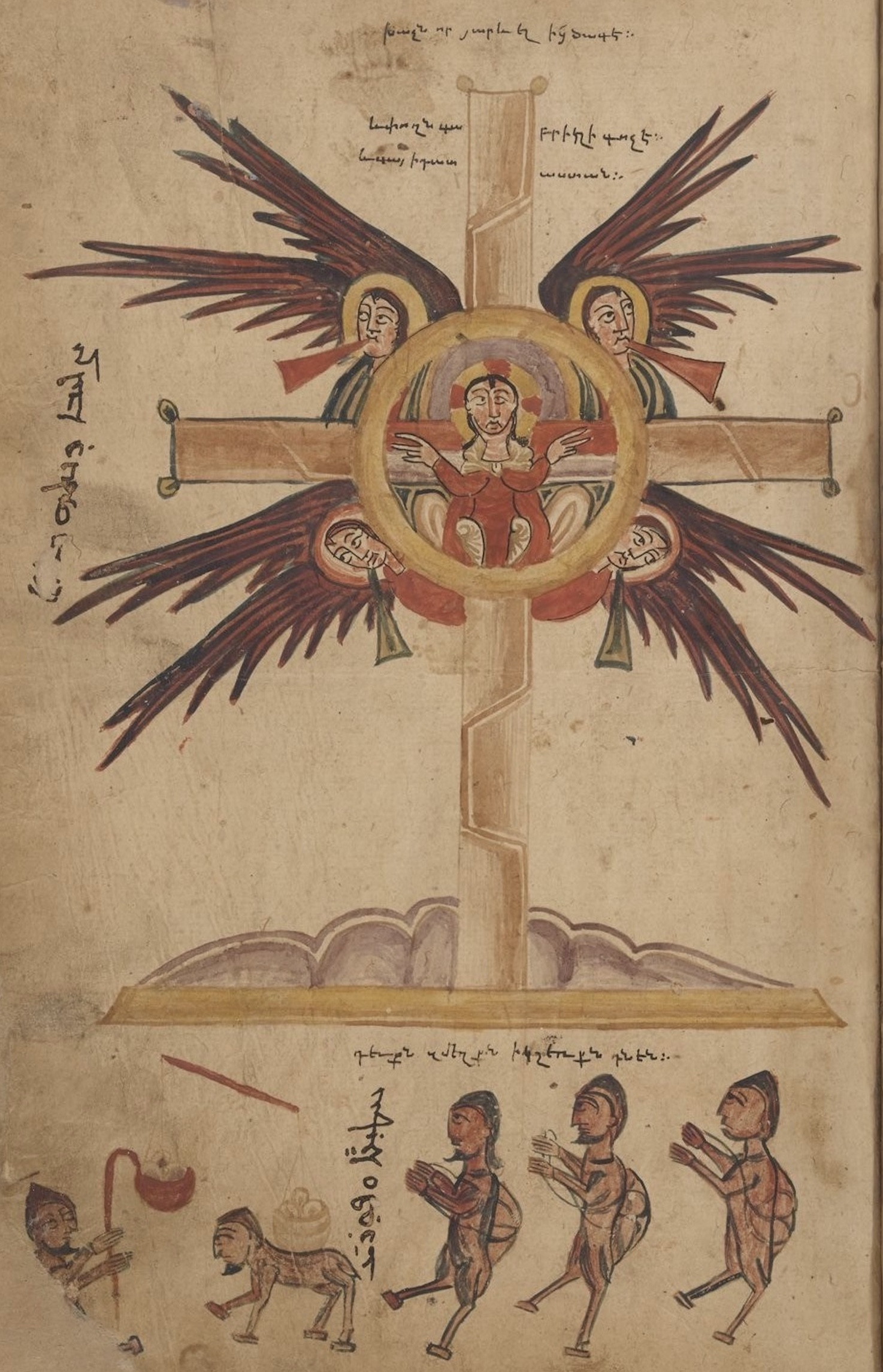
Folio 7v: Last Judgment

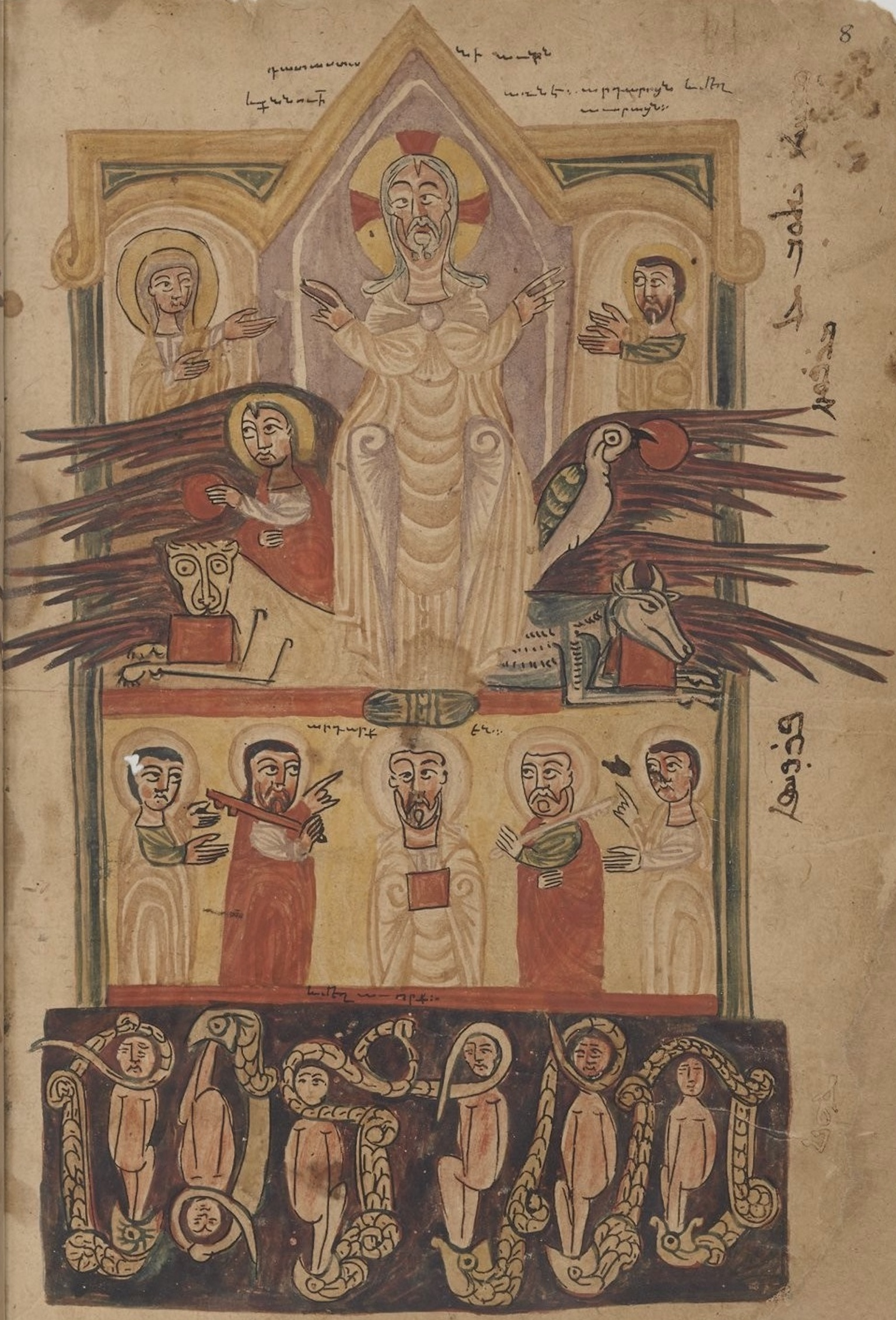
Folio 8r: Last Judgment

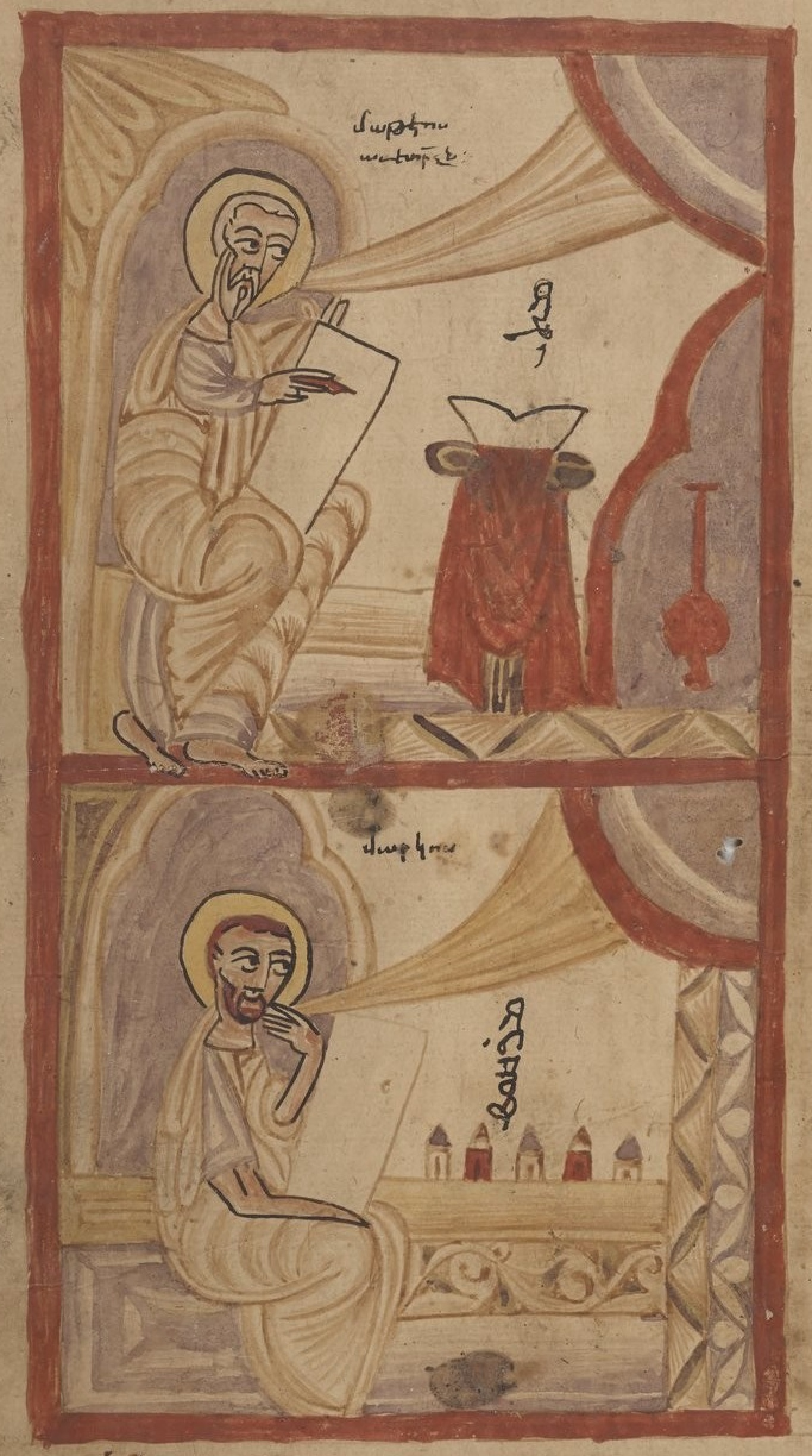
Folio 8v: Saint Matthew Writing; Saint Mark

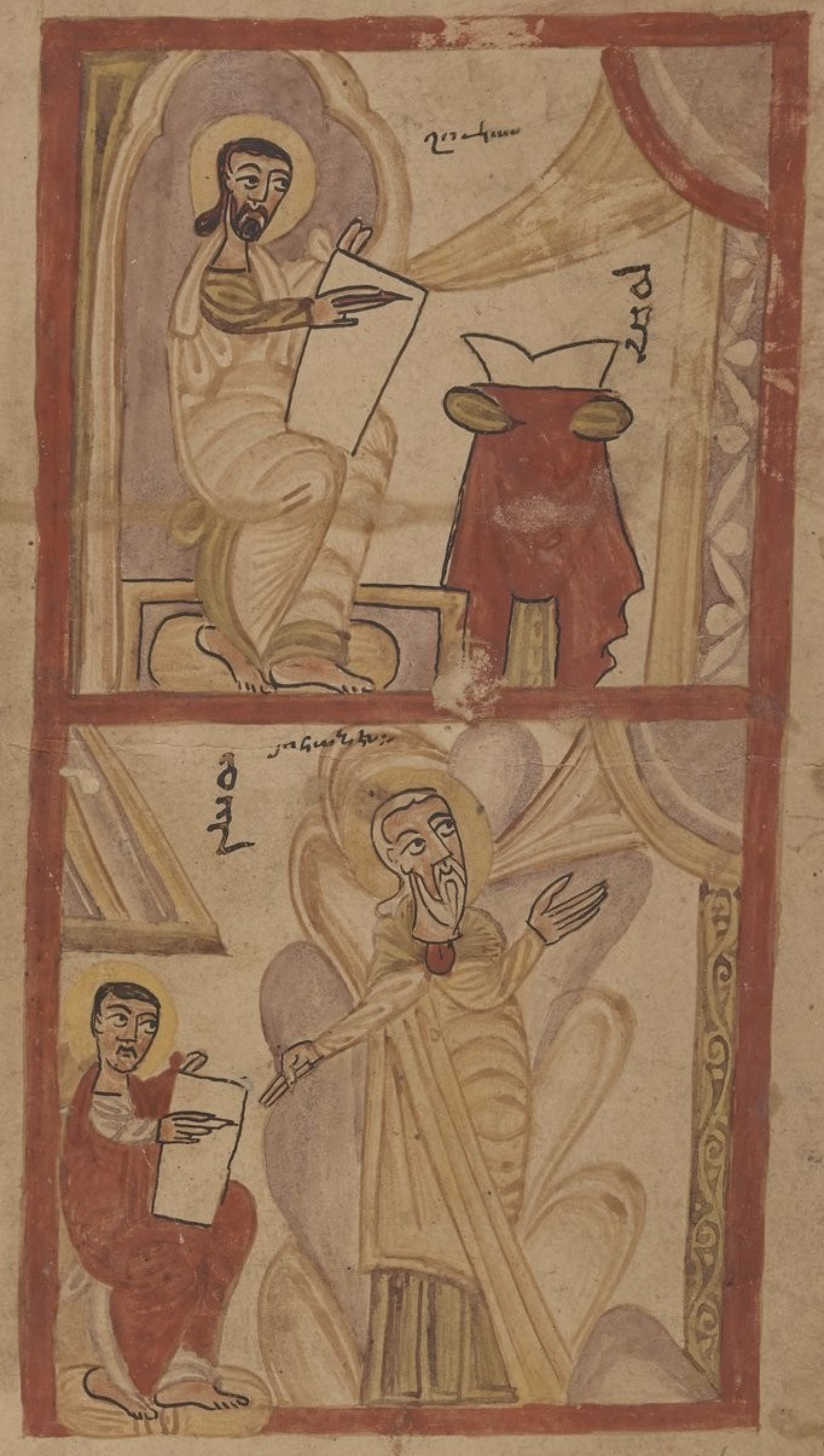
Folio 9r: Saint Luke; Saint John and Saint Prochorus

== See also ==
- Rabbula Gospels
- Syriac Bible of Paris
