= Elias V =

Elias V may refer to:

- Count Elias V of Périgord (1136–1205)
- Eliya V, patriarch of the Church of the East (1502–1504)
