= Shimun VIII Yohannan Sulaqa =

Head of the Chaldean Catholic Church from 1553 to 1555

Mar Shimun VIII Yohannan Sulaqa
- Chaldean Catholic Patriarch of Babylon; Patriarch of Mosul in Eastern Syria; Patriarch of the Church of the Chaldeans of Mosul; Patriarch of the Eastern Assyrians
- Church: Church of the East/Chaldean Catholic Church
- See: Amid of the Chaldeans
- Installed: 28 April 1553
- Term ended: January 1555
- Successor: Abdisho IV Maron

Personal details
- Born: Yohannan Sulaqa; Circa 1510 Mosul
- Died: January 1555 Amadiya
- Residence: Amid, Ottoman Empire (now Diyarbakır, Turkey)

Shimun VIII Yohannan Sulaqa (Classical Syriac: ܫܡܥܘܢ ܬܡܝܢܝܐ ܝܘܚܢܢ ܣܘܠܩܐ; Latin: Simeon Sulacha; also Yohannan d'Bēth Bello (Syriac: ܝܘܚܢܢ ܕܒܝܬ ܒܠܘ), John Soulaqa, Sulaka or Sulacha; circa 1510–1555) was the first Patriarch of what was to become the Shemʿon line of the Chaldean Catholic Church, from 1553 to 1555, after it absorbed this Church of the East patriarchate into full communion with the Holy See and the Catholic Church.

Yohannan Sulaqa's ascension as Patriarch was part of the Schism of 1552 in the Church of the East, which resulted in the establishment of rival patriarchates and ultimately a permanent rift in the Church of the East. He was elected by those who opposed the hereditary patriarchal succession within the Eliya family. He took an unprecedented step in the Church of the East: he traveled to Rome, accepted the Catholic creed, and was consecrated as Patriarch in 1553 after at first failing in an attempt to join the Syriac Orthodox Church.

His reign did not last long though. Upon his return, due to strong opposition by the opposing Patriarch, Sulaqa was imprisoned by the Ottoman leader of Amadiya, tortured, and executed in January 1555. He is considered a martyr of the Catholic Church.

== Background ==
Up until the Schism of 1552, the Church of the East was united in a single patriarchate, and the episcopal see was located in the ancient city of Alqosh. However, by the end of the 15th century, the Patriarch Shimun IV Basidi (1437–1493) decided to make the office hereditary in his own family, the Eliya line.

This was made possible through the ancient canon law of the Church of the East, which decreed that only metropolitan bishops could confirm a patriarch. As a result, Shimun IV and his successor only appointed their family members as metropolitan bishops, for the uncle to choose his brothers or nephews to succeed him as patriarch. This designated successor, once consecrated as metropolitan bishop with right of succession, was called natar kursi.

The patriarch Shemon VII Ishoyahb, consecrated either towards the end of 1538 or early in 1539, was highly unpopular due to his illicit activities and profligate life, selling church properties, and using concubines. Furthermore, he consecrated his nephews at the ages of twelve and fifteen as metropolitan bishops. These actions led to wide protest, causing further upheaval and instability in the church.

== Life ==
Yohannan Sulaqa (The name "Sulaqa" means "Ascension") was born c. 1510 in the Mosul region of northern Mesopotamia. Around 1540 he became abbot of Rabban Hormizd Monastery near Alqosh. A single source, Abdisho IV Maron, says he was a monk of the monastery of Sabrishoʿ at Beth Qoqa, near Arbela.

Widespread complaints emerged against Shimun VII's consecration of his younger nephew as his designated successor. This led to three non-related bishops of Shimun VII (the bishops of Erbil, Urmia and Salmas) calling an assembly in Mosul of clergy, monks, and church members from ten regions to elect the hesitant Yohannan Sulaqa as the new patriarch. However, A bishop of metropolitan rank was needed at the ceremony to consecrate Sulaqa as patriarch. As the Eliya family would object to it, Yohannan Sulaqa asked Pope Julius III of Rome to celebrate the consecration.

Yohannan Sulaqa, along with seventy delegates, traveled to Jerusalem to meet the Custodian of the Holy Land. The group managed to persuade the Franciscan friars that they agreed with the Catholic faith, and expressed the desire to have Sulaqa confirmed as patriarch by the pope. The Friars gave them a letter of presentation to the pope and Sulaqa traveled to Rome, where Andreas Masius assisted him as a translator in the court of Pope Julius III.

Yohannan Sulaqa requested that the pope consecrate him as patriarch. He justified this request by saying that, after Shemon VII Ishoyahb died in 1551, his 8-year-old nephew who was his designated successor also died. For this reason many historians such as Eugène Tisserant, Tfinkdji, and Fiey postulate the existence of one Shimun (VIII) who reigned in Alqosh from 1552 to 1558. Becchetti himself says that in reality the designated successor was neither an 8-year-old nor was he dead. More recent scholars such as Habbi and Lampar, suggest that Shimun VII did not die in 1551 but reigned till 1558, and that Sulaqa had lied to the pope.

On February 20, 1553, Yohannan Sulaqa made a profession of faith before the Pope. On April 9, 1553, he was consecrated as bishop in St. Peter's Basilica in Rome by Cardinal John Álvarez y Alva de Toledo, OP (1488–1557) (or by the pope himself according other sources). Sulaqa's appointment as patriarch was ratified by the papal bull entitled "Divina disponente clementia". In the course of the papal consistory held on April 28, 1553, Sulaqa received the pallium, i.e., the sign of his patriarchal authority, from the hands of the pope.

He took the regnal name Shimʿun, adopted by all his successors except his immediate successor until the late 20th century. The successors of Shimʿun VII all took the name Eliya.

Yohannan Sulaqa traveled back via Constantinople to the northern town of Amid (now Diyarbakır), where he arrived on November 12, 1553, and established his See. He was accompanied by the bishop Ambrose Buttigeg, OP († 1558), a powerful Maltese clergyman, who was specially appointed as "Nuncio for Mosul."

However, in January 1555, he was summoned, imprisoned for many months, tortured, and executed, probably by drowning, by the local pasha of Amadiya instigated by the partisans of Shimun VII. He had just ordained five metropolitans as the basis of a new church structure. In the Catholic Church, he is often considered a martyr but has not been officially declared such by the inclusion of his name in the Roman Martyrology.

Sulaqa's brother, Joseph Mar (Sulaqa) of India, held the office from 1556 to 1569 of Metropolitan of the Saint Thomas Christians in South India.

== Title ==
Yohannan Sulaqa was pointedly given the title of "Patriarch of Mosul and Athur" in Rome, not in a restrictive sense, but meaning of the Church of the East, and at that time, Kerala aside, was exclusive to northern Mesopotamia, the former Assyria. The Chronicle of the Carmelites states that Sulaqa was proclaimed Patriarch of the Eastern Assyrians but on April 19, 1553, the title was changed to Patriarch of the Chaldeans. This was in reference to the Old Testament which gives Abraham's birthplace as "Ur of Chaldees" (traditionally Edessa) at a time long before the Chaldeans entered Mesopotamia. This did not signify any ethnic or geographic link with the long extinct Chaldeans of the south eastern extremities of Iraq. Many modern scholars also now believe Abraham's Ur was actually in Anatolia.

The term "Chaldeans" had a history of being used in an ethnically and geographically inaccurate sense by Rome, having been previously officially used by the Council of Florence on August 7, 1445, as a new name for a group of Greek Nestorians of Cyprus who entered into full communion with the Catholic Church. Rome followed to use the term Chaldeans to indicate the members of the Church of the East in Communion with Rome (mainly not to use the term Nestorian that was theologically unacceptable) also in 1681 for Joseph I and later in 1830 when Yohannan VIII Hormizd of the line of Alqosh became the first Patriarch of Babylon of the Chaldeans of the modern Chaldean Catholic Church.

"Pope Julian III in 1553 consecrated Sulâka, an Assyrian convert, "Patriarch of the Chaldeans" – the designation then given for the first time to the so-called Nestorians who had seceded to Rome, which patriarchate has been continued to this present day."

== Shemʿon line ==
Shimun VIII Yohannan Sulaqa was the first incumbent of the Shemʿon line of the Church of the East. This patriarchal See was initially located in Amid, but very soon moved to Siirt, then to Urmia, then to Khosrowa (near Salmas) and from the second half of 17th century to Qodchanis (now Konak, Hakkari).

The last patriarch of this line recognized by the pope was Shimun IX Dinkha (died 1600), and later, there were only a few correspondences through missionaries. This See reintroduced in 1600 the traditional heredity system for patriarchal' succession, a practice unacceptable to Rome. In 1692, patriarch Shimun XIII Dinkha broke formally the communion with Rome and returned his members to the faith that he abandoned, but without accepting the patriarchal line that he broke away from. The patriarchate that he originated is that which in 1976 adopted the name "Assyrian Church of the East".

== See also ==
- Schism of 1552
- List of Chaldean Catholic Patriarchs of Babylon

== Sources ==
- Assemani, Giuseppe Simone (1719). Bibliotheca orientalis clementino-vaticana. Vol. 1. Roma.
- Assemani, Giuseppe Simone (1725). Bibliotheca orientalis clementino-vaticana. Vol. 3. Roma.
- Assemani, Giuseppe Luigi (1775). De catholicis seu patriarchis Chaldaeorum et Nestorianorum commentarius historico-chronologicus. Roma.
- Assemani, Giuseppe Luigi (2004). History of the Chaldean and Nestorian patriarchs. Piscataway, New Jersey: Gorgias Press.
- Becchetti, Filippo Angelico (1796). Istoria degli ultimi quattro secoli della Chiesa. Vol. 10. Roma.
- Baum, Wilhelm; Winkler, Dietmar W. (2003). The Church of the East: A Concise History. London-New York: Routledge-Curzon. ISBN 9781134430192.
- Beltrami, Giuseppe (1933). La Chiesa Caldea nel secolo dell'Unione. Roma: Pontificium Institutum Orientalium Studiorum. ISBN 9788872102626.
- Frazee, Charles A. (2006) [1983]. Catholics and Sultans: The Church and the Ottoman Empire 1453-1923. Cambridge: Cambridge University Press. ISBN 9780521027007.
- Giamil, Samuel (1902). Genuinae relationes inter Sedem Apostolicam et Assyriorum orientalium seu Chaldaeorum ecclesiam. Roma: Ermanno Loescher.
- Gulik, Wilhelm van (1904). "Die Konsistorialakten über die Begründung des uniert-chaldäischen Patriarchates von Mosul unter Papst Julius III" (PDF). Oriens Christianus. 4: 261–277.
- Habbi, Joseph (1966). "Signification de l'union chaldéenne de Mar Sulaqa avec Rome en 1553". L'Orient Syrien. 11: 99–132, 199–230.
- Lampart, Albert (1966). Ein Märtyrer der Union mit Rom: Joseph I. 1681–1696, Patriarch der Chaldäer. Einsiedeln: Benziger Verlag.
- Marthaler, Berard L., ed. (2003). "Chaldean Catholic Church (Eastern Catholic)". The New Catholic Encyclopedia. Vol. 3. Thompson-Gale. pp. 366–369.
- Murre van den Berg, Heleen H. L. (1999). "The Patriarchs of the Church of the East from the Fifteenth to Eighteenth Centuries". Hugoye: Journal of Syriac Studies. 2 (2): 235–264. doi:10.31826/hug-2010-020119. S2CID 212688640.
- Nichols, Aidan (2010) [1992]. Rome and the Eastern Churches: A Study in Schism (2nd revised ed.). San Francisco: Ignatius Press. ISBN 9781586172824.
- O’Mahony, Anthony (2006). "Syriac Christianity in the modern Middle East". In Angold, Michael (ed.). The Cambridge History of Christianity: Eastern Christianity. Vol. 5. Cambridge: Cambridge University Press. pp. 511–536. ISBN 9780521811132.
- Tfinkdji, Joseph (1914). "L' église chaldéenne catholique autrefois et aujourd'hui". Annuaire Pontifical Catholique. 17: 449–525.
- Tisserant, Eugène (1931). "Église nestorienne". Dictionnaire de théologie catholique. Vol. 11. pp. 157–323.
- Vosté, Jacques Marie (1925). "Missio duorum fratrum Melitensium O. P. in Orientem saec. XVI et relatio, nunc primum edita, eorum quae in istis regionibus gesserunt". Analecta Ordinis Praedicatorum. 33 (4): 261–278.
- Vosté, Jacques Marie (1931). "Mar Iohannan Soulaqa, premier Patriarche des Chaldéens, martyr de l'union avec Rome (†1555)". Angelicum. 8: 187–234.
- Wilmshurst, David (2000). The Ecclesiastical Organisation of the Church of the East, 1318–1913. Louvain: Peeters Publishers. ISBN 9789042908765.
- Wilmshurst, David (2011). The martyred Church: A History of the Church of the East. London: East & West Publishing Limited. ISBN 9781907318047.

Chaldean Catholic Church titles
Preceded by New Creation	Patriarch of Mosul in Eastern Syria; Patriarch of the Church of the Chaldeans of Mosul; Patriarch of the Eastern Assyrians; Shemʿon line (Amid) (1553–1555)	Succeeded by Abdisho IV Maron
