= Syriac Bible of Paris =

Illuminated Bible

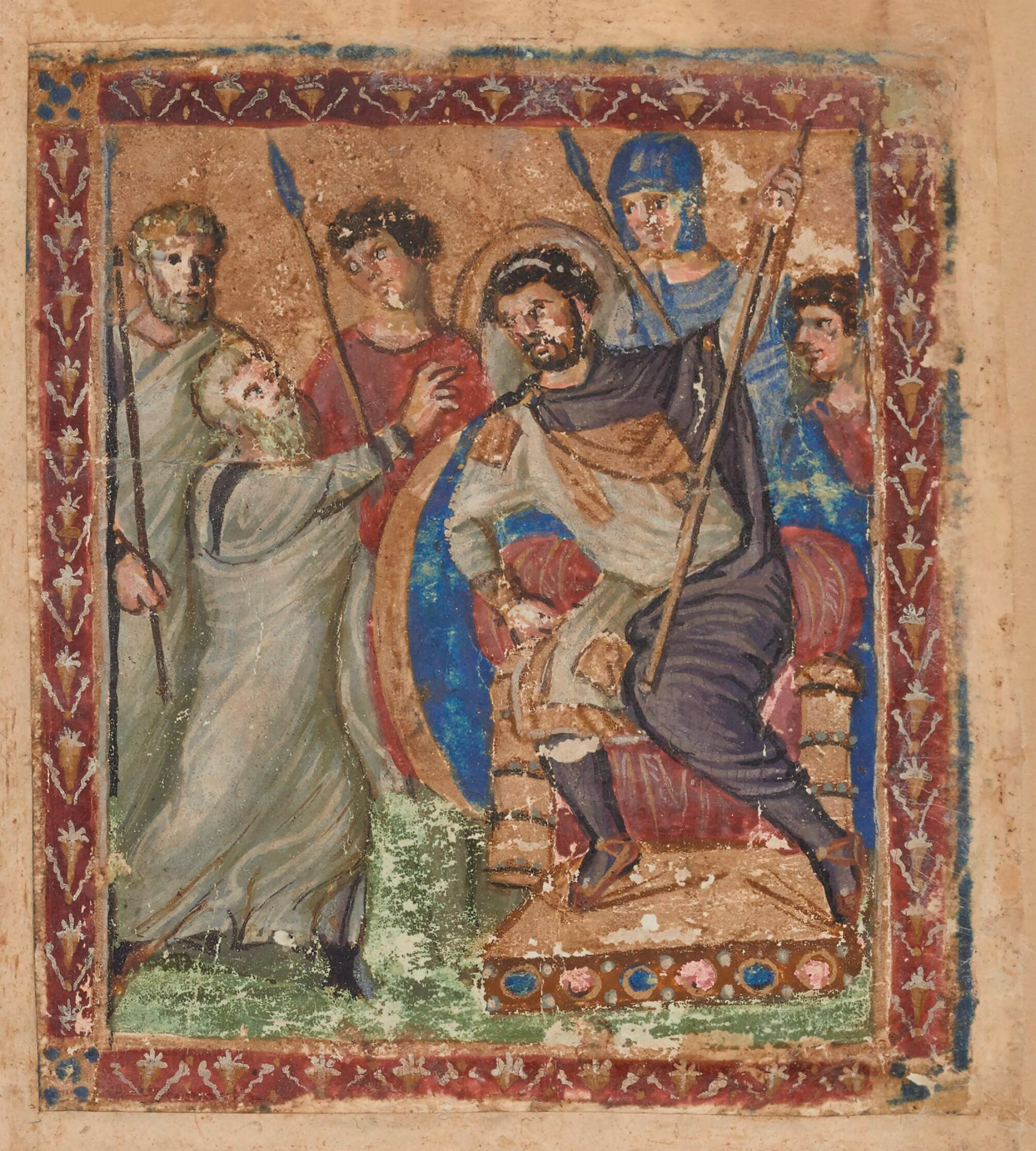
Paris, Bibliothèque Nationale, Syriaque 341, fol. 8r. Moses before Pharaoh

The Syriac Bible of Paris (Paris, Bibliothèque Nationale, MS syr. 341) is an illuminated Bible written in Syriac. It dates to 6th or 7th century. It is believed to have been made in northern Mesopotamia. The manuscript has 246 extant folios. Large sections of text and the accompanying illustrations are missing. The folios are 312 by 230 mm. For reasons of economy, the text is written in three columns.

The illumination consists of miniatures introducing each of the books of the Bible and set into one or two of the text columns. The miniature for the Book of Genesis which may have been the most sumptuous miniature is missing. Although most of the miniatures are full length author portraits, some depict scenes from the following book. For example, the miniature before the Book of Job depicts Job on the dung heap. This miniature combine several scenes from the Book of Job. Job is pictured lying naked on the dung heap, covered with sores. Below him his wife is talking to him. To the left are his three friends. One of them is seen rending his garments, while the other two are seated, and talking to him. The Book of Exodus also has a narrative miniature before it. It depicts Moses and Aaron requesting permission to depart from Pharaoh. It is hard to understand why this scene, rather than one of the many more popular scenes was chosen to be the sole illustration for Exodus. Other miniatures are allegorical groups. The miniature before the Book of Proverbs shows the Virgin and Child, flanked by Solomon, representing the wisdom of the Old Testament, and Ecclesia, a personification of the Christian Church. Only one New Testament miniature survives, that of James the Apostle. The miniatures show mixture of Hellenistic heritage and a native Syriac tradition. Some of the miniatures, especially the miniature before Exodus, show stylistic similarities to the miniatures in the Rabbula Gospels. Based on this it is unlikely that this manuscript was made much later than were the Rabula Gospels of 586.

The manuscript is assumed to have come from the episcopal library of Siirt near Lake Van, where it may have been produced. It has been in the Bibliothèque Nationale since 1909.

== See also ==
- Nestorian Evangelion
- Book of Job in Byzantine Illuminated Manuscripts
