= Eliya VI =

Mar Eliya VI
- Patriarch of the Church of the East
- Church: Church of the East
- Installed: 1558
- Term ended: 1591
- Predecessor: Shemon VII Ishoyahb
- Successor: Eliya VII

Personal details
- Died: May 26, 1591
- Residence: Rabban Hormizd Monastery

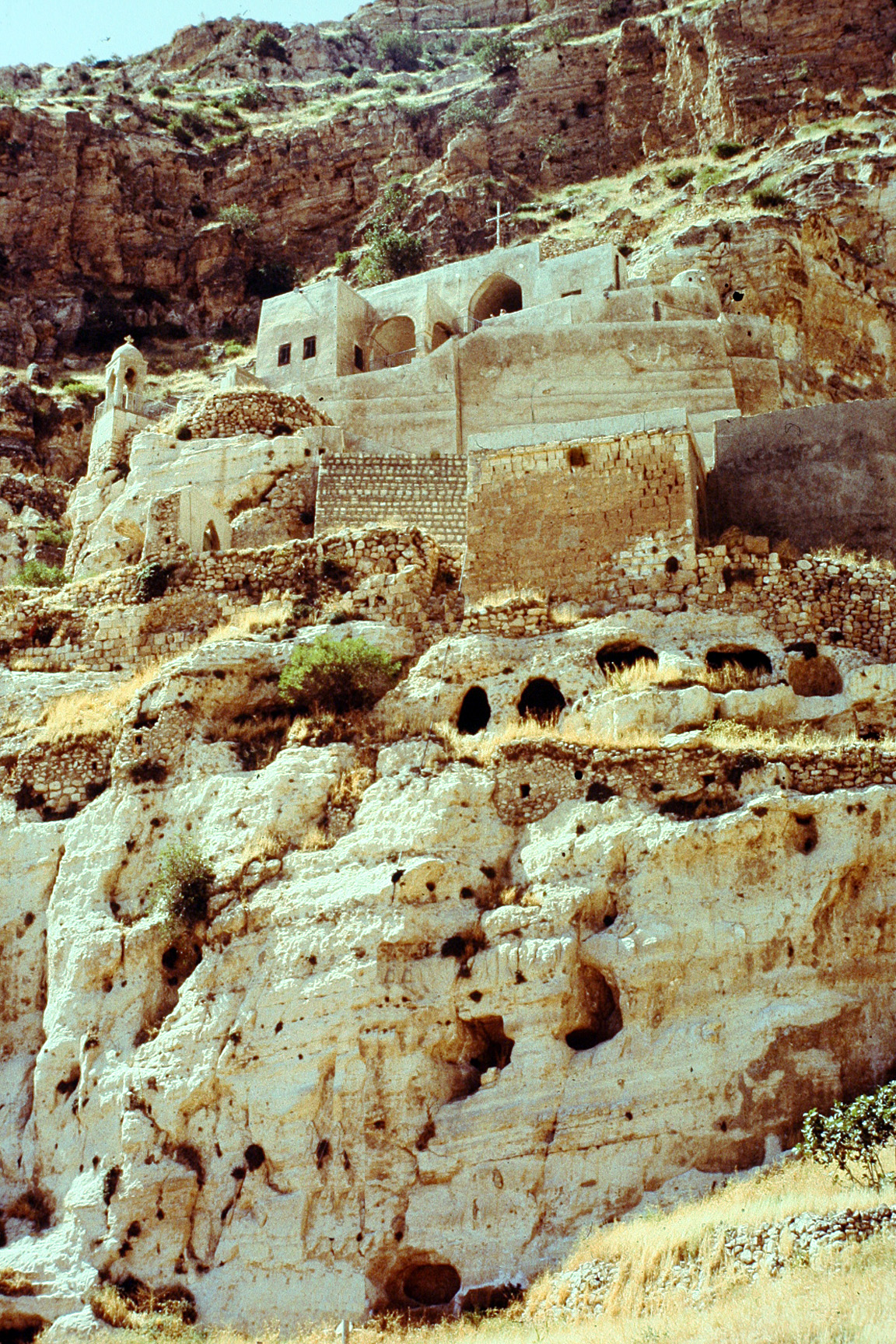
The ancient Rabban Hormizd Monastery, former residence of the Patriarchs of the Church of the East

Eliya VI (Syriac: ܐܠܝܐ / Elīyā, d. 26 May 1591) was Patriarch of the Church of the East from 1558 to 1591, with residence in Rabban Hormizd Monastery, near Alqosh, in modern Iraq. In older historiography, he was designated as Eliya VI, but later renumbered as Eliya "VII" by some authors, who believed that during the period from 1558 to 1591 there were two successive Eliya patriarchs (first in 1558-1576, and second in 1576-1591). After the resolution of several chronological questions, he was designated again as Eliya VI, and that numeration is accepted in recent scholarly works.

== Biography ==
Eliya was younger nephew of patriarch Shemon VII Ishoyahb (1539-1558), who originally designated Eliya's older brother Hnanishoʿ as his successor. Several years later, probably because Hnanishoʿ had died in the interim, patriarch Shemon VII transferred the succession to his other nephew, fifteen-year-old Eliya. Thus he became natar kursya (designated successor) of the Patriarchal Throne. In 1545, Eliya was made Metropolitan. His uncle, patriarch Shemon VII, died on 1 November 1558, and was succeeded by Eliya who became new Patriarch of All the East. During his patriarchal tenure, from 1558 to 1591, Church of the East preserved its traditional christology and ecclesiastical independence. He died on May 26, 1591, and was buried in the Rabban Hormizd Monastery.

== See also ==
- Patriarch of the Church of the East
- List of patriarchs of the Church of the East
- Assyrian Church of the East

== Notes ==
Church of the East titles
Preceded by Shemon VII Ishoyahb (1538–1558)	Catholicos-Patriarch of the Church of the East; Eliya line (Alqosh) (1558–1581)	Succeeded by Eliya VII (1591–1617)
