= Eliya V =

Mar Eliya V
- Patriarch of the Church of the East
- Church: Church of the East
- See: Seleucia-Ctesiphon
- Installed: September 1502/3
- Term ended: 1503/4
- Predecessor: Shemon V
- Successor: Shemon VI

Personal details
- Born: 15th century
- Died: 1503/4
- Buried: Mart Meskinta, Mosul

Ordination history of Eliya V
Episcopal succession
Bishops consecrated by Eliya V as principal consecrator
- Mar Yahballaha: 1503
- Mar Denha: 1503
- Mar Yaqob: 1503

Mar Elīyā V (sometimes written Elia V) was the patriarch of the Church of the East from September 1502 until his death in 1504.

In April 1503 or 1504, in the monastery of Mar Yohannan the Egyptian near Gazarta, Eliya consecrated three monks from the monastery of Mar Awgin for service in India: the metropolitan bishop Yahballaha and two suffragan bishops, Denha and Yaʿqob. The patriarch sent with them Mar Thomas, who had previously gone to India in 1499. The bishops sent a detailed letter on the situation of the Church of the East in India, but it did not reach Eliya before his death.

Eliya was buried in the church of Mart Meskinta in Mosul.

Wilmhurst argues that, based on the brevity of Eliya's reign and the fact that he was not buried in Rabban Hormizd Monastery (as was the custom for Patriarchs at the time), the legitimacy of his patriarchy may not have been universally recognised by his contemporaries.

== Bibliography ==
- Baum, Wilhelm; Winkler, Dietmar W. (2003). The Church of the East: A Concise History. London-New York: Routledge-Curzon.
- Burleson, Samuel; Van Rompay, Lucas (2011). "List of Patriarchs of the Main Syriac Churches in the Middle East". Gorgias Encyclopedic Dictionary of the Syriac Heritage. Piscataway, NJ: Gorgias Press. pp. 481–491.
- Murre van den Berg, Heleen H. L. (1999). "The Patriarchs of the Church of the East from the Fifteenth to Eighteenth Centuries" (PDF). Hugoye: Journal of Syriac Studies. 2 (2): 235–264.
- Neill, Stephen (2004) [1984]. A History of Christianity in India: The Beginnings to AD 1707. Cambridge: Cambridge University Press. ISBN 9780521548854.
- Wilmshurst, David (2000). The Ecclesiastical Organisation of the Church of the East, 1318–1913. Louvain: Peeters Publishers.
- Wilmshurst, David (2011). The Martyred Church: A History of the Church of the East. London: East & West Publishing Limited.
- Wilmshurst, David (2019). "The patriarchs of the Church of the East". The Syriac World. London: Routledge. pp. 799–805.

Church of the East titles
Preceded by Shemon V (1497–1502)	Catholicos-Patriarch of the East (1502–1504)	Succeeded by Shemon VI (1504–1538)
