= Shemon V =

Mar Shemʿon V
- Patriarch of the Church of the East
- Church: Church of the East
- See: Seleucia-Ctesiphon
- Installed: 1497
- Term ended: September 1502
- Predecessor: Shemon IV
- Successor: Eliya V

Personal details
- Born: 15th century
- Died: September 1502
- Buried: Monastery of Mar Awgin

Ordination history of Shemon V
Episcopal succession
Bishops consecrated by Shemon V as principal consecrator
- Mar Thoma: c. 1499
- Mar Yohannon: c. 1499

Mar Shemʿon V (died September 1502) was the patriarch of the Church of the East from 1497 until his death. His short reign is poorly documented and it is possible that he was in fact an anti-patriarch.

Probably in 1499, Shemʿon V received a pair of messengers from the Indian church requesting bishops. The patriarch consecrated Thomas and John, two monks of the monastery of Mar Awgin, as bishops and dispatched them to India with letters of authentication. Thomas returned not long after with gifts from the Indian Christians, while John remained there as bishop.

Shemʿon's death is recorded in a letter from the Indian Christians. He was buried in the monastery of Mar Awgin. It may be significant that he was not buried in the monastery of Rabban Hormizd, where his predecessor, Shemʿon IV, and nearly all his successors were buried. His election may have represented a reaction to the policies of Shemʿon IV favouring his own family.

== Bibliography ==
- Burleson, Samuel; Van Rompay, Lucas (2011). "List of Patriarchs: I. The Church of the East and its Uniate Continuations". In Sebastian P. Brock; Aaron M. Butts; George A. Kiraz; Lucas Van Rompay (eds.). Gorgias Encyclopedic Dictionary of the Syriac Heritage. Gorgias Press.
- Carlson, Thomas A. (2018). Christianity in Fifteenth-Century Iraq. Cambridge University Press.
- Carlson, Thomas A. (2019). "Syriac in a Diverse Middle East: From the Mongol Ilkhanate to Ottoman Dominance, 1286–1517". In Daniel King (ed.). The Syriac World. Routledge. pp. 718–730.
- Wilmshurst, David J. (2000). The Ecclesiastical Organisation of the Church of the East, 1318–1913. Peeters.
- Wilmshurst, David J. (2011). The Martyred Church: A History of the Church of the East. East and West Publishing.
- Wilmshurst, David J. (2019). "The Patriarchs of the Church of the East". In Daniel King (ed.). The Syriac World. Routledge. pp. 799–805.

Church of the East titles
Preceded by Shemon IV (c.1450–1497)	Catholicos-Patriarch of the East (1497–1502)	Succeeded by Eliya V (1502–1504)
