= Abdisho IV Maron =

Head of the Chaldean Catholic Church from 1555 to 1570

Mar Abdisho IV Maron
- Patriarch of the Chaldeans; Patriarch of the Eastern Assyrians
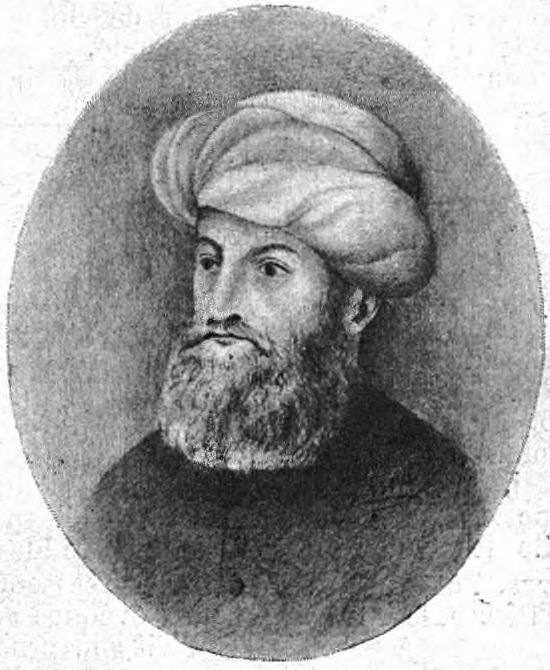
- Church: Chaldean Catholic Church
- See: Amid of the Chaldeans; Siirt of the Chaldeans
- Installed: 1555
- Term ended: 11 September 1570
- Predecessor: Shimun VIII Yohannan Sulaqa
- Successor: Yahballaha IV

Personal details
- Born: Abdisho Maron of Yohannan
- Died: 11 September 1570
- Residence: Siirt, Ottoman Empire

Mar Abdisho IV Maron (Classical Syriac: ܥܒܕܝܫܘܥ ܪܒܝܥܝܐ ܡܪܘܢ) was the second Patriarch of the Chaldean Catholic Church, from 1555 to 1570.

Abdisho, whose name is spelled in many different ways in Latin characters (Abdisu, Abd-Jesu, Hebed-Jesu, Abdissi, Audishu) meaning Servant of Jesus, was born in Gazarta on the River Tigris, son of Yohannan of the house of Mari. He entered in the monasteries of Saint Antony and of Mar Ahha and Yohannan, and in 1554 was consecrated metropolitan bishop of Gazarta by Shimun VIII Yohannan Sulaqa.

After Sulaqa's death in 1555, Abdisho was elected patriarch of the Chaldean Church. He could travel to Rome only in 1561. On 7 March 1562 Abdisho made a profession of faith in front of pope Pius IV and on 17 April 1562 he received from the pope the pallium, the sign of the confirmation of his election declaring him as "Patriarch of the Eastern Assyrians".

In a letter of his dated 1562 to the pope he listed thirty-eight dioceses under his rule, ranging from the Ottoman Empire to Persia and India. Modern scholars suggest that the actual dioceses could be only about fourteen, and the error in the list was due to a probable mistake in translation from Syriac to Latin.

He preferred to return to his church without waiting for attending the next session of the Council of Trent, where, on 17 Sept 1562 (XXII session), was given a detailed account of what he narrated about his Church and his faith. The Portuguese bishops objected when it was narrated that Abdisho considered the jurisdiction of the Church of the East wide-ranging up to South India.

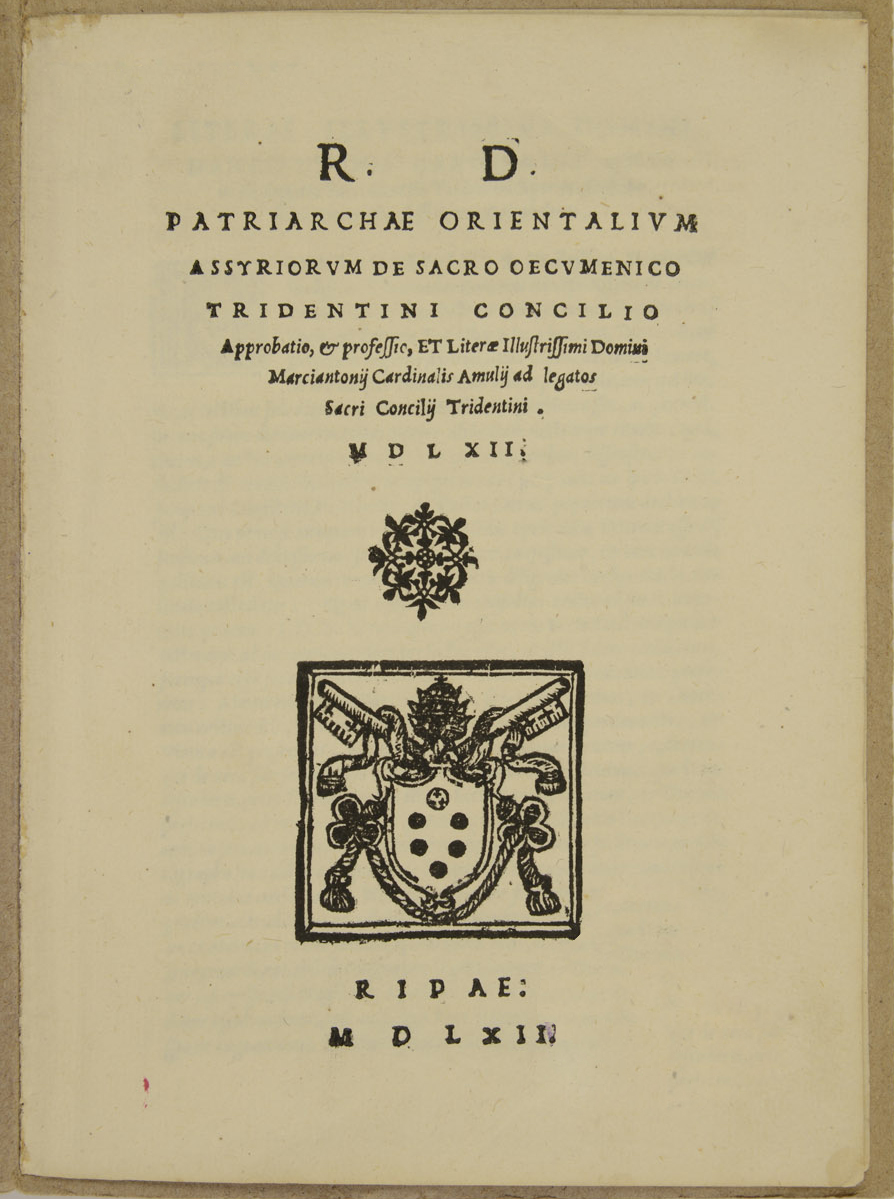
Credentials of Abdisho IV Maron to the Council of Trent in 1562

About his reign, we know that in 1565 the pope confirmed the use of the traditional Chaldean uses and rites, and that he moved the See from Amid to the monastery of Mar Yaqub Khbhisha near Siirt. Among the different possible dates of Abdisho's death, Murre suggests 11 September 1570.

== Works ==
Abdisho left a poem in which he narrated the events of Yohannan Sulaqa's life. He should not be confused with Abdisho bar Berika who lived in the 13th–14th century and was a prolific writer.

== Mentions in literature and art ==
Abdisho is a character in Hans Pfitzner's opera Palestrina, in which he is one of the prelates attending the Council of Trent.

== See also ==
- List of Chaldean Catholic Patriarchs

== Sources ==
- Wilmshurst, David (2000). The Ecclesiastical Organisation of the Church of the East, 1318–1913. Louvain: Peeters Publishers. ISBN 9789042908765.

Chaldean Catholic Church titles
Preceded by Shimun VIII Yohannan Sulaqa	Patriarch of the Chaldeans; Patriarch of the Eastern Assyrians; Shemʿon line (Siirt) (1555–1570)	Succeeded by Yahballaha IV
