= Monastery of Mar Awgin =

Monastery in Nusaybin, Mardin, Turkey

Monastery of Mor Augin
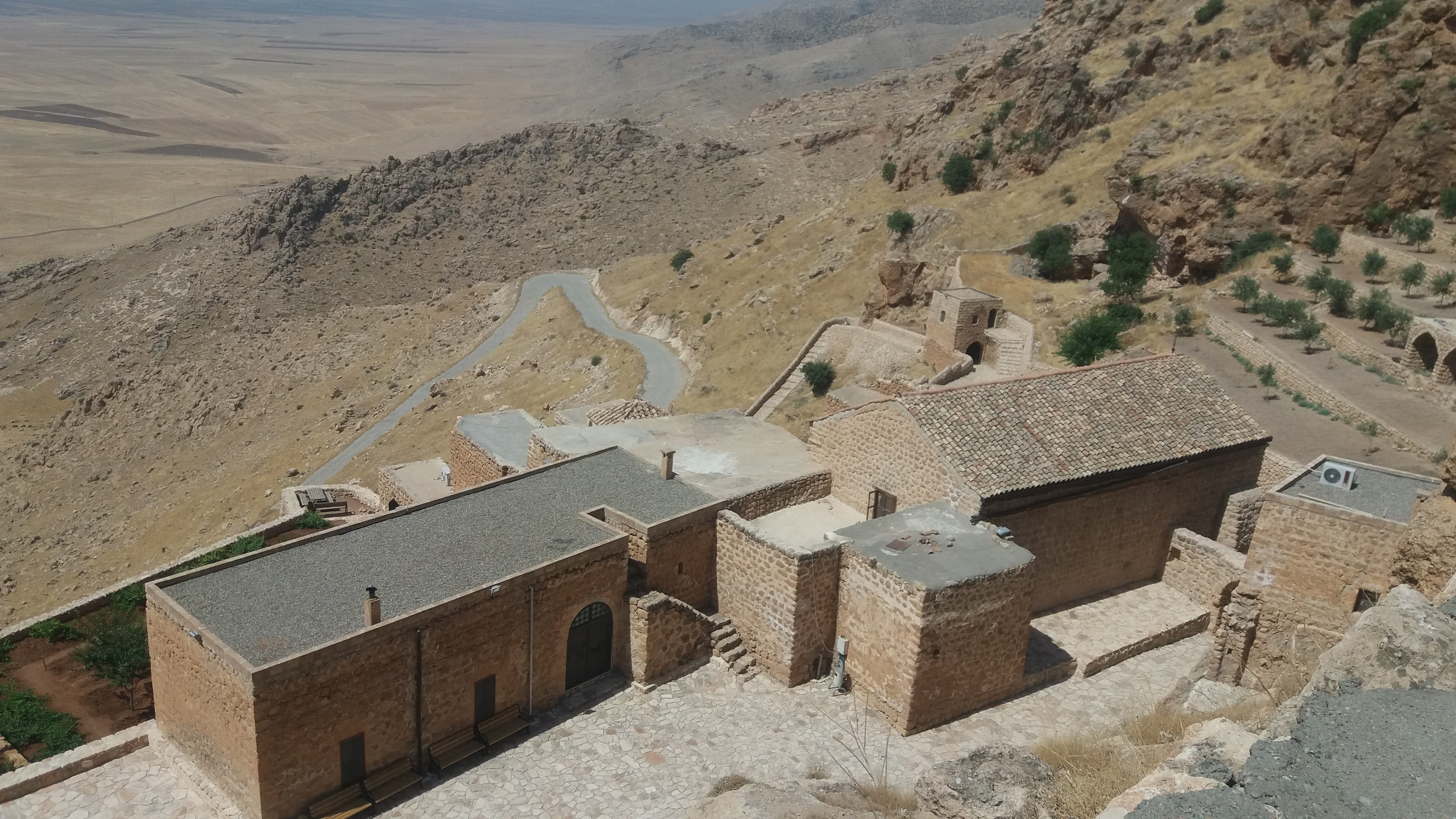
- The Monastery of Mor Augin from the northern point of view

- Location within Turkey

Monastery information
- Order: Syriac Orthodox Church, Assyrian Church of the East (until the 17th century)
- Dedication: Saint Awgin

Site
- Location: Near Nusaybin, Turkey
- Coordinates: 37.167739°N 41.408318°E

Monastery of Mor Augin (Syriac: ܕܝܪܐ ܕܡܪܝ ܐܘܓܝܢ, romanized: The Monastery of St. Augin, Arabic: دير مار أوجين) is a Christian monastery located in southeastern Turkey and is 40 kilometers from Nusaybin.

== History ==
The monastery was founded in the first half of the fourth century AD by Saint Awgin, a monk from El Kulzom, Egypt. Mor Augin came with seventy of his disciples to preach Christianity in Mardin Province which was controlled by the Sasanian Empire.

The monastery originally belonged to the Assyrian Church of the East until the 17th century. The last monks belonging to the Church of the East left the monastery between 1838-1842. Near the monastery are the ruins of the former Church of the East monasteries of Mar Yuhanon, Mar Abraham the Elder, and Mar Malke.

In 1915, during the Sayfo, the monks witnessed the destruction of Syriac villages in the plains below. The monastery was also affected by violence.

== Veneration ==
Mor Sabor and Mor Afroth, according to Syrian Christians of Kerala, were two bishops from the Monastery of Mar Awgin (often described in local memory as “Syrian bishops”) who are believed to have traveled to Malabar coast in 825 AD along with a group of Christian settlers. Together, they established ecclesiastical institutions in several regions. Revered for their devoutness, they were posthumously recognized as saints by the local ecclesiastical body. The mission is said to have received permission from the then king of Kerala to build a church in Kollam.
