= Shemon IV =

Mar Shemʿon IV Basidi
- Patriarch of the Church of the East
- Church: Church of the East
- See: Seleucia-Ctesiphon
- Installed: c.1450
- Term ended: 20 February 1497
- Predecessor: Shemon III
- Successor: Shemon V

Personal details
- Born: 15th century
- Died: 20 February 1497
- Buried: Rabban Hormizd Monastery
- Residence: Rabban Hormizd Monastery

Mar Shemʿon IV Basidi (died 20 February 1497) was the patriarch of the Church of the East in the last quarter of the 15th century. Traditionally his reign is said to have begun in 1437, but this results in an improbably long tenure and has been revised by modern research. Thomas Carlson puts the start of his reign in 1477, while David Wilmshurst places it about 1450.

Shemʿon's Arabic surname, Basidi, indicates that he or his family came from the village of Beth Sayyade in the vicinity of Erbil. According to a document from 1552: "A hundred years ago we had a patriarch who would only consecrate a metropolitan from among his own stock, clan and family, and his family has maintained that custom during the past century." Shemʿon IV has thus been see as the patriarch responsible for making the office hereditary. This he did by only appointing metropolitans from his family and designating his successor as natar kursya (guardian of the throne).

A different picture from that of the document of 1552, which was drawn up by enemies of the patriarchal family, is painted by a note in a manuscript copied at Mosul in 1484 by the archdeacon Ishoʿ, who was attached to the patriarchate. According to him, "the Church was at peace, the convents and brothers enjoyed freedom, the ruined monasteries were restored, the degrees of priests and levites multiplied, and the faithful were blessed by the intercession of" the Aq Qoyunlu ruler Yaqub Beg. Another manuscript note from 1488, specifically states that Shemʿon IV successfully intervened with Yaqub to have churches reopened in the eastern districts. Apparently, one of Yaqub's subordinates had begun enforcing the restrictive laws against Christians strictly sometime before 1484, leading the destruction and closure of many churches.

Shemʿon died on 20 February 1497 and was buried in the monastery of Rabban Hormizd near Alqosh, where he may have spent most of his patriarchate. An epitaph records his burial.

== Bibliography ==
- Burleson, Samuel; Van Rompay, Lucas (2011). "List of Patriarchs: I. The Church of the East and its Uniate Continuations". In Sebastian P. Brock; Aaron M. Butts; George A. Kiraz; Lucas Van Rompay (eds.). Gorgias Encyclopedic Dictionary of the Syriac Heritage. Gorgias Press.
- Carlson, Thomas A. (2018). Christianity in Fifteenth-Century Iraq. Cambridge University Press.
- Carlson, Thomas A. (2019). "Syriac in a Diverse Middle East: From the Mongol Ilkhanate to Ottoman Dominance, 1286–1517". In Daniel King (ed.). The Syriac World. Routledge. pp. 718–730.
- Wilmshurst, David J. (2000). The Ecclesiastical Organisation of the Church of the East, 1318–1913. Peeters.
- Wilmshurst, David J. (2011). The Martyred Church: A History of the Church of the East. East and West Publishing.
- Wilmshurst, David J. (2019). "The Patriarchs of the Church of the East". In Daniel King (ed.). The Syriac World. Routledge. pp. 799–805.

Church of the East titles
| Preceded by Shemon III (c.1425–c.1450) | Catholicos-Patriarch of the East (c.1450–1497) | Succeeded by Shemon V (1497–1502) |
