= Natar kursya =

Officer of the Church of the East

The nāṭar kursyā (or nāṭar kursi, Syriac ܢܛܪ ܟܘܪܣܝܐ, meaning "guardian of the throne") was an officer of the Church of the East. Originally charged with administering the church in the interim between the death of one patriarch and the election of a new one, the office had evolved by the end of the 15th century so that its holder was the designated successor of the reigning patriarch. At first, the bishop of Kashkar was ex officio guardian of the throne, but by the 14th century the honour had been transferred to the metropolitan of Elam. It was under Patriarch Shemʿon IV (died 1497) that the office was transformed. Endeavouring to keep the patriarchal office in his family and in violation of canon law, he appointed his nephew to the office and designated him his chosen successor. This practice became traditional, except when the church or a part of it was in union with Rome. Sometimes the nāṭar kursyā was a nephew, at other times a younger brother. The patriarch could change the appointment if the nāṭar kursyā fell out of favour. He was always a bishop. By the end of the 16th century, he was usually appointed metropolitan of Mosul. Higher clergy in the Church of the East did not eat animal products other than eggs and dairy, and in the Qūdshānīs patriarchate this restriction was extended to the patriarch's sister during pregnancy, since she might have been carrying a future nāṭar kursyā.

The system of the nāṭar kursyā was later extended to other dioceses.
