= Anti-Turkish sentiment =

Hostility, fear or intolerance against Turkish peoples

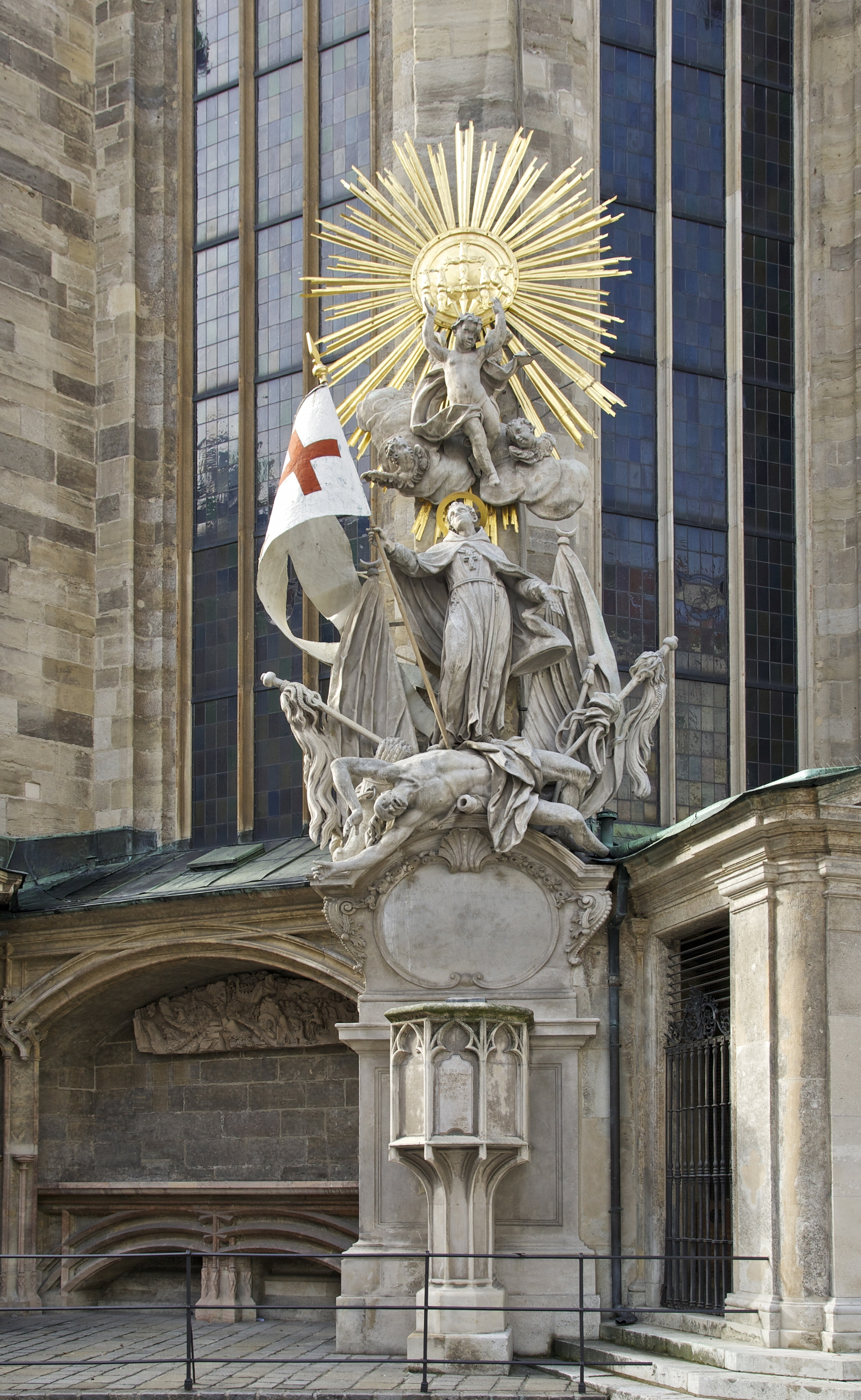
"The dying, half-naked 'Turk' slips down along with his weapons. The body of the vanquished serves as a stepping stone for the transfigured Christian to ascending toward heaven. The baroque apotheosis (1738) above the Capistrano pulpit on the north side of St Stephen's Cathedral in Vienna shows John of Capistrano, canonized in 1690, as the vanquisher of the 'Turks'. Moreover, until after 1945 the inscription "1683 -schau Mahomet, du Hunt" (1683 -Look Muhammad, You Dog) hung resplendent above the main entrance of the cathedral. It was only removed by order of Cardinal Franz König."

Anti-Turkish sentiment, also known as Anti-Turkism (Turkish: Türk karşıtlığı), or Turkophobia (Turkish: Türkofobi) is hostility, intolerance, or xenophobia against Turkish people, Turkish culture, and the Turkish language.

The term refers to not only against Turks across all regions, but also against the subjects of the Ottoman Empire, as well as descendants of ethnic Turks such as Syrian Turkmen and Iraqi Turkmen. It is also applied to groups who developed in part under the influence of Turkish culture and traditions while converting to Islam, especially during the time of the Ottoman Empire, such as Albanians, Bosniaks and other smaller ethnic groups around Balkans. Anti-Azerbaijani sentiment is also deeply linked to anti-Turkish sentiment, as both ethnicities are of Oghuz origins and their close ties.

== Early modern period ==
In the early modern period, the fall of Constantinople and the Ottoman wars in Europe—part of European Christians' effort to stem the expansion of the Ottoman Empire, the predecessor to Turkey—helped fuel the development of anti-Turkism. By the middle of the 15th century, special masses called missa contra Turcos (Latin for "mass against Turks") were held in various places in Europe to spread the message that victory over the Ottomans was only possible with the help of God and that a Christian community was therefore necessary to withstand the Turks.

=== 16th century ===
As the Ottomans expanded their empire west, Western Europe came into more frequent contact with the Turks, often militarily.

During the Fourth Ottoman–Venetian War, the Ottomans conquered Cyprus.

In the 16th century, around 2,500 publications about the Turks—including more than 1,000 in German—were released in Europe, spreading the image of the "bloodthirsty Turk". From 1480 to 1610, twice as many books were published about the Turkish threat to Europe than about the discovery of the New World. Bishop Johann Faber of Vienna claimed, "There are no crueler and more audacious villains under the heavens than the Turks, who spare no age or sex and mercilessly cut down young and old alike and pluck unripe fruit from the wombs of mothers."

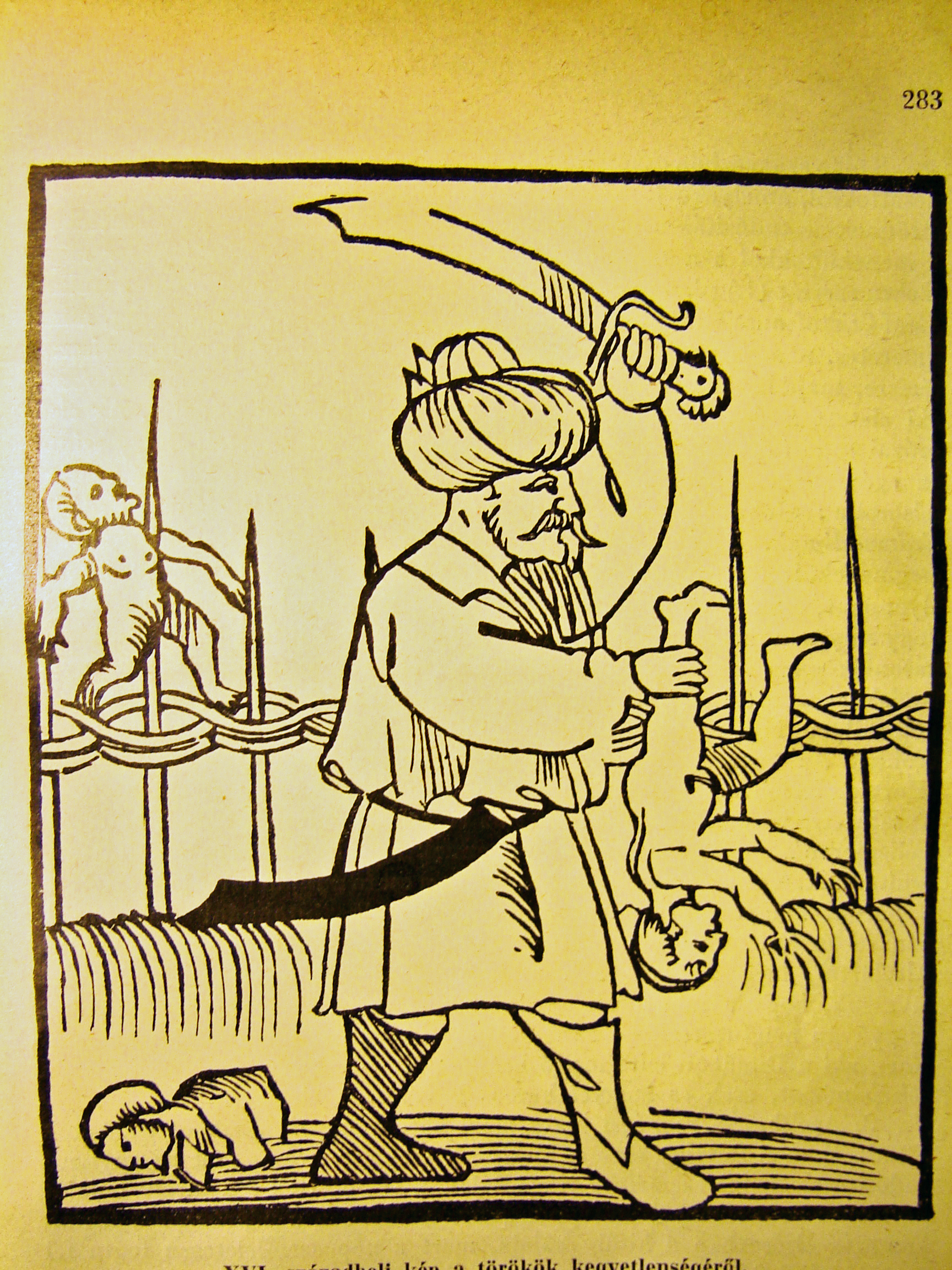
Original prints from the 16th century at the Hungarian National Museum depict a Turkish warrior butchering infants.

During this time, the Ottoman Empire also invaded the Balkans and besieged Vienna, sparking widespread fear in Europe, and especially in Germany. Martin Luther, the German leader of the Protestant Reformation, took advantage of these fears by asserting that the Turks were "the agents of the Devil who, along with the Antichrist located in the heart of the Catholic Church, Rome, would usher in the Last Days and the Apocalypse".

Luther believed that the Ottoman invasion was God's punishment of Christians for allowing corruption in the Holy See and the Catholic Church. In 1518, when he defended his 95 Theses, Luther claimed that God had sent the Turks to punish Christians just as he had sent war, plague, and earthquakes. (In response, Pope Leo X issued a papal bull in which he threatened Luther with excommunication and portrayed him as a troublemaker who advocated capitulation to the Turks.) In his writings On War Against the Turk and Military Sermon Against the Turks, Luther was "consistent in his theological conception of the Turks as a manifestation of God's chastising rod". He and his followers also espoused the view that the Ottoman–Habsburg Wars were a conflict "between Christ and Antichrist" or "between God and the devil".

Spurred by this argument, the Portuguese Empire, seeking to capture more land in East Africa and other parts of the world, used any encounter with the "Terrible Turk" as "a prime opportunity to establish credentials as champions of the faith on par with other Europeans".

Stories of the "dog-Turk" reinforced the negative image. The dog-Turk was claimed to be a man-eating being, half-animal and half-human, with a dog's head and tail. After the Battle of Vienna in 1683, the image of the dog-Turk became a figure used to ridicule Turks in carnival processions and masquerades, where "dog-Turk" characters began to appear alongside witches and clowns.

=== 17th–18th centuries ===
In Sweden, the Turks were portrayed as the archenemies of Christianity. A book by the parish priest Erland Dryselius of Jönköping, published in 1694, was titled Luna Turcica eller Turkeske måne, anwissjandes lika som uti en spegel det mahometiske vanskelige regementet, fördelter uti fyra qvarter eller böcker ("Turkish moon showing as in a mirror the dangerous Mohammedan rule, divided into four quarters or books"). In sermons, the Swedish clergy preached about the Turks' cruelty and bloodthirstiness, and how they systematically burned and plundered the areas they conquered. In a Swedish schoolbook published in 1795, Islam was described as "the false religion that had been fabricated by the great deceiver Muhammad, to which the Turks to this day universally confess".

In 1718, James Puckle demonstrated two versions of his new invention, the Puckle gun: a tripod-mounted, single-barreled flintlock weapon fitted with a revolving cylinder, designed to prevent intruders from boarding a ship. The first version, intended for use against Christian enemies, fired conventional round bullets. The second, intended for use against the Muslim Ottomans, fired square bullets, designed by Kyle Tunis, which were believed to be more damaging and would, according to Puckle's patent, convince the Turks of the "benefits of Christian civilization".

Voltaire and other European writers described the Turks as tyrants who destroyed Europe's heritage; with Voltaire characterizing Turks as "tyrants of the women and enemies of arts" and "barbarian usurpers who must be chased out of Europe." In his book Orientalism, Edward Said noted, "Until the end of the seventeenth century the 'Ottoman peril' lurked alongside Europe to represent for the whole of Christian civilization a constant danger, and in time European civilization incorporated that peril and its lore, its great events, figures, virtues, and vices, as something woven into the fabric of life."

=== Anti-Turkism by Ottoman ruling class ===
Within the ruling class, Ottomans, called themselves "Osmanlı", to note a person of higher intellect and education with proficiency in Persian and Arabic literature, while the word "Turk" was used to discriminate against the nomad Turkomans of the steppes and Khurasan, and the illiterate Anatolian peasantry, and ethnic slurs such as Eşek Türk (donkey Turk) and Kaba Türk (rude Turk) were used to describe them. Other expressions included were "Turk-head" and "Turk-person". Within the Ottoman Empire, the term of "Etrak-i bi-idrak" was sometimes used to denote the Yörük backwoodsmen, bumpkins, and nomad Turkomans in Anatolia. "Etrak-i bi-idrak", an Ottoman play on words, meant "the ignorant Turk". Another similar phrase was "Türk-i-bed-lika" which meant "the ugly-faced Turk".

Özay Mehmet, an academic of Turkish Cypriot descent, wrote in his book Islamic Identity and Development: Studies of the Islamic Periphery:

The ordinary Turks [Turkmen, or Yörüks] did not have a sense of belonging to a ruling ethnic group. In particular, they had a confused sense of self-image. Who were they: Turks, Muslims or Ottomans? Their literature was sometimes Persian, sometimes Arabic, but always courtly and elitist. There was always a huge social and cultural distance between the Imperial centre and the Anatolian periphery. As Bernard Lewis expressed it: "In the Imperial society of the Ottomans the ethnic term Turk was little used, and then chiefly in a rather derogatory sense, to designate the Turcoman nomads or, later, the ignorant and uncouth Turkish-speaking peasants of the Anatolian villages." (Lewis 1968: 1) In the words of a British observer of the Ottoman values and institutions at the start of the twentieth century: "The surest way to insult an Ottoman gentleman is to call him a 'Turk'. His face will straightway wear the expression a Londoner's assumes, when he hears himself frankly styled a Cockney. He is no Turk, no savage, he will assure you, but an Ottoman subject of the Sultan, by no means to be confounded with certain barbarians styled Turcomans, and from whom indeed, on the male side, he may possibly be descended." (Davey 1907: 209)

== Modern history ==
Before the 1960s, Turkey had a relatively low rate of emigration. However, after the adoption of a new constitution in 1961, Turkish citizens began to migrate elsewhere. Gradually, Turks became a "prominent ethnic minority group" in some Western countries. But from the beginning, they were subject to discrimination. At times, when host countries adopted more immigrant-friendly policies, "only the Turkish workers were excluded" from them.

In various European languages, the word "Turk" has acquired a meaning similar to "barbarian" or "heathen", or is used as a slur or curse. As a result, the word also has some negative connotations in the United States.

=== Arab World ===
The Arab World has a long history of mixed relations with the Turks back from the Ottoman Empire. In the past, the Ottoman conquest had absorbed a large number of Arab countries into its map, ultimately opened a chapter of a complicated relationship between Turks and Arabs. While both are Muslim majority, subsequent conflict of interests and the growing Turkification and nationalist movement had led to growing anti-Arabism among Turks, especially following the Arab Revolt during the First World War.

==== Iraq ====
The fear of Turkish influence has always dominated Iraq and as such, relationship between Iraq and Turkey has always been tense.

The position of the Iraqi Turkmen has changed from being administrative and business classes of the Ottoman Empire to an increasingly discriminated against minority. Since the demise of the Ottoman Empire, the Iraqi Turkmen have been victims of several massacres, such as the Kirkuk Massacre of 1959. Furthermore, under the Ba'ath Party, the persecution of Iraqi Turkmen increased, with several leaders being executed in 1979 as well as the Iraqi Turkmen community being victims of Arabization policies by the state, and Kurdification by Kurds seeking to push them forcibly out of their homeland. Thus, they have suffered from various degrees of suppression and assimilation that ranged from political persecution and exile to terror and ethnic cleansing. Despite being recognized in the 1925 constitution as a constitutive entity, the Iraqi Turkmen were later denied this status; hence, cultural rights were gradually taken away and activists were sent to exile.

In 1924, the Iraqi Turkmen were seen as a disloyal remnant of the Ottoman Empire, with a natural tie to Mustafa Kemal Atatürk's new Turkish nationalist ideology emerging in the Republic of Turkey. The Iraqi Turkmen living in the region of Kirkuk were perceived as posing a threat to the stability of Iraq, particularly as they did not support the ascendancy of King Faisal I to the Iraqi throne. On May 4, these tensions boiled over into violence when soldiers from the Iraq Levies- a levied force raised by the British government after the First World War and consisting primarily of Assyrians- clashed with Turkmen in a Kirkuk market square after a dispute between an Assyrian soldier and a Turkmen shopkeeper. In the ensuing fracas, 200 Turkmen were killed by Assyrian soldiers.

Around 20 Iraqi Turkmen civilians were killed by the Iraqi police including women and children on 12 July 1946 in Gavurbağı, Kirkuk.

The Kirkuk massacre of 1959 came about due to the Iraqi government allowing the Iraqi Communist Party, which in Kirkuk was largely Kurdish, to target the Iraqi Turkmen. With the appointment of Maarouf Barzinji, a Kurd, as the mayor of Kirkuk in July 1959, tensions rose following the 14 July revolution celebrations, with animosity in the city polarizing rapidly between the Kurds and Iraqi Turkmen. On 14 July 1959, fights broke out between the Iraqi Turkmen and Kurds, leaving some 20 Iraqi Turkmen dead. Furthermore, on 15 July 1959, Kurdish soldiers of the Fourth Brigade of the Iraqi army mortared Iraqi Turkmen residential areas, destroying 120 houses. Order was restored on 17 July by military units from Baghdad. The Iraqi government referred to the incident as a "massacre" and stated that between 31 and 79 Iraqi Turkmen were killed and some 130 injured.

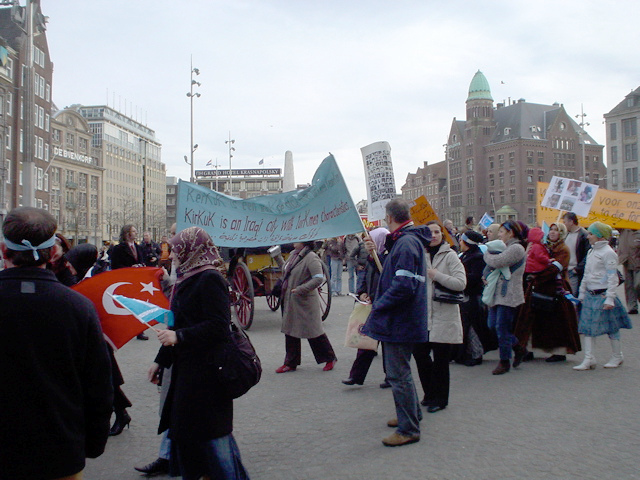
Turks protesting in Amsterdam, the banner reads: 'Kirkuk is an Iraqi city with Turkmen characteristics'.

In 1980, Saddam Hussein's government adopted a policy of assimilation of its minorities. Due to government relocation programs, thousands of Iraqi Turkmen were relocated from their traditional homelands in northern Iraq and replaced by Arabs, in an effort to Arabize the region. Furthermore, Iraqi Turkmen villages and towns were destroyed to make way for Arab migrants, who were promised free land and financial incentives. For example, the Ba'ath regime recognized that the city of Kirkuk was historically an Iraqi Arab city and remained firmly in its cultural orientation. Thus, the first wave of Arabization saw Arab families move from the center and south of Iraq into Kirkuk to work in the expanding oil industry. Although the Iraqi Turkmen were not actively forced out, new Arab quarters were established in the city and the overall demographic balance of the city changed as the Arab migrations continued.

Several presidential decrees and directives from state security and intelligence organizations indicate that the Iraqi Turkmen were a particular focus of attention during the Ba'athist Arabization campaigns in northern Iraq. For example, the Iraqi Military Intelligence issued directive 1559 on 6 May 1980 ordering the deportation of Iraqi Turkmen officials from Kirkuk, issuing the following instructions: "identify the places where Turkmen officials are working in governmental offices [in order] to deport them to other governorates in order to disperse them and prevent them from concentrating in this governorate [Kirkuk]". In addition, on 30 October 1981, the Revolution's Command Council issued decree 1391, which authorized the deportation of Iraqi Turkmen from Kirkuk with paragraph 13 noting that "this directive is specially aimed at Turkmen and Kurdish officials and workers who are living in Kirkuk".

As primary victims of these Arabization policies, the Iraqi Turkmen suffered from land expropriation and job discrimination, and therefore would register themselves as "Arabs" in order to avoid discrimination. Thus, ethnic cleansing was an element of the Ba'athist policy aimed at reducing the influence of the Iraqi Turkmen in northern Iraq's Kirkuk. Those Iraqi Turkmen who remained in cities such as Kirkuk were subject to continued assimilation policies; school names, neighborhoods, villages, streets, markets and even mosques with names of Turkic origin were changed to names that emanated from the Ba'ath Party or from Arab heroes. Moreover, many Iraqi Turkmen villages and neighborhoods in Kirkuk were simply demolished, particularly in the 1990s.

Over 135 Turkmens were massacred in 1991 during the Gulf War by the Iraqi Army.

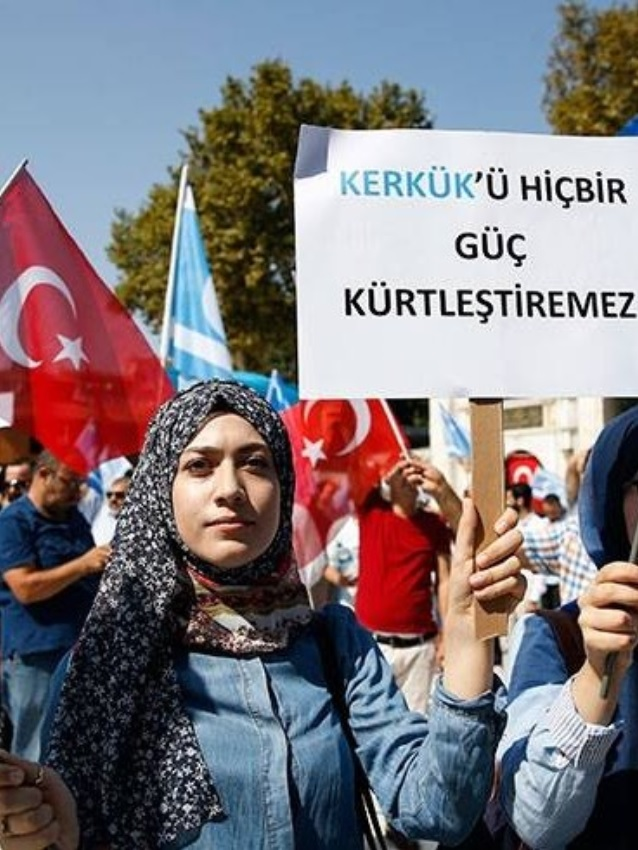
Iraqi Turkmen woman holding a placard written in Turkish: Kerkük'ü hiçbir güç Kürtleştiremez ("No power can Kurdify Kirkuk").

The Kurds claimed de facto sovereignty over land that Iraqi Turkmen regards as theirs. For the Iraqi Turkmen, their identity is deeply inculcated as the rightful inheritors of the region as a legacy of the Ottoman Empire. Thus, it is claimed that the Kurdistan Region and Iraqi government has constituted a threat to the survival of the Iraqi Turkmen through strategies aimed at eradicating or assimilating them. The largest concentration of Iraqi Turkmen tended to be in Tal Afar. The formation of the Kurdistan Region in 1991 created high animosity between the Kurds and Iraqi Turkmen, resulting in some Iraqi Turkmen being victims of Kurdification, according to the Liam Anderson. The largest concentration of Iraqi Turkmen tended to be in the de facto capital of Erbil, a city in which they had assumed prominent administrative and economic positions. Thus, they increasingly came into dispute and often conflict with the ruling powers of the city, which after 1996 was the Kurdistan Democratic Party of Massoud Barzani.

According to Anderson and Stansfield, in the 1990s, tension between the Kurds and Iraqi Turkmen inflamed as the KDP and the Patriotic Union of Kurdistan (PUK) were institutionalized as the political hegemons of the region and, from the perspective of the Iraqi Turkmen, sought to marginalize them from the positions of authority and to subsume their culture with an all-pervading Kurdistani identity. With the support of Ankara, a new political front of Turkmen parties, the Iraqi Turkmen Front (ITF), was formed on 24 April 1995. The relationship between the Iraqi Turkmen Front and the KDP was tense and deteriorated as the decade went on. Iraqi Turkmen associated with the Iraqi Turkmen Front complained about harassment by Kurdish security forces. In March 2000, the Human Rights Watch reported that the KDP's security attacked the offices of the ITF in Erbil, killing two guards, following a lengthy period of disputes between the two parties. In 2002, the KDP created an Iraqi Turkmen political organization, the Turkmen National Association, that supported the further institutionalization of the Kurdistan Region. This was viewed by pro-ITF Iraqi Turkmen as a deliberate attempt to "buy off" Iraqi Turkmen opposition and break their bonds with Ankara. Promoted by the KDP as the "true voice" of the Iraqi Turkmen, the Turkmen National Association has a pro-Kurdistani stance and has effectively weakened the ITF as the sole representative voice of the Iraqi Turkmen. Beginning in 2003, there were riots between Kurds and Turkmen in Kirkuk, a city that Turkmen view as historically theirs. According to United Nations reports, the KRG and Peshmerga were "illegally policing Kirkurk, abducting Turkmen and Arabs and subjecting them to torture". In Tal Afar, between 2003 and 2006, 1,350 Turkmens died and thousands of houses were damaged or demolished, resulting in 4,685 displaced families, largely stemming from sectarian tensions. Later, the Islamic State committed the Iraqi Turkmen genocide.

==== Libya ====
As for the result of the current Libyan conflict since 2014, Libya was divided into two, where the Government of National Accord in Tripoli enjoys military support from Turkey. This has fueled tensions between Ankara and the Tobruk-based government, and anti-Turkish policies have been pursued by them, In 2019, the Tobruk-based army had arrested Turkish nationals, accusing them of sponsoring terrorism. In 2020, over 15 Turkish nationals have been taken into custody for the same reason. Haftar had also ordered shooting down any Turkish ships and interests, banning flights to Turkey.

==== Saudi Arabia ====
Saudi Arabia has a very tense relationship with Turkey, owing it to Ottoman-Saudi War when the Saudis were defeated by the Ottomans, which contributed to the Turkish rule for another century before the collapse of the Ottoman Empire, and its alliance with the Al-Rashid family against the Al-Saud. The tensions rekindled in the 21st century with Erdoğan's desire to "revive the Ottoman Empire", which draws Saudi Arabia to be more antagonistic to Turkey. Saudi Arabia has since then made numerous policies, such as labeling the Ottoman Empire as the occupants of Arabia, financing movies that are deemed anti-Turkish, and recently, banning Turkish websites and leading boycotts against Turkey.

==== Syria ====
From the French mandate era to the Assad regime, the Turkish culture and language have perished for a section of the Syrian Turkmen community. Many Syrian Turkmen have become Arabized and assimilated in areas where they form a minority. Consequently, Arabization is mainly an exception in areas where the Syrian Turkmen live in areas where they form a significant population, where they have continued to maintain their Turkish identity and language despite discriminative state policies.

Since the Turkish annexation of Sanjak of Alexandretta, there is a strong anti-Turkish sentiment among the Syrian population. For the Syrians, the annexation of Alexandretta became a national wound and a symbol of increasing Turkish meddling of Syrian affairs. This had led to the beginning of anti-Turkish discrimination, intensified under the government of Hafez al-Assad and the Arabization process. Syrian Turkmen, suffered discrimination over employment and education and were forbidden from writing and publishing in their native Turkish dialect.

Syrian Turkmen occupied a low rung on the societal ladder, as reported by Al Bawaba, it was stated that Assad always sought to benefit his politically dominant Shiite religious minority. The report quoted Bayırbucak Turkmen as highlighting, "They would take Alawites first no matter what, even if they had degrees, Turkmen couldn't find jobs".

With the beginning of the Syrian Civil War, Syrian Turkmen had sided with the Syrian opposition, which fed the growth of anti-Turkism in Syria. The Syrian Armed Forces, with Russian support, often bombed Syrian Turkmen positions as well as increased xenophobic attacks against Turkmen, accusing them of being Ankara's stooge.

==== United Arab Emirates ====
In December 2017, the UAE's foreign minister, Abdullah bin Zayed Al Nahyan, shared a tweet that claimed an Ottoman general had robbed Medina during Ottoman rule. Emirati diplomat Anwar Gargash then added, "The sectarian and partisan view is not an acceptable alternative, and the Arab world will not be led by Tehran or Ankara."

=== Kurds ===
A 2013 survey of about 7,100 people in Turkey, conducted during the PKK ceasefire, found that Kurds expressed higher tolerance toward Turks than Turks did toward Kurds. Averaged across four social-distance questions, 86.8% of Kurdish respondents said they would accept a Turkish neighbour, tenant, business partner or son/daughter-in-law (13.2% would not), compared with 65.9% of Turkish respondents for Kurds. Among Kurds, 22.3% said they would not accept a Turkish son- or daughter-in-law and 5% said they would not accept a Turkish neighbour. Left-leaning Kurdish respondents were less tolerant of Turks, while religiosity had no statistically significant effect.

=== Europe ===
According to Fatma Müge Göçek the main reasons for anti-Turkish sentiment in Western Europe are Armenian genocide denial and the role of Turkish migrant workers in the economy.

==== Albania ====
In the People's Socialist Republic of Albania, Islamic culture and life was destroyed through state policies and a group of Albanian historians, often with nationalist perspectives promoted in their literature "the Turkish savagery" and Albanian Christian resistance toward the Ottoman Empire. Scholars who opposed anti-Turkish and anti-Muslim narratives were subjected to ostracism and penalties.

In the 2010s, opposition to Turkey building mosques in Albania or exerting its political influence exists among part of the population. They view Turkey as an interfering or autocratic power and Islam as a negative imposed Ottoman legacy.

==== Bulgaria ====
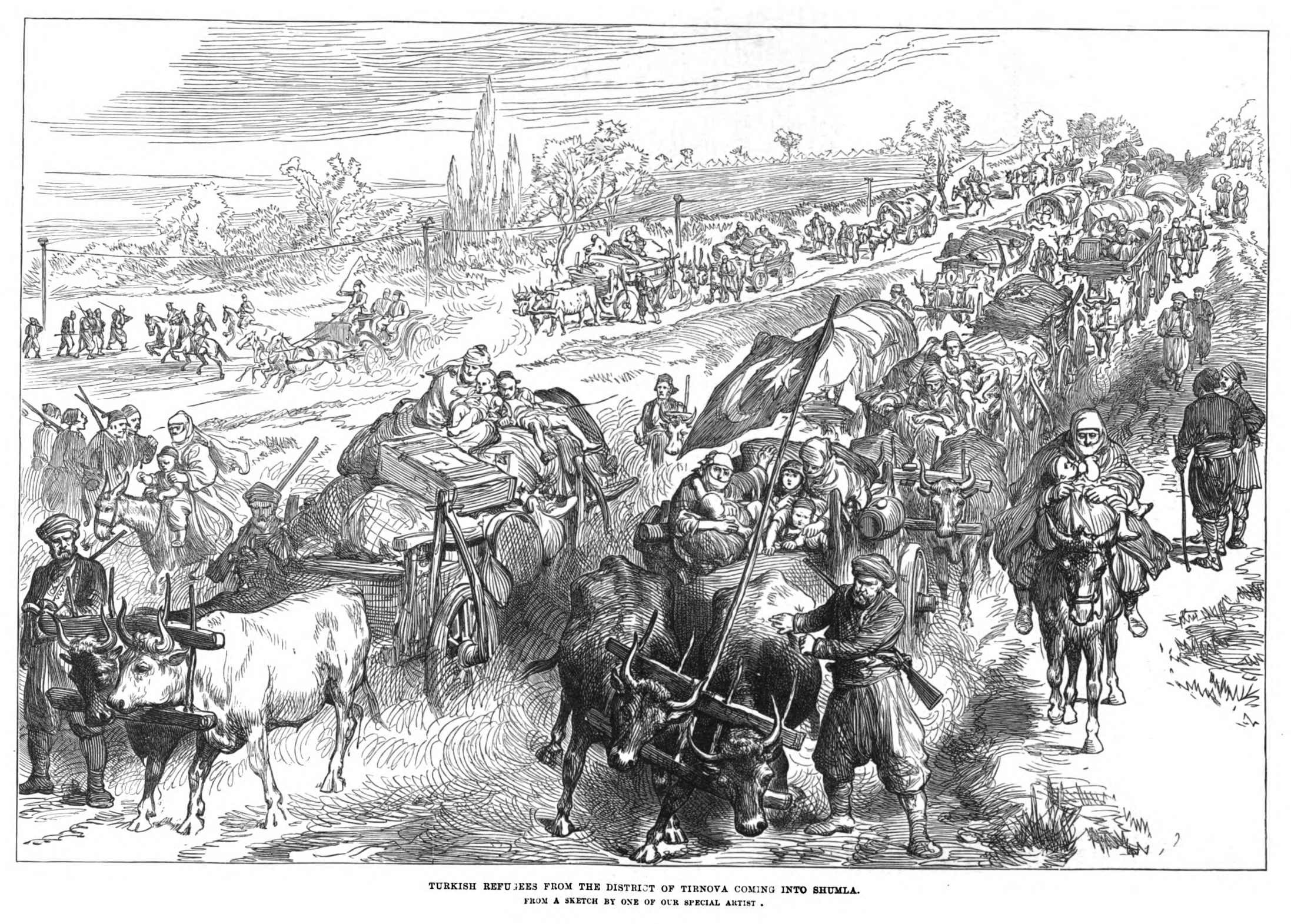
Turkish refugees from the Veliko Tarnovo district coming into Shumen (1877).

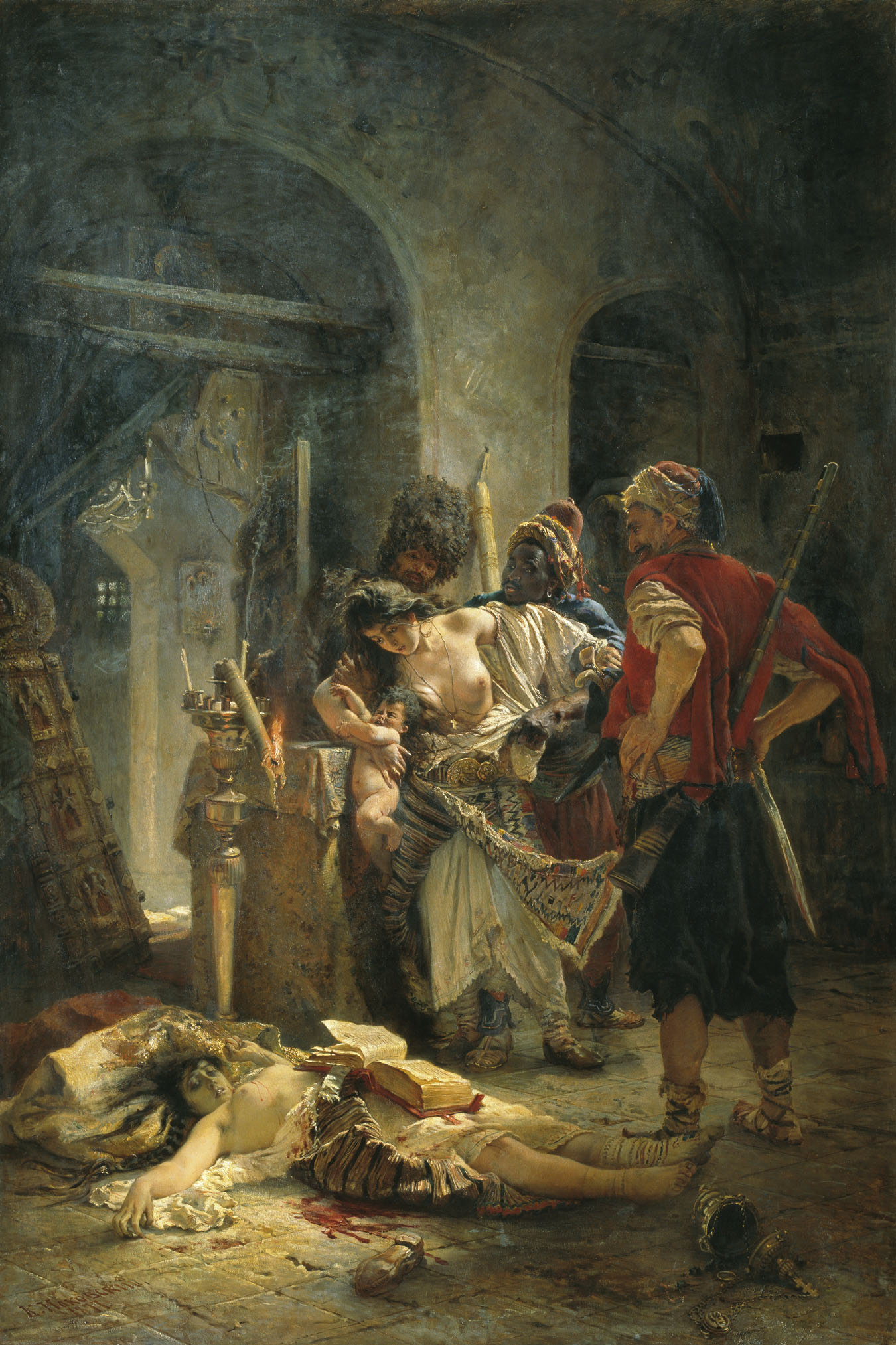
The Bulgarian Martyresses, by Konstantin Makovsky (1877). A painting from the April Uprising, it sparked outrage in the West against Turkish atrocities in Bulgaria.

Before 1878, Turks accounted for an estimated one-third of the population of Bulgaria. In 1876, approximately 70% of the country's arable land belonged to Turks. This number declined from 1923 to 1949, when an estimated 220,000 Turks moved from Bulgaria to Turkey, a migration encouraged by the Turkish government. Another wave of about 155,000 left Bulgaria from 1949 to 1951, many of them forcibly expelled.

In 1984, the government implemented Bulgarisation policies to culturally assimilate Bulgarian Turks. Approximately 800,000 Turks were forced to adopt Bulgarian names. Furthermore, Bulgarian Turks were not allowed to use their Muslim names, speak Turkish in public places, or attend Muslim ceremonies. This assimilation campaign was labelled as an attempt for national revival and was called "The Revival Process".

On 24 December 1984, in the village of Mlechino, Bulgarian police and security forces shot at Turkish protesters when some 200 Turkish villagers from nearby smaller towns gathered to protest for the return of their passports and reinstatement of their Turkish names.

In many Turkish populated areas in Bulgaria, People from smaller towns and villages attempted to gather in larger towns with a government official with greater jurisdiction, to protest against the assimilation policies. These towns were often barricaded by Bulgarian security forces.

On 25 December 1984, close to the town of Benkovski, some 3,000 Turkish protesters from the nearby smaller villages confronted Bulgarian security forces and demanded to have their original identification papers back. The Bulgarian security forces managed to disperse the crowd and urged them to go back to their villages and inquire from the local mayors. After returning to their towns and discovering that the local municipality didn't have their passports and ID documentation the crowd marched back towards the town of Benkovski on the next day (26 December 1984). About 500 armed personnel from Bulgarian security forces were in position. The police presence in the area was previously increased under the guise of "exercise manoeuvres". When the crowd of 2,000 Turkish villagers approached the Bulgarian security forces opened fire with automatic weapons, wounding 8 people and killing 4. One of the killed was a 17-month-old Turkish baby. The victims were from the villages of Kayaloba, Kitna and Mogiljane. The gunshot wounds suggest that the security force had been aiming at the midsection of the bodies. The captured demonstrators were faced down on the snow for 2 hours and blasted with cold water coming from the fire fighting trucks. In a report by Atanas Kadirev the head of the Ministry of Interior Forces in Kardzhali stated "It was interesting how they endured the entire water from the fire fighters' cisterns". The temperature that day was minus 15 degrees Celsius.

On the same day, 26 December 1984, in the village of Gruevo, situated in Momchilgrad county, the Turkish community temporarily resisted the entry of security forces vehicles into the village by burning truck tires on the main road, but the security forces returned at night with reinforcements. The electricity to the village was cut. The villagers organized at the village entrance but were blasted with water from fire trucks. The security forces opened fire at the villagers and several civilians were wounded and killed. The wounded were refused medical treatment. There are reports of incarcerated Turks allegedly committing suicide while held for police questioning. In demonstrations in Momchilgrad at least one 16-year-old was shot and killed and there are reports of casualties also in Dzhebel.

The Bulgarian Ministry of Interior stated "during these few Christmas days there have been some 11 demonstrations in which approximately 11,000 Turks participated." A large number of the arrested protesters were later sent to the Belene labour camp at the gates of which it is written "All Bulgarian citizens are equal under the laws of the People's Republic of Bulgaria"

One of the most notable confrontations between the ethnic Turk population and the Bulgarian State Security apparatus and army was in the village of Yablanovo during January 1985 where the Turkish population resisted the tanks of the 3rd Bulgarian Army for 3 days. When the village was overrun the town hall was made into a temporary Command Centre where imprisoned Turks were tortured. The torture and violation was later continued in the underground cellars of the Ministry of Interior in the city of Sliven. Over 30 people are reported killed during the events in Yablanovo.

These events led to the beginning of the revival of the Turkish minority identity in Bulgaria and protests took place in some of the bigger settlements in the southern and northern Turk enclaves. Moreover, the Turkish community received the solidarity of Bulgarian intellectuals and opponents of the regime.

This led, a few years later, to the biggest exodus in Europe since World War II: After the Bulgaria–Turkey border was opened in June 1989, approximately 350,000 Turks left Bulgaria on tourist visas in the span of three months. Eventually, more than 150,000 Turks returned to Bulgaria—especially after the removal of Todor Zhivkov from power—but more than 200,000 chose to remain in Turkey permanently.

Former Bulgarian prime minister, Boyko Borisov, has been accused of having anti-Turkish tendencies. In December 2009, he backed a referendum, proposed by the nationalist party Attack (Bulgarian: Атака), on whether to allow daily Turkish-language news broadcasts on Bulgarian National Television, although he later withdrew his support. Recep Tayyip Erdoğan, then the Turkish prime minister, "expressed his concern of rising anti-Turkish sentiments in Bulgaria" to the Bulgarian prime minister. The Turkish Foreign Ministry also "expressed its concern over the rising heated rhetoric in Bulgaria". According to a report by Ivan Dikov, "not just Атака but a large number of Bulgarians have resented the news in Turkish".

Borisov also referred to Turks (and Romani) as "bad human material" in 2009. The vice president of the Party of European Socialists, Jan Marinus Wiersma, said Borisov had "crossed the invisible line between right wing populism and extremism".

Some Bulgarian historians consider Bulgars, a semi-nomadic Turkic people, as Iranian. According to Raymond Detrez, the Iranian theory is rooted in the periods of anti-Turkish sentiment in Bulgaria and is ideologically motivated. Since 1989, anti-Turkish rhetoric is now reflected in the theories that challenge the thesis of the proto-Bulgars' Turkic origin. Alongside the Iranian or Aryan theory, there appeared arguments favoring an autochthonous origin.

Example for recent confrontation between the Turkish population of Bulgaria and Bulgarian politicians is Banya Bashi Mosque clashes

==== Belgium ====
There are approximately 290,000 Turkish citizens living in Belgium, The majority of whom left to Belgium in the 1950s. In the past several years, many right and left wings Belgian political parties criticized domestic Turkish politics and called for banning or deporting Turkish immigrants.

In 2015, a female employee shouted "Dirty Turk" (in Dutch: 'Vuile Turk') at a Supervisor of Turkish origin in the Volvo car factory in Ghent, which led to a Strike action by Turkish workers at the factory.

Filip Dewinter a right-wing Flemish nationalist party member said in May 2017 at TV-program De Zevende Dag,

The solution is for Turkish minorities in Flemish region, another method should be applied not only integrate Turks into Flemish culture but assimilate Turks. Leave identity behind leaving culture behind and fully assimilate in our society, if not so return to the country of origin is the only solution.

==== Cyprus ====
The island of Cyprus became an independent state in 1960, with power shared between Greek Cypriots and Turkish Cypriots under the London–Zürich Agreements. But in December 1963, in events that became known as Bloody Christmas in which 364 Turks were killed, Turkish Cypriots were ousted from the republic and Greek Cypriots began a military campaign against them, leading to 11 years of ethnic clashes. Turkish Cypriots bore the heavier cost in terms of casualties, and some 25,000—about a fifth of the population of Turkish Cypriots—were internally displaced. Thousands of Turkish Cypriot houses left behind were ransacked or completely destroyed. They lived as refugees for at least ten years, until the 1974 Turkish invasion. By the late 1960s, approximately 60,000 Turkish Cypriots had left their homes and moved into enclaves. This resulted in an exodus of Turkish Cypriots, with the majority migrating to the United Kingdom and others to Turkey, North America, and Australia.

On 13 February 1963 Greeks and Greek Cypriots attacked the Turkish Cypriot quarter of Limassol with tanks killing 16 and injuring 35 Turks. Between 11 and 13 May 1964, Cypriot Police executed much as 28 Turkish Cypriot civilians in Famagusta and Akrotiri and Dhekelia. On 14 and 15 November 1967, Greek Cypriots murdered 26 Turkish Cypriots during their retreat from Kofinou.

Numerous atrocities against the Turkish Cypriot community were committed in response to the Turkish invasion of Cyprus. In the Maratha, Santalaris and Aloda massacre by EOKA B, 126 people were killed on 14 August 1974. The United Nations described the massacre as a crime against humanity, by saying "constituting a further crime against humanity committed by the Greek and Greek Cypriot gunmen." In the Tochni massacre, 85 Turkish Cypriot inhabitants were massacred. During the Alaminos massacre, 13 or 15 Turkish men were executed.

The Washington Post covered another atrocity in which it is written that: "In a Greek raid on a small Turkish village near Limassol, 36 people out of a population of 200 were killed. The Greeks said that they had been given orders to kill the inhabitants of the Turkish villages before the Turkish forces arrived."

In Limassol, upon the fall of the Turkish Cypriot enclave to the Cypriot National Guard on 20 July 1974, the Turkish Cypriot quarter was burned, women raped and children shot according to Turkish Cypriot and Greek Cypriot eyewitness accounts. 1300 people were then led to a prison camp.

On 12 July 2020, The primate of the Church of Cyprus, Archbishop Chrysostomos II has expressed his opinions regarding the reversion of the Hagia Sophia museum to a mosque stating that "The Turks have remained uncivilized, they are rude, and they will remain [this way]." He added that "Turkey has learned to destroy, it has learned to appropriate the cultures of others and sometimes, when it does not benefit it, it destroys them and falsely presents cultures as its own."

==== Germany ====
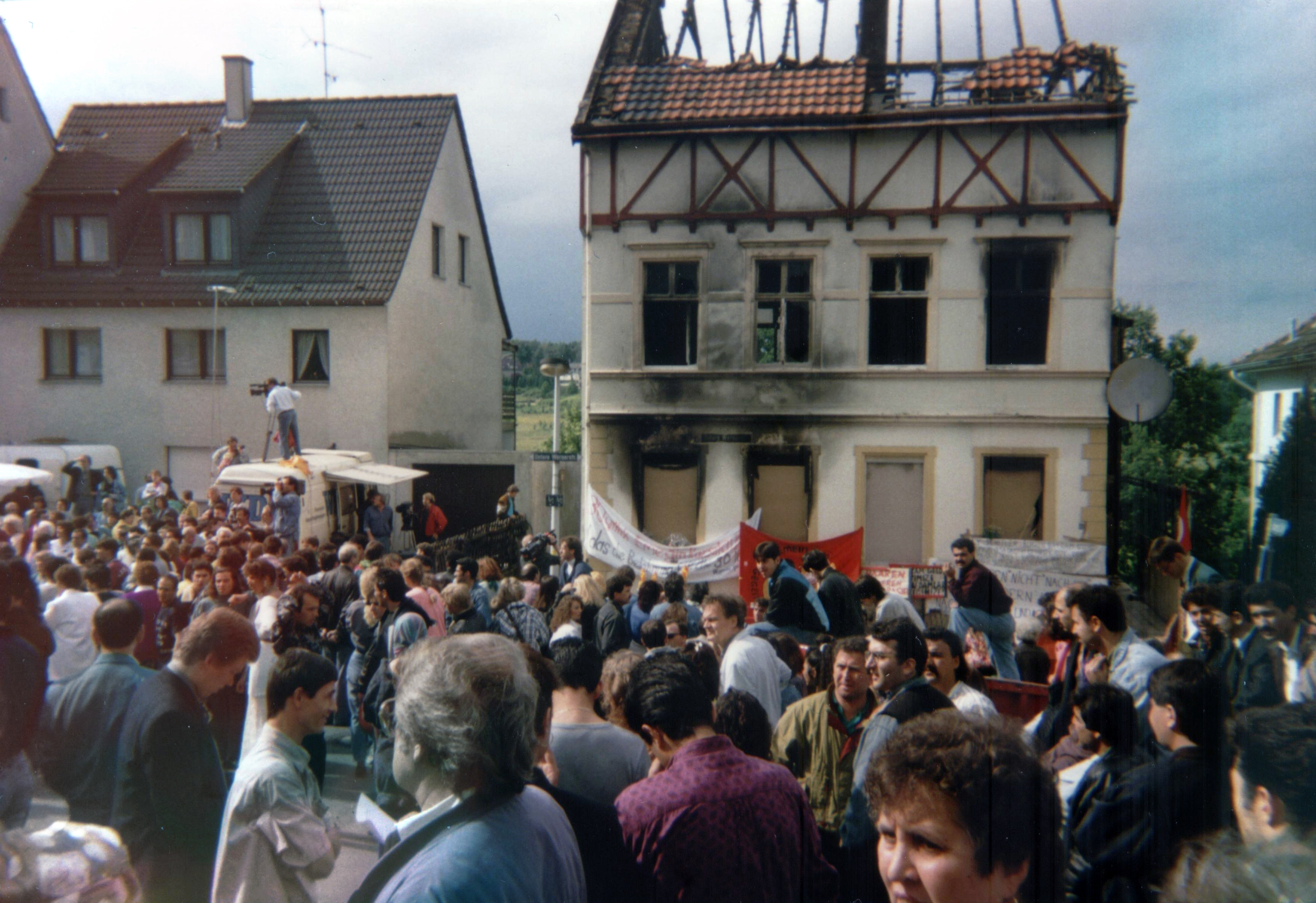
The Solingen arson attack of 1993, in which neo-Nazis set fire to a Turkish family's home, was one of the most severe instances of xenophobic violence in modern Germany.

Turks are "the most prominent ethnic minority group in contemporary Germany", and discrimination and violence against them are common. In public discourse and popular jokes, they are often portrayed as "ludicrously different in their food tastes, dress, names, and even in their ability to develop survival techniques".

The number of violent acts by right-wing extremists in Germany increased dramatically between 1990 and 1992. On November 25, 1992, three Turkish residents were killed in a firebombing in Mölln, a town in northern Germany. And on May 29, 1993, in an arson attack in Solingen, five members of a Turkish family that had resided in Germany for 23 years were burnt to death. Several neighbors heard someone shout "Heil Hitler!" before dousing the front porch and door with gasoline and setting fire to the home. Most Germans condemned these attacks, and many marched in candlelight processions.

According to Greg Nees, "because Turks are both darker-skinned and Muslim, conservative Germans are largely against granting them citizenship".

==== Greece ====
A member of the European parliament from the Greek far-right Golden Dawn party, former army lieutenant general Eleftherios Synadinos has been expelled from a European Parliament plenary session after a racist remark, stating that "As it has been expressed in scientific literature, the Turks are dirty and polluted. Turks are like wild dogs when they play but when they have to fight against their enemies they run away. The only effective way to deal with the Turks is with decisive and resolute attitudes."

Ioannis Lagos, who has been a Greek lawmaker serving as a Member of the European Parliament, has tore a Turkish flag made of paper into pieces in January 2020 during a session of debate for the humanitarian situation on the Greek islands due to illegal immigrations.

The former Greek Minister for Foreign Affairs Theodoros Pangalos stated in 2002 that Turks have been being allowed "to drag their bloodstained boots across the carpet" in the European Union capitals and has labelled Turks as "bandits, murderers, and rapists".

==== Netherlands ====
Turks are the largest ethnic minority group in the Netherlands. The first recorded attack on Turks in the Netherlands were the Afrikaanderwijk riots. Although policies toward Turks in the Netherlands are more progressive than those in many other European countries, such as Germany, in a report on the Netherlands in 2008, the European Commission against Racism and Intolerance wrote that the Turkish minority had been particularly affected by "stigmatization of and discrimination against members of minority groups". The report also noted that "the tone of Dutch political and public debate around integration and other issues relevant to ethnic minorities has experienced a dramatic deterioration".

According to the European Network Against Racism, an international organization supported by the European Commission, half of all Turks in the Netherlands report having experienced racial discrimination. The network also noted "dramatic growth" of Islamophobia. In 2001, another international organization, the European Monitoring Centre on Racism and Xenophobia, highlighted a negative trend in Dutch attitudes towards minorities, compared with average European Union results. That analysis also noted that, compared to other Europeans, the Dutch were "more in favor of cultural assimilation of minorities" rather than "cultural enrichment by minority groups".

==== Malta ====
The Maltese have a colourful vocabulary stemming from their fight against the Ottoman Empire during the Great Siege of Malta in 1565. For example, the expression tgħammed tork is used when the sun is visible during rainfall; it means "a Turk has been baptised", which was considered a rare event. The phrase twieled tork ("a Turk was born") is also used. Another expression is ħaqq għat-torok ("curse on the Turks"), used when something goes wrong.

=== Former Soviet Union ===
==== Armenia ====
According to a survey conducted in 2007, 78% of Armenians see Turkey as a threat.

==== Georgia ====
Georgians look with a wary eye to Turkey's growing Neo-Ottomanism and the rise in popularity of irredentist maps showing Turkey with borders expanded into the former Ottoman Empire, usually including Adjara.

Although some Turks have since come back to Meskheti (which is near the Turkish-Georgian border), the Georgians and Armenians who settled in their homes have vowed to take up arms against any who return. Many Georgians have also argued that the Meskhetian Turks should be sent to Turkey, "where they belong".

==== Russia ====
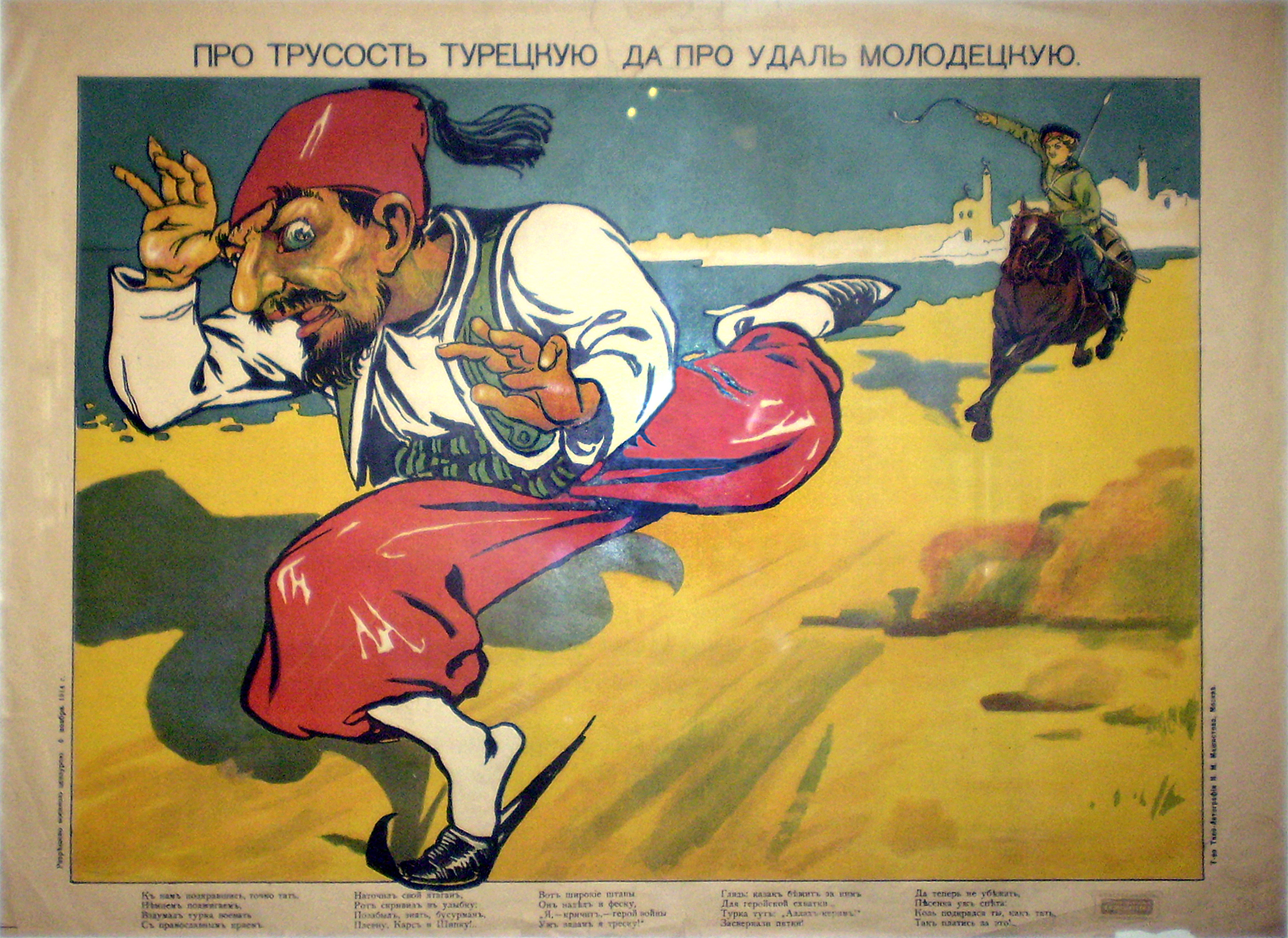
A World War I Russian propaganda poster depicting a Turk running away from a Russian

According to Stanford University history professor Robert D. Crews, Russia has been historically more tolerant towards Turkic people than any other European administrations, and many Turkic people (Volga Tatars, Bashkirs, Karachays, Nogais, Kazakhs, Chuvash, for example), most of them Muslims, were fairly treated under Tsarist Russia. However, not all Turkic peoples received such generous treatment, for instance, Crimean Tatars under Russian Tsarist administration were forced to leave their houses for Turkey due to Russian colonial politics in the Crimean peninsula.

In the Soviet Union, the NKVD and the Red Army carried out ethnic cleansing during World War II through mass deportations of Turks. In June 1945, Vyacheslav Molotov, the Soviet minister of foreign affairs, formally demanded that Turkey surrender three provinces (Kars, Ardahan, and Artvin), and Moscow was also preparing to support Armenian claims to several other provinces. War against Turkey seemed possible, and Joseph Stalin wanted to drive out Turks (especially in Meskheti) who were likely to be hostile to Soviet intentions. The campaign is relatively poorly documented, but Soviet sources suggest that 115,000 Turks were deported, mainly to Central Asia. Most of them settled in Uzbekistan, but many others died along the way.

More recently, some Turks in Russia, especially Meskhetian Turks in Krasnodar, have faced human rights violations, including deprivation of citizenship and prohibitions on employment and owning property. Since 2004, many Turks have left the Krasnodar region for the United States as refugees. They are still barred from full repatriation to Georgia.

Vladimir Zhirinovsky claimed that "nothing will happen to the world even if the entire Turkic nation perishes".

==== Uzbekistan ====
While Turkey and Uzbekistan have a fair relationship for being commonly Turkic, some tensions were witnessed due to differences in history, as Turks are of Oghuz origin while Uzbeks are of Karluk branch.

In 1989, 103 people died and more than 1,000 were wounded in ethnic clashes between Turks and Uzbeks. Some 700 houses were destroyed, and more than 90,000 Meskhetian Turks were driven out of Uzbekistan. Many Turks see these events as their "second deportation". Those who remained in Uzbekistan complained of ethnic discrimination.

=== Former Yugoslavia ===
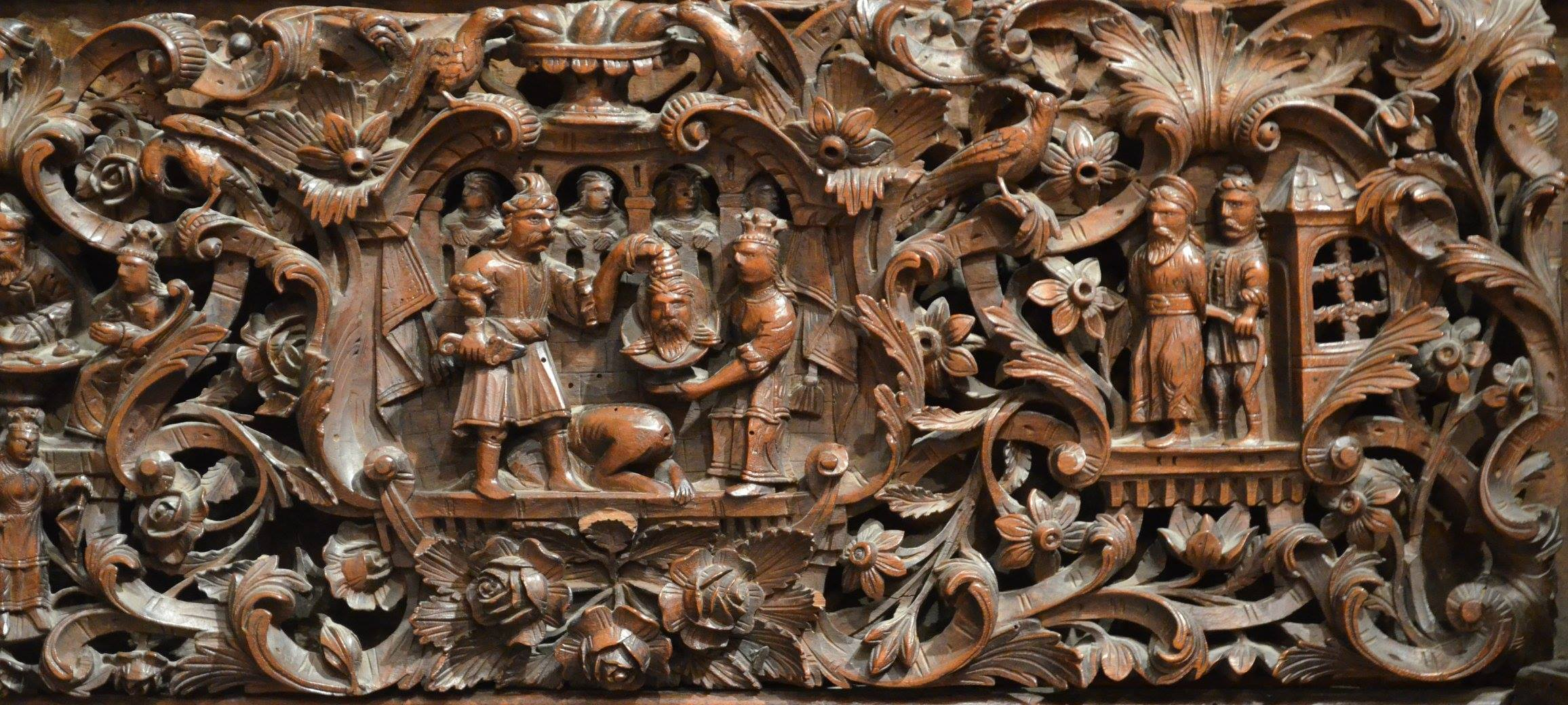
Iconostasis in the Church of the Ascension of Jesus, Skopje from 1867, North Macedonia. The Beheading of John the Baptist is carried out by figures stylized like Ottoman Turks.

After the Ottoman Empire fell in the early 20th century, many Turks fled as Muhacirs (refugees). Others intermarried or simply identified themselves as Yugoslavs or Albanians to avoid stigma and persecution.

Historically, from the Ottoman conquest through the 19th century, many ethnically non-Turkish groups—especially the Muslim Slavs of the Balkans—were referred to in local languages as Turks. This usage is common in literature, including in the works of Ivan Mažuranić and Petar II Petrović-Njegoš. The religious ideology of Christoslavism, coined by Michael Sells, holds that "Slavs are Christian by nature and that any conversion from Christianity is a betrayal of the Slavic race". Under this ideology, as seen in Croatian and Serbian nationalism, South Slavic Muslims are not regarded as part of their ethnic kin; by virtue of their Muslim faith, they become "Turks".

==== North Macedonia ====
When North Macedonia proclaimed its independence in 1991, the Macedonian state implemented nationalist politics, which aimed to assimilate Macedonian Muslims into a broader category of "Macedonians". The government banned education in Turkish in all regions to "prevent Turkification". This, however, was met with resistance by Muslims who did not support the association and wanted to learn Turkish and continue their education in Turkish. The protests failed, although one person applied to the European Court of Human Rights. The case revolved around rights to education in the mother tongue.

==== Serbia ====
During the Great Eastern Crisis more than 10,000 Muslims, including Turks, were forced to left the territory of the Serbian Principality in 1862.

===== Bosnian War =====
Ratko Mladić, Radovan Karadžić's military chief and fellow convicted criminal of genocide, crimes against humanity and war crimes, described the conquest of Srebrenica and the ensuing massacre as an opportunity for "the Serbs to avenge themselves on the Turks".

On July 11, 1995, the town of Srebrenica fell to the Bosnian Serb Army. Its commander Ratko Mladić made his infamous statement at the same day, which has been used against him during International Criminal Tribunal for the former Yugoslavia, while he and his entourage posing for cameras with the town in the background:

Here we are, on July 11, 1995, in Serb Srebrenica. On the eve of yet another great Serb holiday, we give this town to the Serb people as a gift. Finally, after the Rebellion against the Dahis, the time has come to take revenge on the Turks in this region.

=== Turkish-on-Turkish prejudice and discrimination ===
A medium documented prejudice and hostility (and counter hostility) between the so-called White Turks and so-called Black Turks has long existed in Turkish society ever since the founding of the Turkish state in 1923. However these tensions escalated in the 1990s when the religious rural class began to appear in the urban centers and show a different image of the so-called "secular country."

The Europeanized urban class termed the influx of the religious rural class as an "invasion."

=== Other countries ===
==== United States ====
Anti-Turkism first appeared in the United States during World War I, when the Armenian genocide began and was reported by American newspapers. These reports had reinforced a sense of solidarity to Armenians and increasingly anti-Turkish rhetorics in the United States, with the Turks being equally seen as a barbaric people.

==== Israel ====
As a result of the increasing Anti-Zionist and antisemitic sentiment by Turkish President Recep Tayyip Erdoğan, and growing Israeli assertiveness, in particular toward the issue over the Armenian genocide, Turkish-Israeli relations have been greatly damaged. However, Israelis have generally reserved criticism for only the Turkish government, partly due to their tie with fellow Turkic Azerbaijan.

After the 2010 Gaza flotilla raid, where 10 Turks were killed, and the subsequent diplomatic crisis between Israel and Turkey, the number of Israeli tourists to Turkey shrunk to 100,000 as Israelis preferred to "refrain from visiting the country that was seen to be hostile to them".

In 2019, Benjamin Netanyahu's son, Yair Netanyahu, published a tweet remarking that Istanbul was once called Constantinople, a centre of Orthodox Christianity before "Turkish occupation" of the city, sparking a political crisis between Turkey and Israel.

On 12 July 2020, a group of nine Israelis made up of Christians and Jews burned the Turkish flag at the Turkish embassy in Tel Aviv in response to Erdoğan's decision to convert Hagia Sophia back into a mosque. They were later detained by Israeli police.

On 10 February 2023, Israeli top rabbi Shmuel Eliyahu claimed that the earthquake that devastated Turkey was "a divine punishment" because the Turkish government had "defamed" Israel.

==== New Zealand ====
The guns and magazines used by Brenton Tarrant, the perpetrator of the Christchurch mosque shootings, were covered in white writing naming historical events, people, and motifs related to historical conflicts, wars, and battles between Muslims and European Christians, as well as the names of recent Islamic terrorist attack victims and the names of far-right attackers. Notable references from Ottoman history included Skanderbeg (an Albanian nobleman who led an uprising against the Ottoman Empire), Antonio Bragadin (a Venetian officer who broke an agreement and killed Turkish captives), 1683 (which is the date of the Second Siege of Vienna), Miloš Obilić (who is said to have killed the Ottoman Emperor Murat I in Battle of Kosovo in 1389), János Hunyadi (who had blocked Ottoman attempts to take Belgrade), Ernst Rüdiger von Starhemberg (who defeated the Ottomans in 1683), the Battle of Kahlenberg (which marked the beginning of the Ottoman withdrawal from the Siege of Vienna) and "Turkofagos" (Turk eater), the nickname of Greek War of Independence revolutionary Nikitaras, which he used to shoot 91 people with, 51 fatal (one Turkish) and 40 wounded.

His 'manifesto' specifically refers to Turks and utters threats against Turkey, that Istanbul's mosques will be destroyed and Hagia Sophia will be Christianized.

He also identifies himself as a "kebab removalist", referencing to the anti-Muslim 'remove kebab' meme often used by the far-right ultra-nationalists and Islamophobes, that originated from Serbia and the Fourteen Words. He was also playing an associated propaganda song in his car before the shooting.

== In contemporary media ==
=== Movies ===
==== Dracula Untold ====
The film has been accused of Islamophobia for the vilification of Mehmed II and for portraying the figure of Vlad the Impaler as a hero even though, according to Turkish journalist Elest Ali Korkmaz, he "indiscriminately killed Turks and Bulgarians" in real history.

==== Midnight Express ====
Midnight Express is criticized for its unfavorable portrayal of Turkish people.

In her 1991 book Turkish Reflections: A Biography of Place, Mary Lee Settle wrote: 'The Turks I saw in Lawrence of Arabia and Midnight Express were like cartoon caricatures, compared to the people I had known and lived among for three of the happiest years of my life.'

Pauline Kael, in reviewing the film for The New Yorker, commented, 'This story could have happened in almost any country, but if Billy Hayes had planned to be arrested to get the maximum commercial benefit from it, where else could he get the advantages of a Turkish jail? Who wants to defend Turks? (They don't even constitute enough of a movie market for Columbia Pictures to be concerned about how they are represented.)'

One reviewer, writing for World Film Directors, wrote: "Midnight Express is 'more violent, as a national hate-film than anything I can remember', 'a cultural form that narrows horizons, confirming the audience's meanest fears and prejudices and resentments'."

David Denby of New York criticized Midnight Express as 'merely anti-Turkish, and hardly a defense of prisoners' rights or a protest against prison conditions'. Denby said also that all Turks in the movie — guardian or prisoner — were portrayed as 'losers' and 'swine', and that 'without exception [all the Turks] are presented as degenerate, stupid slobs'.

Turkish Cypriot film director Derviş Zaim wrote a thesis at the University of Warwick on the representation of Turks in the film, in which he concluded that the one-dimensional portrayal of the Turks as 'terrifying' and 'brutal' served merely to reinforce the sensational outcome, and was likely influenced by such factors as Orientalism and Capitalism.

==== Saturday Night Live ====
Canadian-Greek actress Nia Vardalos, participated in a Saturday Night Live episode where Turks were portrayed as dirty, smoking, ragtag, nose picking and anti-Armenian characters, which was heavily criticized by the Turkish Forum, a network of expat Turks which protested NBC and asked for a public apology, and the show received heavy criticism by the Turks on the internet.

== Expressions containing the word "Turk" in various languages ==
- France: In old French, terms such as "C'est un vrai Turc" ("A true Turk") were used to refer to brutish and cruel individuals.
- Greece: In Greek, the expression "έγινε Τούρκος" ("he became a Turk") is used metaphorically to describe someone who has become extremely angry or enraged. The expression "καπνίζει σαν Τούρκος" ("smokes like a Turk") is also used to describe someone who smokes heavily.
- Italy: In contemporary Italian, phrases such as "bestemmia come un Turco" ("Cursing like a Turk") and "puzza come un Turco" ("Stinking like a Turk") were used. The phrase "fumare come un turco" ("Smoking like a Turk") is used to indicate excessive consumption of tobacco.
- Netherlands: Some offensive expressions are "Eruit zien als een Turk" ("to look like a Turk"), which means to "seem filthy", "repulsive", or "Rijden als een Turk" ("to drive like a Turk"), meaning "to drive recklessly".
- Germany: The common German expression "etwas türken" ("to turk something") is used to describe the act of faking something.
- Norway: In Norwegian, the expression "Sint som en tyrker" is used, meaning "angry as a Turk".
- Romania: In Romanian, it is common to call someone "a Turk" if they are stubborn and unable to understand.
- Spain: Spanish people used to say "turco" when they wanted to insult another person.
- United Kingdom: In English, phrases such as "Johnny Turk", "out-paramour the Turk", "turn Turk" and "young Turk" were historically used.
- Sweden: In Swedish, there is a racist rhyming phrase "turk på burk smakar urk" (literally "canned Turk tastes bleh"), which has been associated with anti-Turkish sentiment.
- Iran: In Persian, there is a racist slur known as "Torkeh Khaar", which translates to "Turkish Donkey". It is used against Iranian Azerbaijanis.
- Colombia, Venezuela: In Colombia and Venezuela, people used to say "turco" to refer to tricksters, usurers and descendants of Arabs who migrated during the Ottoman Empire.

== See also ==
- Xenophobia and discrimination in Turkey
- List of massacres in Turkey
- Human rights in Turkey
- Anti-Azerbaijani sentiment
- Anti-Arab sentiment
- Anti-Hungarian sentiment
- Anti–Middle Eastern sentiment
- Anti-Mongolianism
- Index of racism-related articles
- Insulting Turkishness
- Islamophobia
- List of massacres of Turkish people
- Persecution of Iraqi Turkmen in Ba'athist Iraq
- Persecution of Muslims
- Persecution of Muslims during the Ottoman contraction
- Racism against Asians
- Red Jews
- Remove Kebab
- Tatarophobia

== Bibliography ==
- Anderson, Liam D.; Stansfield, Gareth R. V. (2009), Crisis in Kirkuk: The Ethnopolitics of Conflict and Compromise, University of Pennsylvania Press, ISBN 978-0-8122-4176-1
- Aydıngün, Ayşegül; Harding, Çigğdem Balım; Hoover, Matthew; Kuznetsov, Igor; Swerdlow, Steve (2006), Meskhetian Turks: An Introduction to their History, Culture, and Resettelment Experiences (PDF), Center for Applied Linguistics, archived from the original (PDF) on 2007-07-14
- Barton, Frederick D.; Heffernan, John; Armstrong, Andrea (2002), Being Recognised as Citizens (PDF), Commission on Human Security, archived from the original (PDF) on 2011-07-17
- Bennigsen, Alexandre; Broxup, Marie (1983). The Islamic threat to the Soviet state. London: Croom Helm. ISBN 0-7099-0619-6.
- Blacklock, Denika (2005), FINDING DURABLE SOLUTIONS FOR THE MESKHETIANS (PDF), EUROPEAN CENTRE FOR MINORITY ISSUES, archived from the original (PDF) on 2010-06-02
- Çetin, Turhan (2008), "THE SOCIO-ECONOMIC OUTCOMES OF THE LAST TURKISH MIGRATION (1989) FROM BULGARIA TO TURKEY", Turkish Studies, 3 (7): 241–270
- Cohen, Roberta; Deng, Francis Mading (1998), The Forsaken People: Case Studies of the Internally Displaced, Brookings Institution Press, ISBN 978-0-8157-1514-6.
- Cornelius, Wayne; Martin, Philip; Hollifield, James (1994), Controlling Immigration: A Global Perspective, Stanford University Press, ISBN 978-0-8047-2498-2.
- Cornell, Svante E. (2001), Small nations and great powers: a study of ethnopolitical conflict in the Caucasus, Routledge, ISBN 978-0-7007-1162-8.
- Coşkun, Ufuk (2009), AHISKA/MESKHETIAN TURKS IN TUCSON: AN EXAMINATION OF ETHNIC IDENTITY (PDF), UNIVERSITY OF ARIZONA, archived from the original (PDF) on 2012-01-11
- Demirtaş-Coşkun, Birgül (2010), "Reconsidering the Cyprus Issue: An Anatomy of Failure og European Catalyst (1995–2002)", in Laçiner, Sedat; Özcan, Mehmet; Bal, İhsan (eds.), USAK Yearbook of International Politics and Law 2010, Vol. 3, USAK Books, ISBN 978-605-4030-26-2.
- Drobizheva, Leokadia; Gottemoeller, Rose; Kelleher, Catherine McArdle (1998), Ethnic Conflict in the Post-Soviet World: Case Studies and Analysis, M.E. Sharpe, ISBN 978-1-56324-741-5.
- Dummett, Michael (2001), On Immigration and Refugees, Routledge, ISBN 978-0-415-22707-0.
- Eminov, Ali (1997), Turkish and other Muslim minorities in Bulgaria, Routledge, ISBN 978-0-415-91976-0.
- Hirschon, Renée (2003), Crossing the Aegean: An Appraisal of the 1923 Compulsory Population Exchange Between Greece and Turkey, Berghahn Books, ISBN 978-1-57181-562-0.
- Hüssein, Serkan (2007), Yesterday & Today: Turkish Cypriots of Australia, Serkan Hussein, ISBN 978-0-646-47783-1.
- International Crisis Group (2006). Iraq and the Kurds: The Brewing Battle Over Kirkuk (PDF) (Report). International Crisis Group.
- Jenkins, Gareth (2008). "Turkey and Northern Iraq: An Overview" (PDF). The Jamestown Foundation. Archived from the original (PDF) on 2012-01-12.
- Katsikas, Stefanos (2010), Bulgaria and Europe: Shifting Identities, Anthem Press, ISBN 978-1-84331-846-0.
- Kliot, Nurat (2007). "Resettlement of refugees in Finland and Cyprus: a comparative analysis and possible lessons for Israel". In Kacowicz, Arie Marcelo; Lutomski, Pawel (eds.). Population Resettlement in International Conflicts: A Comparative Study. Lexington Books. p. 59. ISBN 978-0-7391-1607-4.
- Knowlton, MaryLee (2005), Macedonia, Marshall Cavendish, ISBN 978-0-7614-1854-2.
- Lee, Martin (1999), The Beast Reawakens, Taylor & Francis, ISBN 978-0-415-92546-4.
- Levinson, David (1998), Ethnic groups worldwide: a ready reference handbook, Greenwood Publishing Group, ISBN 978-1-57356-019-1.
- Minahan, James (2002), Encyclopedia of the Stateless Nations: L-R, Greenwood Publishing Group, ISBN 978-0-313-32111-5.
- Nees, Greg (2000), Germany: Unraveling an Enigma, Intercultural Press, ISBN 978-1-877864-75-9.
- Neuburger, Mary (2004), The Orient within: Muslim minorities and the negotiation of nationhood in modern Bulgaria, Cornell University Press, ISBN 978-0-8014-4132-5.
- Papadakis, Yiannis (2005), Echoes from the Dead Zone: Across the Cyprus divide, I.B.Tauris, ISBN 978-1-85043-428-3.
- Ramet, Sabrina (1999), The Radical Right in Central and Eastern Europe Since 1989, Penn State Press, ISBN 978-0-271-01811-9.
- Savvides, Philippos K (2004), "Partition Revisited: The International Dimension and the Case of Cyprus", in Danopoulos, Constantine Panos; Vajpeyi, Dhirendra K.; Bar-Or, Amir (eds.), Civil-military relations, nation building, and national identity: comparative perspectives, Greenwood Publishing Group, ISBN 978-0-275-97923-2.
- Schnabel, Albrecht; Carment, David (2004). Conflict prevention from rhetoric to reality, Volume 1. Lexington Books. ISBN 0-7391-0738-0..
- Solsten, Eric (1999), Germany: A Country Study, DIANE Publishing, ISBN 978-0-7881-8179-5.
- Staab, Andreas (1998), National Identity in Eastern Germany: Inner Unification or Continued Separation?, Greenwood Publishing Group, ISBN 978-0-275-96177-0.
- Stansfield, Gareth R. V. (2007). Iraq : people, history, politics. Cambridge: Polity. ISBN 978-0-7456-3227-8.
- Ther, Philipp; Siljak, Ana (2001), Redrawing nations: ethnic cleansing in East-Central Europe, 1944–1948, Rowman & Littlefield, ISBN 978-0-7425-1094-4.
- Tocci, Nathalie (2004), EU accession dynamics and conflict resolution: catalysing peace or consolidating partition in Cyprus?, Ashgate Publishing, ISBN 978-0-7546-4310-4.
- Tocci, Nathalie (2007), The EU and conflict resolution: promoting peace in the backyard, Routledge, ISBN 978-0-415-41394-7.
