= Erland =

- Pronunciation: ˈɛər.lənd
- Gender: Male

Origin
- Meaning: Foreigner, eagle's land
- Region of origin: Scandinavia

Erland is a Nordic male given name with several possible origins. It likely comes from the Old Norse erlendr or ørlendr, meaning foreigner, or from ern (eagle) and land, giving the poetic meaning “eagle’s land.” The name is earliest attested in a Norwegian runestone as arlantr.

== Notable people ==
- Erland Almqvist (1912–1999), Swedish sailor who competed in the 1952 Summer Olympics
- Leif Erland Andersson (1944–1979), Swedish astronomer
- Erland Asdahl (1921–1988), Norwegian politician for the Centre Party
- Erland Carlsson (1822–1893), Swedish-American Lutheran Minister
- Gawain Erland Cooper, Orcadian and Scottish folk guitarist and singer
- Erland Dryselius (Benedikt, Brodderi) Dryselius (1641–1708), Swedish priest, historian and translator
- Erland Erlandson (c. 1790 – 1875), Dano-Canadian explorer and fur trader
- Bengt Erland Fogelberg (also Benedict Fogelberg), (1786–1854), Swedish sculptor
- Erland Harold Hedrick or E. H. Hedrick (1894–1954), American Democratic politician from West Virginia
- Erland Hellström (born 1980), Swedish football goalkeeper
- Erland Herkenrath (1912–2003), Swiss field handball player who competed in the 1936 Summer Olympics
- Erland Johnsen (born 1967), retired Norwegian footballer and current manager
- Erland Josephson (1923–2012), Swedish actor and author
- Erland Kiøsterud (born 1953), Norwegian novelist
- Erland Koch (German sport shooter) (1867–1945), German sports shooter who competed in the 1912 Summer Olympics
- Erland Koch (1913–1972) Swedish sports shooter
- Erland Kops (1937–2017), former badminton player from Denmark
- Erland Lee (1864–1926), Canadian farmer, teacher, government employee, founder of the Women's Institutes
- Erland Lindén (1880–1952), Swedish sailor who competed in the 1912 Summer Olympics
- Erland Nordenskiöld (1877–1932), Finnish-Swedish archeologist and anthropologist
- Erland Pison (born 1974), Belgian politician
- Erland Samuel Bring (1736–1798), Swedish mathematician
- Erland Steenberg (1919–2009), Norwegian politician for the Centre Party
- Erland Van Lidth De Jeude (1953–1987), Dutch-born actor, wrestler, opera singer and worked with computers
- Erland von Koch (1910–2009), Swedish composer
- Erling Erland (1917–1988), Norwegian politician and Member of Parliament for Anders Lange's Party
- Olof Erland (1944–2013), politician in the autonomous Åland Islands
- Rune Erland (born 1968), Norwegian handball player

== See also ==
- Erland and the Carnival, British folk rock band
- Erland Falls, 13-metre-high (43 ft) waterfall in Stoney Creek, Hamilton, Ontario, Canada
- Erland Lee Museum, National Historic Site of Canada located on the ridge of the Niagara Escarpment in Stoney Creek, Ontario
- Arland (disambiguation), Aurland, Årland
- Erlandson, Erlandsson, Erlang, Euroland
- Herland, Hærland
- Orland, Ørland
