= Herland =

Herland may refer to:

- Doug Herland (1951–1991), 1984 Olympic Bronze Medalist (Rowing)
- Herland (novel), 1915 utopian novel by Charlotte Perkins Gilman
- Hærland, a village in Eidsberg, Norway
- Anna Sofie Herland (1913–1990)
- Hanne Nabintu Herland (born 1966), Norwegian author and debater
- Hugh Herland (1330–1411), 14th-century medieval English carpenter
- Sigmund Herland (1865–1954)

== See also ==
- Erland
