= Erlandson =

Erlandson is a Swedish patronymic surname, meaning "son of Erland", and may refer to:

- Axel Erlandson (1884–1964), Swedish American horticulturist
- Erland Erlandson (c. 1790–1875), Dano-Canadian trader and explorer
- Eric Erlandson (born 1963), American songwriter and guitarist
- Mike Erlandson (born 1964), American corporate executive
- Tom Erlandson (linebacker, born 1940), NFL linebacker for the Denver Broncos, Miami Dolphins, San Diego Chargers, and Washington State University
- Tom Erlandson (linebacker, born 1966), NFL linebacker for the Buffalo Bills and Washington Huskies

== See also ==
- Erlandsson
