= Orland =

Orland or Ørland is the name, or part of the name, of a number of places and people:

== Places ==
=== Norway ===
- Ørland Municipality, a municipality in Trøndelag county
- Ørland Main Air Station, an air force station in Trøndelag county
- Ørland Airport, an airport in Ørland Municipality in Trøndelag county

=== United States ===
- Orland Township, a list of places named "Orland Township"
- Orland, California, a city in Glenn County, California
  - Orland station, a railway station in Orland, California
  - Orland High School, a high school in Orland, California
  - Orland Buttes, two buttes near Orland, California
- Orland, Georgia, an unincorporated community in Treutlen County, Georgia
- Orland, Indiana, a town in Steuben County, Indiana
- Orland, Maine, a town in Hancock County, Maine
  - Orland River, a river near Orland, Maine
- Orland, Ohio, an unincorporated community in Swan Township, Vinton County, Ohio
- Orland, South Dakota, a town in South Dakota
- Orland Hills, Illinois, a village in Cook County, Illinois
- Orland Park, Illinois, a village in Cook County, Illinois
  - Orland Park Place, a shopping center in Orland Park, Illinois
  - Orland Square Mall, a shopping center in Orland Park, Illinois

== People ==
- Yehu Orland (born 1981), Israeli basketball player and coach
- Orland Lindsay, an Antiguan Anglican clergyman
- Orland Steen Loomis, an American lawyer and progressive politician from Juneau County, Wisconsin

== Other ==
- Ørland BK, a sports club based in Ørland Municipality in Trøndelag county
- Ørland Radio, a coast radio station based in Ørland Municipality in Trøndelag county
