= Erlandsson =

Erlandsson is a Swedish surname. Notable people with the surname include:

- Adrian Erlandsson (born 1970), prolific Swedish death metal and black metal drummer
- Daniel Erlandsson (born 1976), Swedish drummer in the melodic death metal band Arch Enemy
- Eskil Erlandsson (born 1957), Swedish politician and member of the Centre Party
- Ingemar Erlandsson (1957–2022), former Swedish footballer
- Martin Erlandsson (born 1974), Swedish professional golfer
- Tim Erlandsson (born 1996), Swedish footballer
- Viveka Erlandsson, Swedish mathematician

== See also ==
- Erlandson
- Erlendsson
