= Erland Pison =

Belgian politician (born 1974)

- Born: 4 October 1974 (age 51); Schoten, Belgium
- Occupations: Politician, lawyer

Erland Pison (born 4 October 1974) is a Belgian politician.

After completing his law studies at the Katholieke Universiteit Leuven, Pison moved to Brussels in 1999 to start his legal career in public law. From 2004 to 2009 he served in the Brussels Parliament. In November 2004, Pison ran for the presidency of Flemish political party Vlaams Belang but was not elected. From 2006 to 2009 he was also elected municipal councilor of Koekelberg. In 2010 he left politics and the bar of Brussels to study international relations. Pison re-entered politics in 2019. From 2019 until his dismissal in 2022, he was accredited parliamentary assistant (APA) at the European Parliament. Pison was criticized in 2024 for a 2009 tour of the Flemish Parliament he gave to Russian far-right figure Roman Zentsov and for calling Russia an "ally in the common struggle against the Islamic threat to Europe".
