= Orland Township =

Orland Township may refer to:

- Orland Township, Cook County, Illinois
- Orland Township, Lake County, South Dakota, in Lake County, South Dakota
