= Erlendsson =

Erlendsson is a surname. Notable people with the surname include:

- Eysteinn Erlendsson (died 1188), Archbishop of Nidaros from 1161 to his death
- Guðmundur Erlendsson (c. 1595–1670), Icelandic poet and clergyman
- Haukr Erlendsson (died 1334), the writer of the Hauksbók
- Magnus Erlendsson, Earl of Orkney, the first Earl of Orkney to bear that name, ruled from 1108 to c. 1115
