= Ozay Mehmet =

Cypriot-Canadian academic (1938–2023)

Ozay Mehmet (November 15, 1938 – November 13, 2023) was a Cypriot-Canadian professor emeritus of international affairs at Carleton University in Ottawa, Ontario.

== Biography ==
Mehmet was born on November 15, 1938, in Nicosia, Cyprus, into a Turkish Cypriot family. He studied at the London School of Economics between 1959 and 1962. Subsequently, he received his MA and PhD in economics from the University of Toronto on a Canadian Commonwealth Scholarship. He taught at various Canadian universities, including the University of Windsor, York University, the University of Toronto, the University of Ottawa, and Carleton University.

Mehmet was a specialist in economic development, with special reference to Asian Tigers, Turkey, and Cyprus. He consulted extensively for the WB, ADB, CIDA, CFTC, and UN agencies (ILO, WHO, UNDP). He authored 21 academic books and over 100 articles in top academic journals. In retirement, he wrote historical novels.

Mehmet was married and had three sons; He resided in Ottawa with his wife Karen. He died on November 13, 2023, at the age of 84.

== Publications ==
=== Academic books ===
- Mehmet, Ozay (1978), Economic Planning and Social Justice in Developing Countries, Taylor & Francis, ISBN 0856645524.
- Mehmet, Ozay (1986), Development in Malaysia: Poverty, Wealth, and Trusteeship, Routledge, ISBN 0709935250.
- Mehmet, Ozay (1991), Islamic Identity and Development: Studies of the Islamic Periphery, Routledge, ISBN 0415043867.
- Mehmet, Ozay (1999), Westernizing the Third World: The Eurocentricity of Economic Development Theories, Routledge, ISBN 0415205743.
- Mehmet, Ozay (2009), Sustainability of Microstates: The Case of North Cyprus, University of Utah Press, ISBN 978-0874809831.

https://turkishcanadians.com/

=== Historical novels ===
- Mehmet, Ozay (2011), Uzun Ali: Shame and Salvation, Wisdom House Publications, ISBN 978-1842902363.
