= Benkovski, Kardzhali Province =

Benkovski Бенковски
- Village
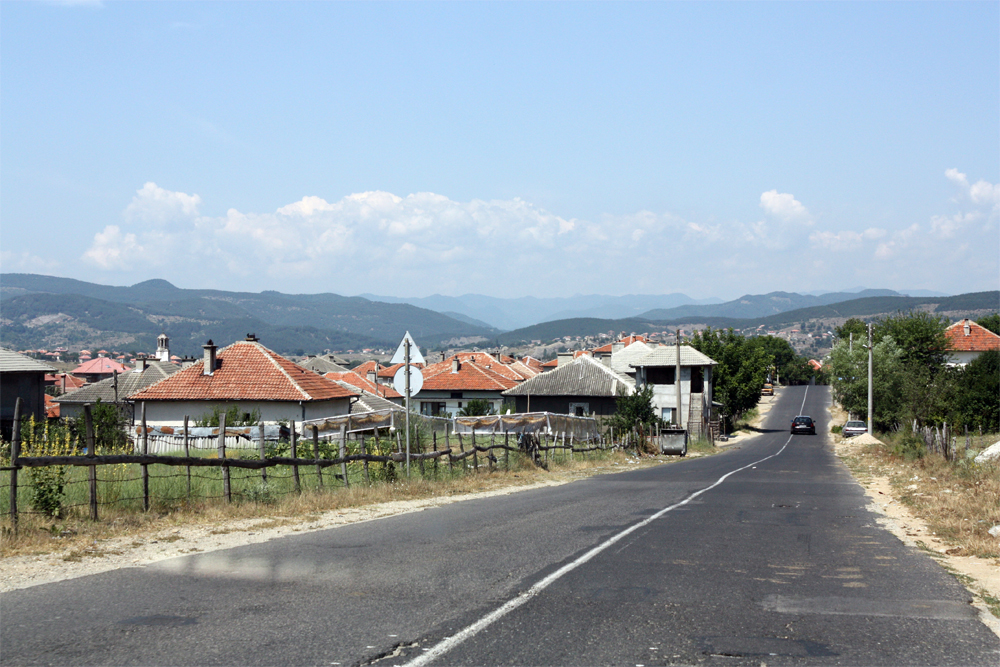
- Entrance to Benkovski village through the road Dzhebel-Zlatograd

- Location within Bulgaria
- Coordinates: 41.3833°N 25.2667°E
- Country: Bulgaria
- Province: Kardzhali Province
- Municipality: Kirkovo

Population (2021)
  - Total: 2,321
- Time zone: UTC+2 (EET)
  - Summer (DST): UTC+3 (EEST)

Benkovski is a village in Kirkovo Municipality, Kardzhali Province, southern Bulgaria.
