= Erland Erlandson =

- Born: c. 1790; Copenhagen, Denmark
- Died: 23 January 1875 (aged 84–85); Port Hope, Ontario, Canada
- Occupations: Carpenter, fur trapper & trader
- Known for: 1st crossing of the Labrador Peninsula; 1st sighting of Churchill Falls

Erland Erlandson (c. 1790 – 1875) was a Danish carpenter and sailor who, after becoming a British prisoner of war during the Napoleonic Wars, joined the Hudson's Bay Company in British North America. Despite his poor English, his intelligence and hard work saw him promoted from carpenter to clerk to factor. Along with Nicol Finlayson, he crossed northern Quebec to establish the HBC's Ungava District, an ordeal fictionalized in R. M. Ballantyne's 1857 adventure novel Ungava. In 1834, misled by his Indigenous guides, he became the first known European to cross the Labrador Peninsula. He also established several outposts in the interior, including the successful Fort Nascopie, but, effectively barred from further promotion owing to his low and foreign birth, he eventually retired to a homestead in Canada West (present-day Ontario). Having never married, his large estate—usually credited by Canadian historians to two bank thefts—was mostly left to the Toronto General Hospital.

== Life ==
=== Early life ===
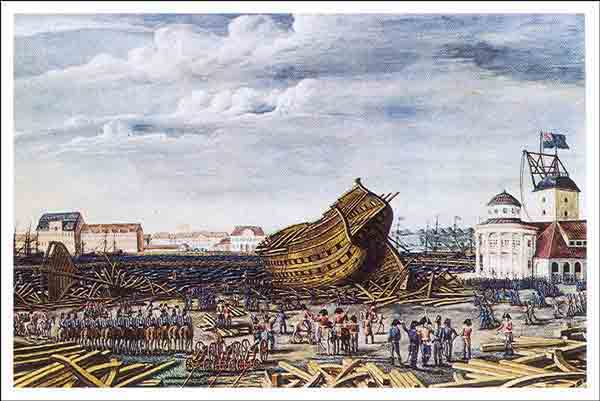
C.W. Eckersberg's 1807 The British Destruction of the Danish Ships under Construction at Holmen

Erlandson was born around 1790 in Copenhagen, Denmark. He and his father worked as carpenters in the Copenhagen dockyards, which—despite Denmark's nominal neutrality—were preëmptively attacked by the United Kingdom during the Second Battle of Copenhagen in 1807, the onset of the Gunboat and Anglo-Russian Wars. In December 1813, amid the War of the Sixth Coalition, Erlandson was captured by the Royal Navy at age 23 while working as a sailor in the Kattegat. He was held in a prison ship in Chatham, Kent. Hostilities between Britain and Denmark ended the next year, and the Hudson's Bay Company hired Erlandson and other Scandinavians to work in northern and western Canada.

=== With the Hudson's Bay Company ===
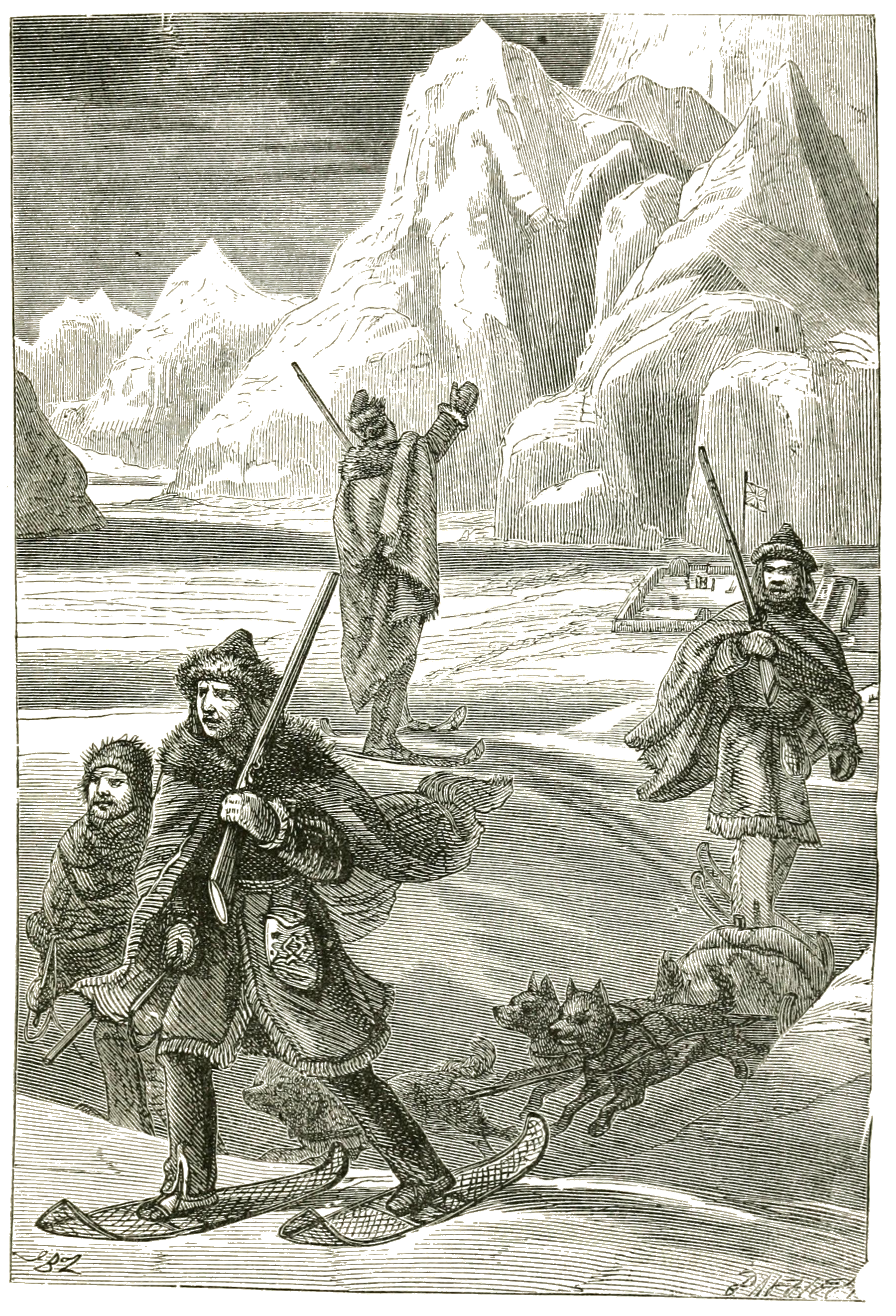
An illustration of the HBC men from Ungava, Ballantyne's fictionalized portrayal of life at Fort Chimo

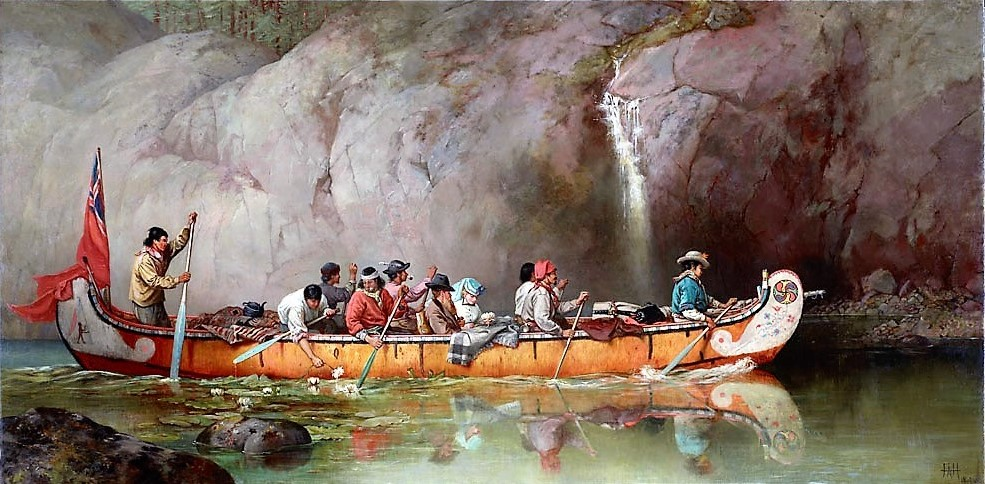
F. A. Hopkins's portrayal of an HBC freight canoe (1869)

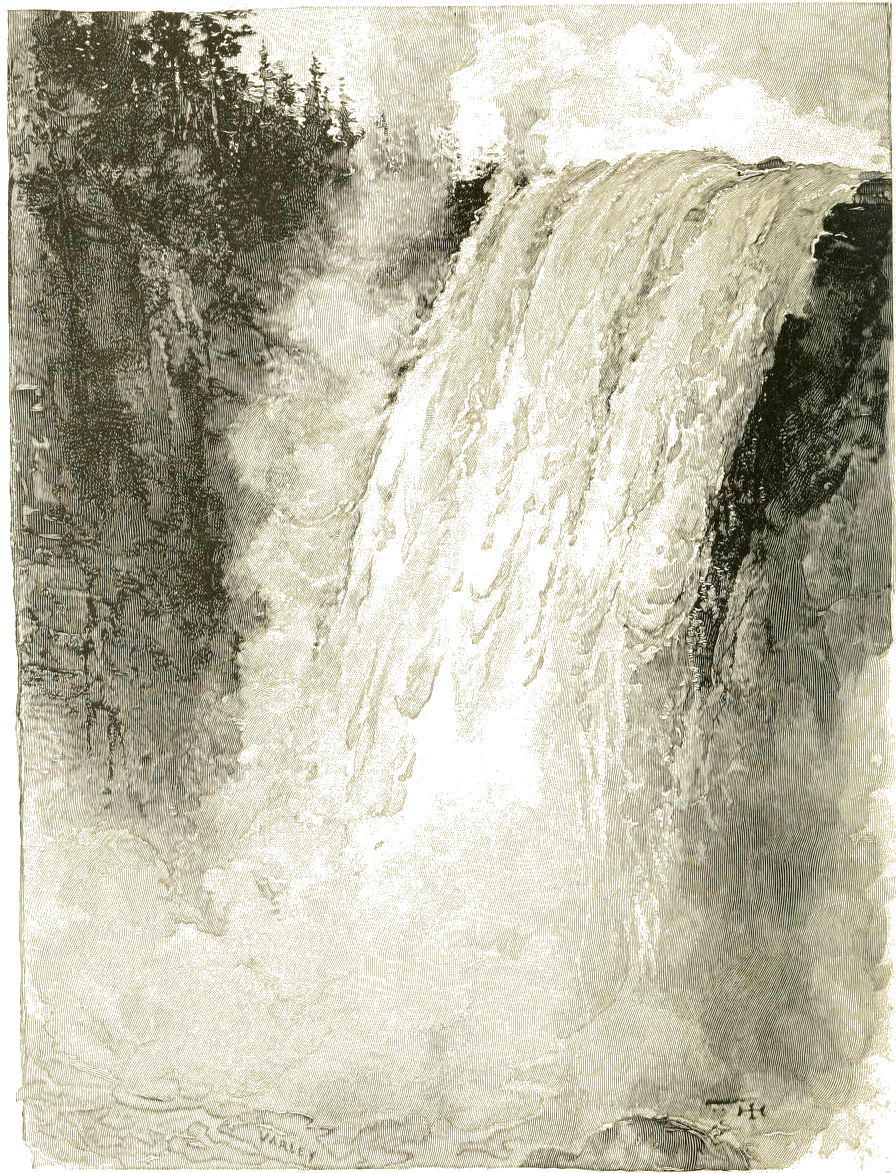
An engraving of Churchill Falls, c. 1890

In adulthood, Erlandson was a stout, pale man 1.765 m (5 ft 9.5 in) tall with light brown hair and hazel eyes. His first post was the East Main House on what is now known as the Eastmain River; at the time, it supervised most of HBC's operations on the eastern shore of Hudson Bay. His English was poor, but his supervisors considered him "an excellent servant... strictly honest, sober, and active, and very intelligent" and promoted him quickly. He was made foreman of the carpenters at the headquarters of the Moose Factory District in 1817. He became a clerk in 1819 and factor of East Main House in 1822.

In 1830, he served under factor Nicol Finlayson in the establishment of the new Ungava District, a mission fictionalized in R. M. Ballantyne's 1857 adventure novel Ungava. They passed from Richmond Gulf to the South River (the present-day Koksoak), where they built Fort Good Hope (soon renamed Fort Chimo and now known as Kuujjuaq, Quebec) 43 km (27 mi) upstream from its mouth. Finlayson and Erlandson quickly discovered the rosy portrayal of the area in the journals of the Moravian missionaries Kohlmeister and Kmoch had been wildly inaccurate or become outdated. One of the brigs charged with supplying them failed to make it through, and they became aware of the poor prospect of resupplying the fort during winter by hunting, foraging, or fishing. With the Inuit to the north and hostile southern natives treating the area as an insecure no-man's land, they received few furs; the Inuit were further completely uninterested trading for British clothes in place of their own native sealskins and deerskins. Finlayson sent Erlandson overland in February 1831 with reports and letters for Governor George Simpson; Erlandson lost these when his canoe capsized on the Michipicoten but he continued and conveyed their message to Gov. Simpson in person at York Factory. He returned to Fort Chimo on the sloop Beaver, reaching it in September.

In 1832, Erlandson traveled about 210 km (130 mi) up the Koksoak and its tributary the Kaniapiskau to erect a trading post at South River House. The living was hardly better and he discovered that the little trade he received came at the expense of Fort Chimo's; he abandoned it the next year and returned to Finlayson.

By 1834, the two had decided that inland posts would need to be placed in the highlands to the southeast and that an overland supply route would need to be established with HBC's posts on the St Lawrence River. On 6 April 1834, Finlayson dispatched Erlandson and five Innu guides in an attempt to reach Mingan. They followed the Whale River to Lakes Petitsikapau and Michikamau, at which point Erlandson found his guides—whose repeated bouts of snowblindness had exasperated him to no end—had decided to travel east to the Atlantic rather than south as ordered. Passing through a series of small lakes to the Naskaupi and Grand Lake, they reached Goose Bay—the deepest inlet of Esquimaux Bay (now Groswater Bay)—on 22 June, making Erlandson the first European known to have crossed the Labrador Peninsula from the Hudson Strait to the Atlantic Coast. (Note: Credit for this accomplishment is sometimes mistakenly given to Finlayson's successor John McLean.) Erlandson found a rival company operating there and returned north on a longer but lower route further to the west, passing Lakes Wakuach and Chakonipau and following the Swampy Bay River and Kaniapiskau to the Koksoak; he reached Fort Chimo on 17 July. Erlandson's reports on the good hunting in the still-uncharted Labrador highlands led Gov. Simpson to attempt to salvage the losses at Ungava by directing it to construct interior posts which could be supplied from Quebec via Groswater Bay.

Erlandson controlled Fort Chimo as acting factor between Finlayson departing in 1836 and John McLean arriving the next year. Gov. Simpson sympathized with Erlandson's ability and disappointment at his continued demotion, but understood that the voting officers of the company refused to elect "a foreigner... raised from the ranks" to the status of chief trader.

Despite failing health, on 18 June 1838, Erlandson led a team of nine HBC servants and two Innu guides south along the Koksoak, Kaniapiskau, and Swampy Bay Rivers to erect Fort Nascopie on Lake Petitsikapau. Most returned north along the George but Erlandson and two others stayed at the new post over the winter. The next year, when McLean arrived in an attempt to improve on the route discovered by Erlandson in 1834, Erlandson left with him and was part of the team that found Grand Falls (now Churchill Falls) on the Grand River (now the Churchill). Returning, he spent the winter at Fort Trial on the George before leaving Ungava in 1840. (The year after he left, McLean used HBC reports and further information from local guides to find a practical riverine route up the George, across a series of small lakes, and down the Naskaupi to Groswater Bay. Further exploration from Fort Smith eventually showed that the route sought by Finlayson and Erlandson leading directly from Ungava Bay to the St Lawrence was completely impracticable, the forests further south than Groswater Bay being too boggy for travel and their lakes too shallow for the large trading canoes used by the HBC.)

He was assigned to the Lake Superior District in 1841, where he headed the Long Lake post until 1843 and the Pic post until 1848. Both were dead-end positions; with no hope for promotion, he retired in 1848.

=== Later life ===
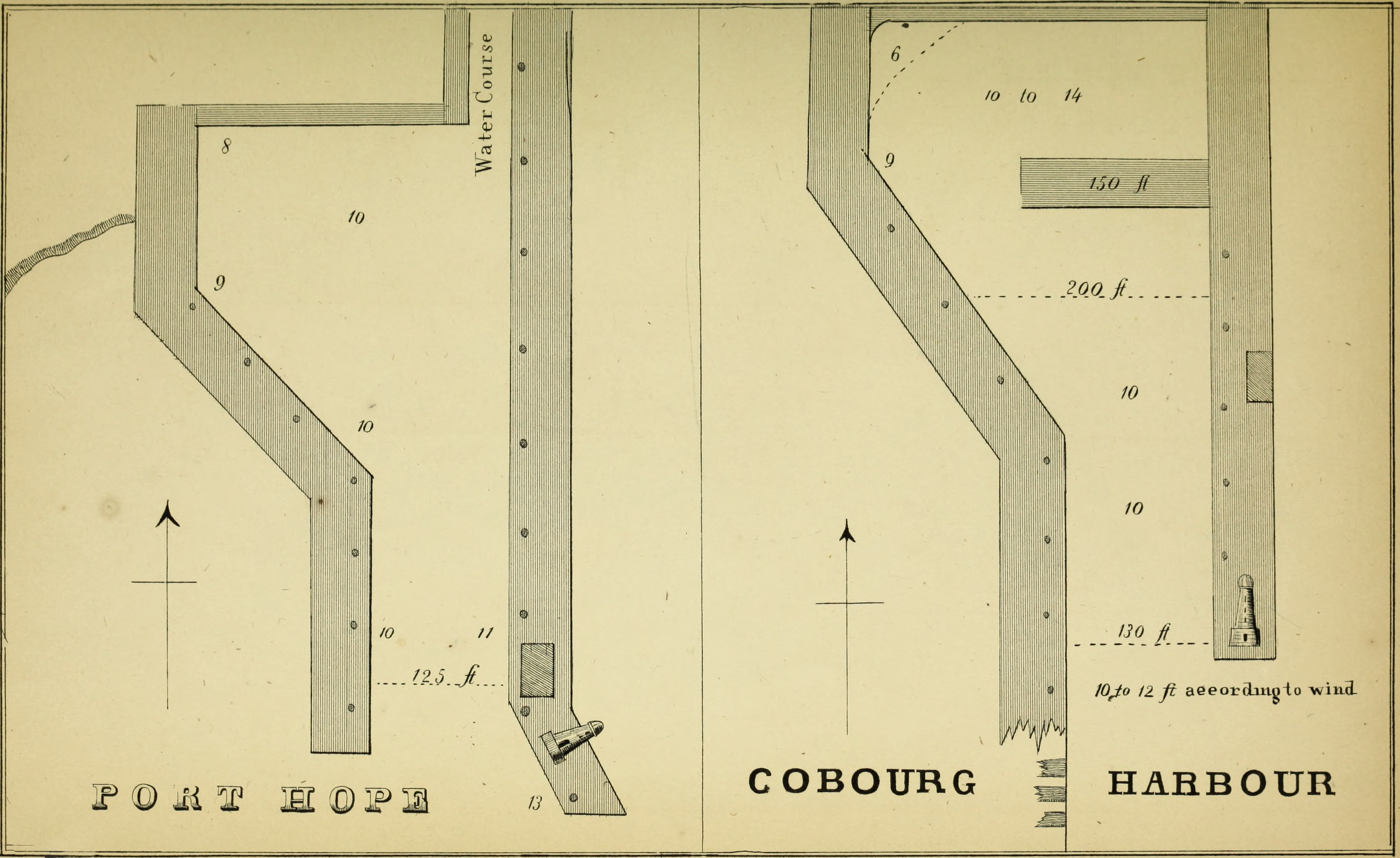
A sketch map of Port Hope's harbour in 1857

Still single, he got a home in Port Hope, Canada West (now Ontario), near the homestead and store operated by George Gladman, a retired chief trader who had been Erlandson's colleague at East Main and Moose Factory. In 1853 and 1854, he traveled to London and Denmark before returning to Canada to work with his former factor John McLean. McLean had opened a branch of the Bank of Montreal in Guelph, Canada West, and employed Erlandson as a clerk. During his visit, a total of £1300 was stolen in two incidents. McLean defended his friend against his wife's suspicions and nearly bankrupted himself repaying the amount himself.

Erlandson returned to Port Hope, where he died on 23 January 1875. Leaving an estate of C$14,000 (most of it donated to the Toronto General Hospital although they found it expedient to settle a probate dispute with "the Misses Olsen of Copenhagen" for £100), Erlandson has subsequently been suspected of the theft at McLean's bank, although others allow that it may have come from transactions during his European trip.
