= Puckle gun =

Crew-served, manually operated percussion cap revolver

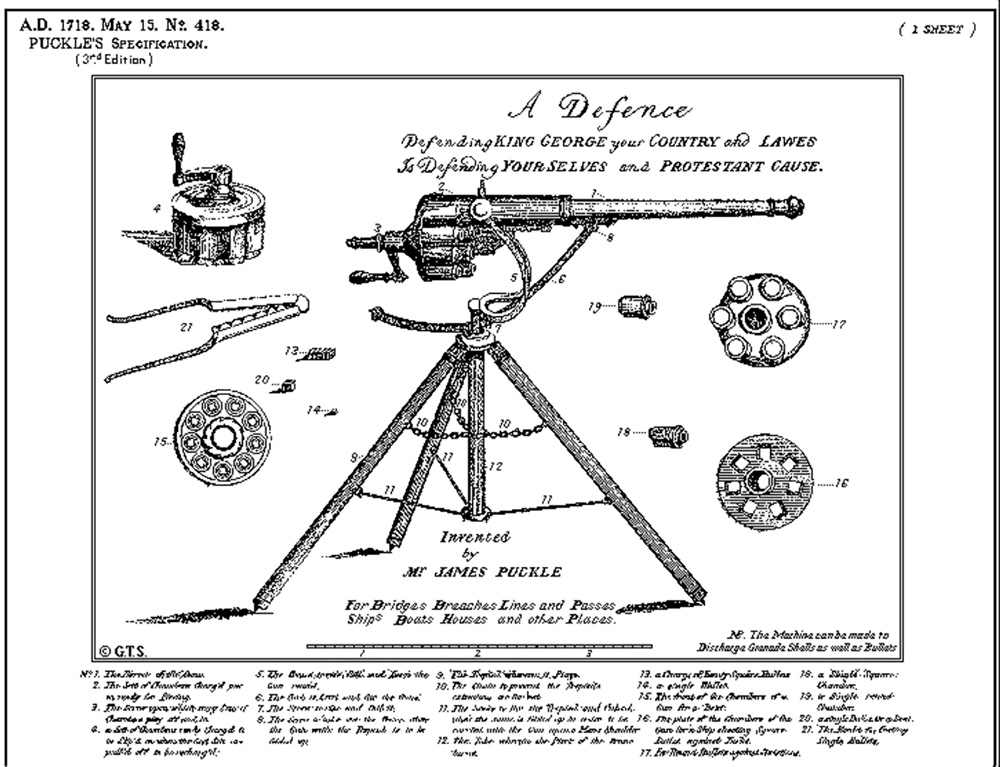
Patent No. 418, for James Puckle's 1718 revolving firearm, showing various cylinders for use with round and square bullets.

The Puckle gun (also known as the defence gun) was a primitive crew-served, manually operated flintlock revolver patented in 1718 by James Puckle (1667–1724), a British inventor, lawyer and writer. It was one of the earliest weapons to be referred to as a "machine gun", being called such in a 1722 shipping manifest, though its operation does not match the modern use of the term. It was never used during any combat operation or war. Production was highly limited and may have been as few as two guns.

== Design and patent ==
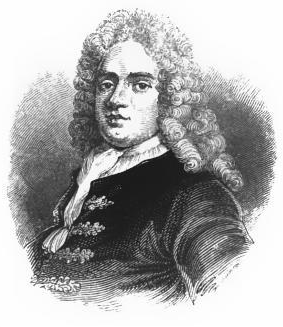
James Puckle (1667–1724), English inventor, lawyer and writer, patented the Puckle gun in 1718.

The Puckle gun is a tripod-mounted, single-barreled flintlock weapon fitted with a manually operated revolving cylinder; Puckle advertised its main application as an anti-boarding gun for use on ships. The barrel was 3 feet (0.91 m) long with a bore of 1.25 inches (32 mm). The cylinder held 6 to 11 shots depending on configuration, and was hand-loaded with powder and shot while detached from the weapon. (Note: Willbanks states 9, Puckle's patent depicting 9, 7 and 6 round cylinders)

According to the Patent Office of the United Kingdom, "In the reign of Queen Anne, the law officers of the Crown established as a condition of grant that 'the patentee must by an instrument in writing describe and ascertain the nature of the invention and the manner in which it is to be performed.'" This gun's patent, number 418 of 1718, was one of the first to provide such a description. T. W. Lee remarked, however, that "James Puckle's patent in 1718 contains more rhetorical fervor than technical rigor."

=== Two versions ===
Puckle demonstrated two configurations of the basic design: the first, intended for use against Christian enemies, fired conventional round bullets, while the second, intended for use against the Muslim Turks, fired unconventional square bullets. The square bullets were considered to be more painful and would cause greater severe wounding. They would, according to the patent, "convince the Turks of the benefits of Christian civilization". The weapon was also reported as able to fire shot, with each discharge containing sixteen musket balls.

== Operation ==
The Puckle gun firing mechanism is similar to a conventional flintlock musket. After each shot, a crank on the rear of the threaded shaft that runs through the cylinder is turned, allowing the cylinder to be rotated by hand to the next chamber. Rotating the cylinder causes a slot-and-stud mechanism to close the firing pan on the previous chamber and open the next ready to be primed. The crank is then screwed tight again, locking the tapered end of the chamber into the barrel to form a gas-tight seal. The flintlock mechanism is then primed and the weapon fired by operating a long trigger lever which extended down to about the level of the operator's waist.

To reload, the crank handle can be unscrewed completely to detach the cylinder, which can then be replaced with a fresh one. In this way it is similar to earlier breech-loading swivel guns with a detachable chamber which could be loaded prior to use. The cylinder appears to have been referred to as a "charger" in contemporary documentation.

All known examples of Puckle guns have a folding tripod mount. The gun is balanced well on the tripod and can be elevated and traversed by the operator to aim it.

== Production and use ==
A prototype was shown in 1717 to Great Britain's Board of Ordnance, who were not impressed. At a later public trial held in 1722, a Puckle gun was able to fire 63 shots in seven minutes (approximately nine rounds per minute) in the midst of a driving rain storm. A rate of nine rounds per minute compared favourably to musketeers of the period, who could be expected to fire between two and five rounds per minute depending on the quality of the troops, with experienced troops expected to reliably manage three rounds a minute under fair conditions; it was, however, inferior in fire rate to earlier repeating weapons such as the Kalthoff repeater, which fired up to six times faster.

The Puckle gun drew few investors and never achieved mass production or sales to the British armed forces. As with other designs of the time it was hampered by "clumsy and undependable flintlock ignition" and other mechanical problems. A leaflet of the period sarcastically observed of the venture that "they're only wounded who hold shares therein". Production was highly limited and may have been as few as just two guns, one a crude prototype made of iron, the other a finished weapon made from brass. (Note: Wilcock states a third example exists at the Tøjhusmuseet (Royal Danish Arsenal) in Copenhagen.)

John Montagu, 2nd Duke of Montagu, Master-General of the Ordnance during 1740–1749, purchased two guns for an unsuccessful expedition in 1722 to capture St Lucia and St Vincent. While shipping manifests state "2 Machine Guns of Puckles" (sic) were among the cargo that departed from Portsmouth, there is no evidence that the guns were ever used in battle.

== Surviving examples ==
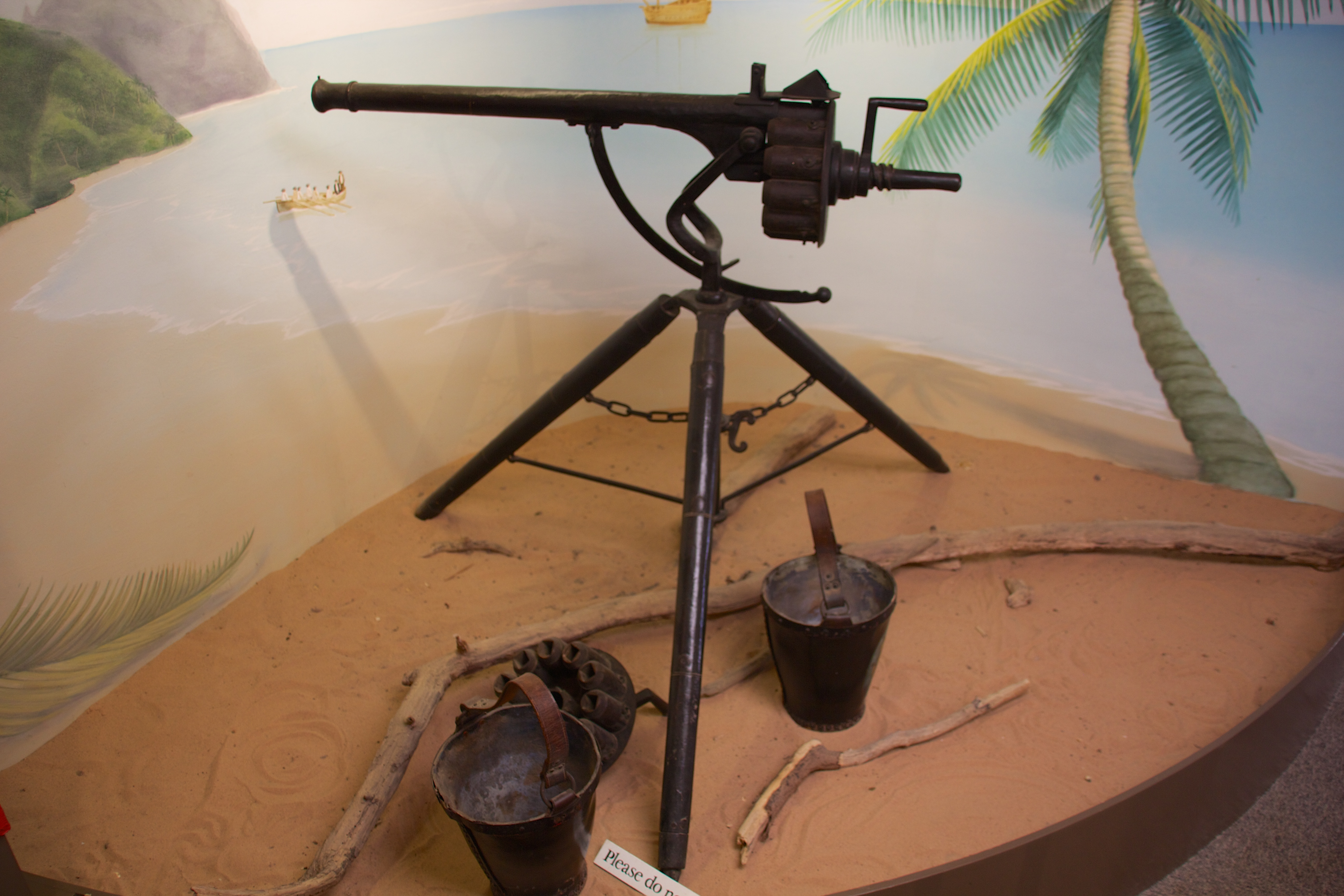
Replica Puckle gun from Buckler's Hard Maritime Museum.

Two original examples are on display at former Montagu homes: one at Boughton House and another at Beaulieu Palace House. There is a replica of a Puckle gun at Buckler's Hard Maritime Museum in Hampshire. Blackmore's British Military Firearms 1650–1850 lists "Puckle's brass gun in the Tower of London" as illustration 77, though this appears to have been a gun belonging to the former Montagu estate (at that point owned by the Buccleuch family) on loan to the Tower at the time.

There is another example from China's Palace Museum in the Forbidden City in Beijing. According to the official record, it was among the three Puckle guns that were given as gift to the emperor in 1804. The Chinese named them lunzipao (轮子炮), meaning "wheel gun". The curators did not know its true origin, and mistook the flintlock as the sight, and that the gun was fired by a lit match.

One example of brass Puckle gun was apparently bought by Tsar Pyotr I and delivered to Russia in 1718. Currently it resides in the collection of the Military History Museum of Artillery, Engineers and Signal Corps in Saint Petersburg.

== Similar guns ==
=== Collier revolver ===
Elisha Collier invented a flintlock revolver in 1818, nearly a hundred years after the Puckle gun (though examples of flintlock and matchlock revolvers exist much earlier, with the earliest known dating back to the 15th century). Unlike the Puckle, the cylinder of the Collier was not interchangeable, slowing reloading, but would have had a faster rate of fire for its five chambers due to the integral cylinder advancing of its single-action revolver mechanism, self-priming mechanism, and the lack of a need to screw and unscrew the cylinder between shots.

=== Remington-pattern revolvers ===
During the period between the widespread adoption of the revolver, but prior to widespread use of cartridges, a common method of increasing reload speed was to replace a revolver's entire cylinder with another pre-loaded one, similar to the Puckle gun. This practice was primarily done on Remington revolvers, as their cylinders were easily removable and were held by a cylinder pin, unlike the early Colt revolvers which were held together by wedges that went through the cylinder pins.

=== Confederate revolving cannon ===
A single example of a two-inch-bore, five-shot revolver cannon was built and used by the Confederate States of America during the Siege of Petersburg. It was captured on 27 April 1865 by Union troops and sent for examination to the United States Military Academy at West Point, New York.

== In popular culture ==
In the 2014 video game Assassin's Creed: Rogue, protagonist Shay Cormac has a total of four Puckle guns equipped on his ship, which replace the swivel guns used in Assassin's Creed IV: Black Flag. However, these Puckle guns possess a comparatively high fire rate of around 120 RPM, in stark contrast to their historical inspiration. The player can upgrade the ship's Puckle guns over the course of the game to be more powerful and have larger breech cylinders to hold more ammunition.

In the 2009 video game Empire: Total War, players can use Puckle guns during real-time battles, among other types of foot artillery, after researching certain technologies.
