= Lake Wakuach =

Lake in Quebec, Canada

- Location within Quebec
- Location: Rivière-Koksoak, Kativik, Quebec
- Coordinates: 55°33′46″N 67°32′35″W
- Basin countries: Canada

Lake Wakuach (Lac Wakuach) is a lake in northern Quebec, Canada.
