= Hanne Nabintu Herland =

Norwegian author (born 1966)

Hanne Stine Nabintu Herland
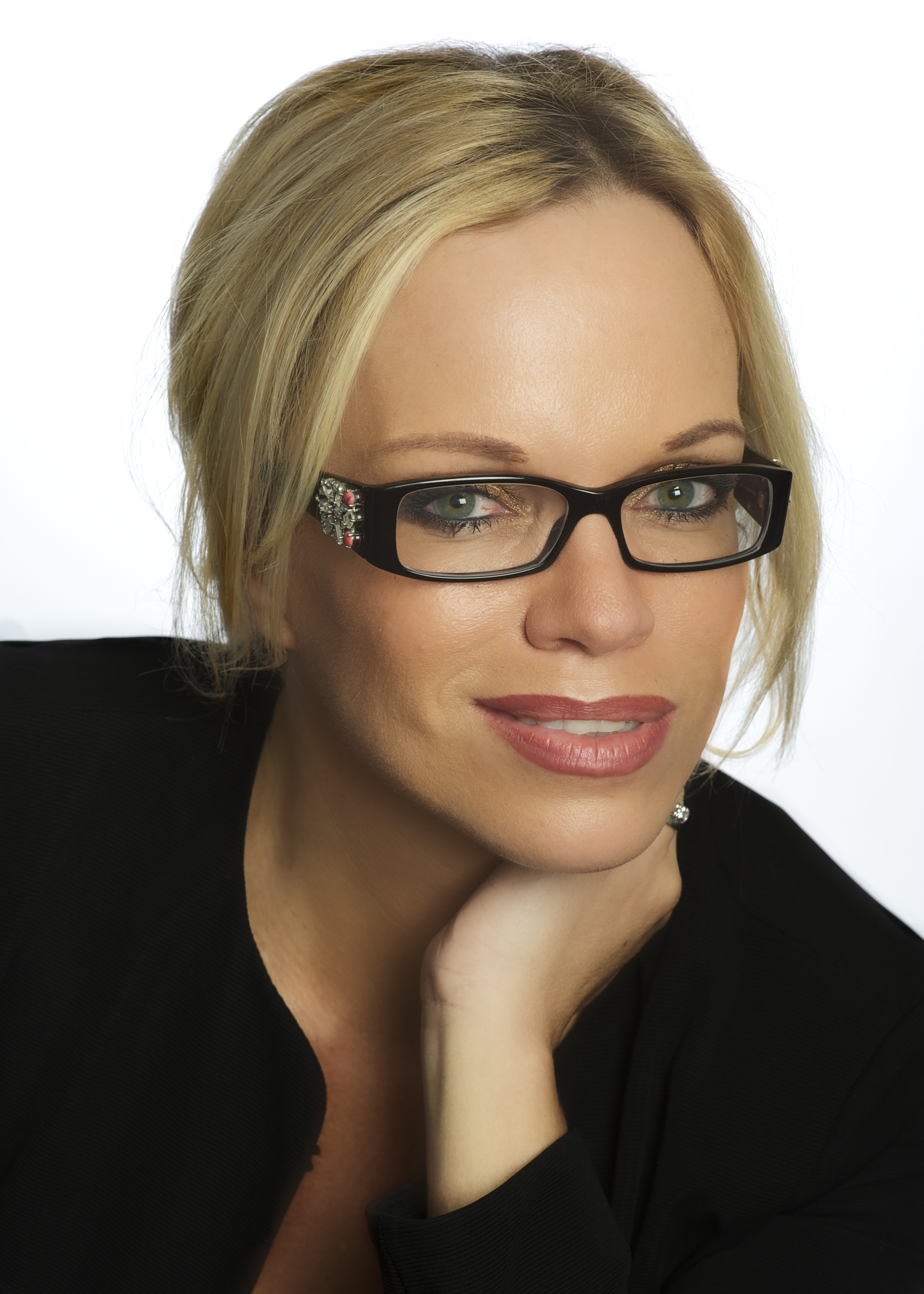
- Photo by Paul Bernhard
- Born: Kivu, Congo
- Citizenship: Norwegian
- Education: MA in history of religions
- Partner: Married
- Website: https://www.hannenabintuherland.no/

Hanne Stine Nabintu Herland (born 1966) is a Norwegian author, who hosts a website and Youtube channel both named the Herland Report. She has a master's degree in history of religions from the University of Oslo.

Herland identifies with social conservatism and states that she opposes political correctness. Among Herland's books are Alarm! Tanker om en kultur i krise (2010), Respekt (2012), The Culture War. How the West lost its greatness (2017), Det nye Babylon (2018) and New Left Tyranny. The Authoritarian destruction of our way of life (2020) and The Billionare World. How Marxism Serves the Elite (2023). She was editor of Ny vind over Norge together with the previous Prime Minister of Norway Erna Solberg and others from the "right" side of Norwegian politics. Herland has appeared as a pundit on Russia Today, criticizing alleged Western hypocrisy in connection with the wars in the middle east. Her writings have been recommended among others by the Russian embassy in Norway. Regular guests on the Herland Report include US Republicans as Senator Richard Black, Senator Ron Paul.

== Early life ==
Herland was born in the Democratic Republic of Congo. Her parents moved to Africa in the 1960s to work for UNESCO. Her middle name Nabintu is most common in DR Congo. She spent her childhood in the Congo, Kenya and Rwanda. At the age of 19 she moved to Norway. Herland obtained an MA in the history of religions at the University of Oslo in 2005, writing her master's thesis on the Kenyan Qadi court.

== Public debate ==
Herland has been an active and controversial public commentator and writer in Norway since the mid 2000s, voicing opposition against feminism, "globalism," and what she claims is a "liberal breaking up of traditional values."

In 2007, she wrote the op-ed "Western women's defeat," in which she wrote that it is not strange that Africans rape women when they come to Norway and experience how worthless a woman's sexuality is in Western culture, where women are sexual objects according to Herland. Herland concludes: "In a country that is increasingly characterized by a deterioration of traditional values, the woman sits drunk and alone in bars at night in miniskirts – and thinks she's free."

In the 2007 op-ed "Rasismen mot hvite," Herland claimed that the predominant form of racism in today's Norway is "the racism against white people." In 2009, she criticized feminism and said it had created many harsh Norwegian women, and that she understood men who preferred Russian and Thai brides.

In 2010 the Christian organisation Digni removed a presentation by Herland from their website after facing criticism. A remix of the presentation, titled "Skal vi danse, Nabintu?", went viral in Norway.

In 2011, Herland claimed that Norway is the West's most antisemitic country, as even the state level is involved in a gross bias against Middle Eastern opinions. She said that anti-Israelism is the new face of antisemitism in Europe. She has for long addressed the problems of Middle Eastern Christians.

Since the outbreak of the Arab Spring, Herland has warned extensively against the Western naive belief that the Arab Spring would lead to Western democracy in the Middle East. She has said the Arab Spring could become an Arab Winter. In March, 2011, she held a speech at the Oslo Symposium conference organised by various Christian right organisations, warning that chaos might be the result in Egypt after the fall of Hosni Mubarak. She has been sharply critical of US's involvement in the Middle East.

In 2014, she was featured by RT in Worlds Apart. The Russian embassy in Norway has recommended Herland's blog as a source of information about Russia.

In 2017 Nabintu Herland claimed in an interview with the Norwegian newspaper Dagen that Russia's president Vladimir Putin is the greatest leader of our time.

In 2018 Herland interviewed alt-right figure Milo Yiannopoulos. She has also interviewed among others Bishop Harry Jackson, Dr. Paul Craig Roberts, Dr. Ron Paul, Kirbyjon Caldwell, Mohammad Usman Rana and Reginald Davis.

In 2015 she produced a series called Jerusalem for the conservative Christian niche channel TV Visjon Norge, about conservative Israelis' view on the region. It was described by Dagbladet as giving a voice to the extreme right in Israel while not interviewing any Palestinians or moderate Israelis. The TV Series Jerusalem also aired at CBN in USA.

The Norwegian Centre Against Racism wrote in a report on far-right extremism that Herland has expressed support for the Norwegian Defence League.

== Books ==
As a contributor to the book Ny sjanse (English: New chance), published in 2006 by the Conservative Party with Per Kristian Foss as editor, Herland argued that the Norwegian welfare state discouraged immigrants to seek work and made many too dependent on welfare benefits.

Herland's book Alarm! Reflections on a culture in crisis was published in 2010. In the book, she criticized what she called "the leftist radicals" and argued that Europeans are about to commit cultural suicide. Her work was called a fresh contribution to Christian conservative thought by Knut Hoem. The book was criticized as a poorly written collection of extended op-eds with many factual errors by liberal critic Øyvind Strømmen.

In the autobiography Respect, published in 2012, Herland discusses what she claims is "the socialist racism against whites and denigrating view of non-Western immigrants," Norwegian mediocrity and lack of respect for traditional Norwegian culture and on an international level, the lack of respect for sovereign states. She claims that "criminal immigrants" are "uncivilized" and focus on the importance of supporting law abiding immigrants. The last part of the book discusses The Arab Spring and the Libya war. She claims Norway is in a state of "civil war" since the generation of 1968 "destroyed" culture and society, and that Norwegians are currently living in a "constant state of war." She also writes about her cultural shock upon moving to Norway as an adult after growing up in Africa. The book was described by debate editor in Aftenposten Knut Olav Åmås as "a shockingly bad debate book" and its style as "characterizing and generalizing more than argumentative, often with thin or no supporting evidence." Dagbladet commentator Inger Merete Hobbelstad criticized the extent of the media coverage of Herland and the quality of Herland's contributions to public discourse, noting that "the arguments in her op-ed articles are weak, characterized by a striking absence of documentation and examples".

In 2013, Herland was editor of the political debate book Ny vind over Norge (English: New wind in Norway) which had 15 contributors including Erna Solberg, Siv Jensen, Torbjørn Røe Isaksen, Lars Roar Langslet, Asle Toje and Walid al-Kubaisi. The book was published in June, prior to the Norwegian parliamentary election in September 2013. Aftenposten editor Knut Olav Åmås called the book "Fresh new thoughts from the Right that sum up the ideological debate the past years." Dagbladet critic Jon Berglien described the book as "at the very best a gentle breeze" and argued that the book was "full of empty slogans" and that "some voices wondered about which company the different participants were in."

She wrote the foreword in the Norwegian painter Odd Nedrum's 2013 book Crime and Refuge.

Herland has since published internationally The Culture War: How the West Lost its Greatness (2017), New Left Tyranny (2020), Trump: The Battle for America (2020) and The Billionaire World: How Marxism Serves the Elite (2023).

== Bibliography ==
- Kristiansen, Hanne Stine Nabintu; Lys over landsbyen, Filadelfiaforlaget (1980) ISBN 82-534-0508-1
- Kristiansen, Hanne Stine Nabintu; Det siste våpenet – Tenår-ringen, Filadelfiaforlaget (1985) ISBN 82-534-0684-3
- Herland, Hanne Stine Nabintu: The task of reviving islam: Qadi-domstolens betydning for islamiseringen i Kenya Universitetet i Oslo (2005)
- Herland, Hanne Stine Nabintu; Alarm! Tanker om en kultur i krise, Luther forlag (2010) ISBN 978-82-531-4611-9
- Herland, Hanne Nabintu; Respekt. Orfeus publishing (2012). ISBN 978-82-93140-07-8
- Herland, Hanne Stine Nabintu (editor); Ny vind over Norge, Dreyers Forlag (2013) ISBN 9788282650847
- Herland, Hanne Nabintu; THE CULTURE WAR: How the West Lost Its Greatness & Was Weakened From Within . Christian Publishing House (2017). ISBN 1945757639 ISBN 978-1945757631
- Herland, Hanne Nabintu; Det nye Babylon - hvordan vesten mistet sin storhet. Ventura Forlag (2018). ISBN 9788283650488
- Herland, Hanne Nabintu; Nature's paradise of Smola, Norway. Partner Forlag. (2019) ISBN 9788284020020
- Herland, Hanne Nabintu; New Left Tyranny. The Authoritarian Destruction of our Way of Life. Christian Publishing House (2020) ISBN 9781949586084
- Herland, Hanne Nabintu; The Billionaire World. How marxism Serves the Elite. PaperTrue (2023) ISBN 9781916606111
