= James Puckle =

British firearm designer (1677–1724)

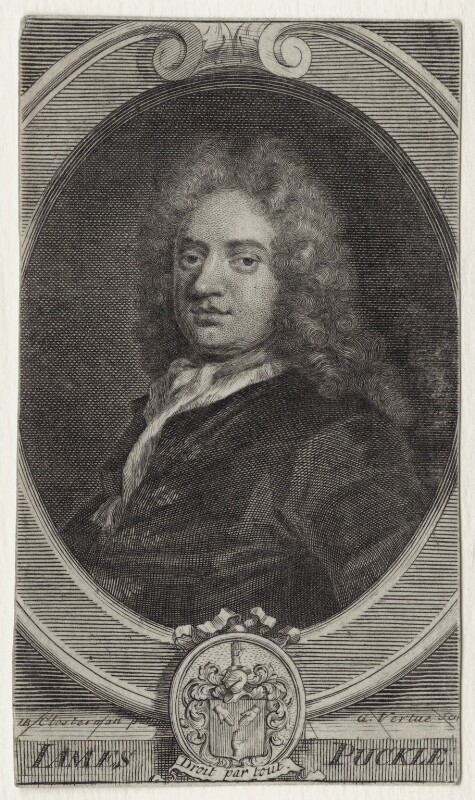
- Line engraving by George Vertue after John Closterman, published in 1713
- Born: James Puckle; 1677; Norwich, Norfolk, England
- Died: 1724 (aged 46–47); London, England
- Occupations: Inventor, gunsmith

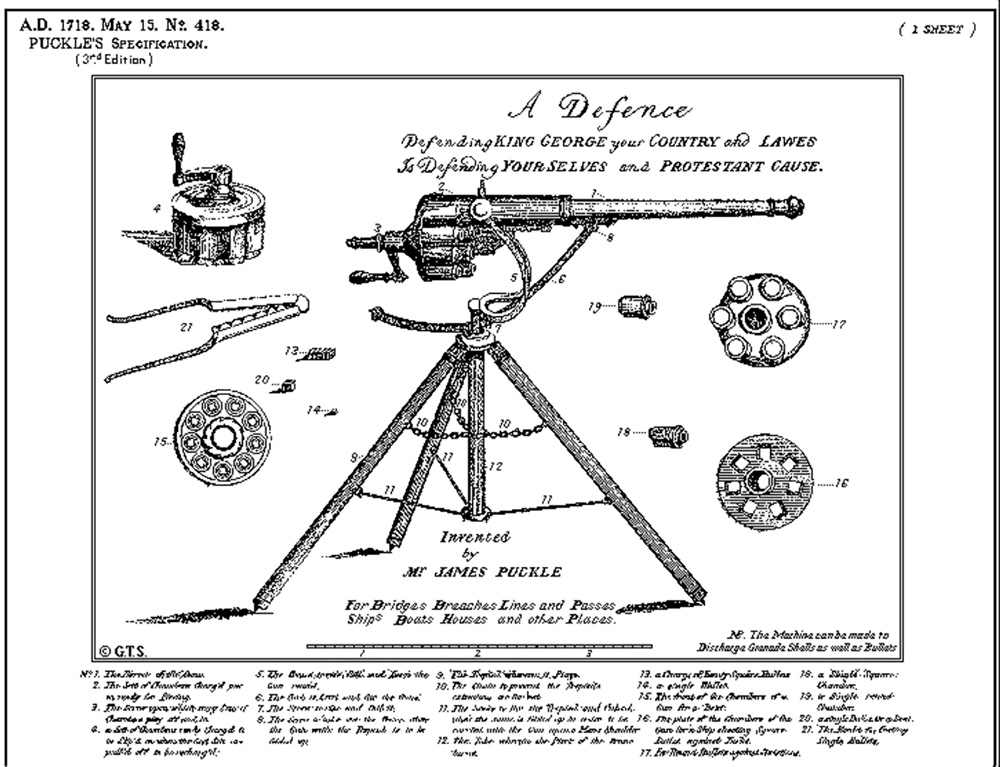
Flier for James Puckle's 1718 patent revolving firearm, shows various cylinders for use with round and square bullets.

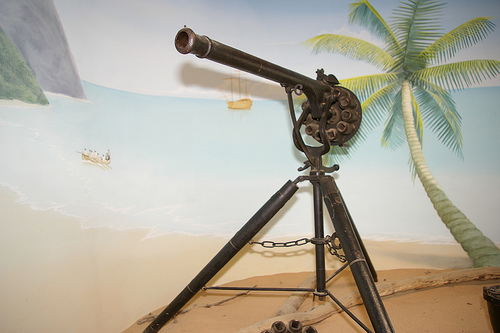
Replica Puckle gun from Buckler's Hard Maritime Museum

James Puckle (1667–1724) was an English inventor, lawyer and writer from London chiefly remembered for his invention of the Defence Gun, better known as the Puckle gun, a multi-shot gun mounted on a stand capable of (depending on which version) firing up to nine rounds per minute. The Puckle gun is one of the first weapons referred to as a machine gun (though its operation does not match the modern definition of the term) and resembles a large revolver.

Puckle's best-known literary work (reprinted as recently as 1900) was The Club, a moral dialogue between a father and son.

== Puckle gun ==
In 1718, Puckle patented his new invention, the Defence Gun — a tripod-mounted, single-barreled flintlock weapon fitted with a multishot revolving cylinder, designed for shipboard use to prevent boarding. The barrel was 3 feet (0.91 m) long with a bore of 1.25 inches (32 mm) and a pre-loaded cylinder which held 6-11 charges and could fire 63 shots in seven minutes—this at a time when the standard soldier's musket could at best be loaded and fired five times per minute.

Puckle demonstrated two versions of the basic design: one, intended for use against Christian enemies, fired conventional round bullets, while the second variant, designed to be used against the Muslim Turks, fired square bullets which were considered to be more damaging and would, according to its patent, convince the Turks of the "benefits of Christian civilization."

The Puckle Gun drew few investors and never achieved mass production or sales to the British armed forces. One leaflet of the period sarcastically observed, following the business venture's failure, that the gun has "only wounded those who hold shares therein."

According to the Patent Office of the United Kingdom, "In the reign of Queen Anne, the law officers of the Crown established as a condition of patent that the inventor must in writing describe the invention and the manner in which it works." James Puckle's 1718 patent, number 418, was one of the first to provide such a description.

John Montagu, 2nd Duke of Montagu, Master-General of the Ordnance (1740-9), purchased at least two for an ill-fated expedition in 1722 to capture St Lucia and St Vincent. One remains on display at Boughton House and another at Beaulieu Palace House (both former Montagu homes).

There is a replica of a Puckle Gun at Bucklers Hard Maritime Museum in Hampshire.

Blackmore's British Military Firearms 1650–1850 lists "Puckle’s brass gun in the Tower of London" as illustration 77: This appears to have been one of the Montagu guns on loan to the Tower at the time.

== Works ==
- The Interest of England considered in an essay upon wool, our woolen manufactures, and the improvement of trade : with some remarks upon the conceptions of Sir Josiah Child. (1694)
- England's interest, or, A brief discourse of the royal fishery in a letter to a friend (1696)
- A new dialogue between a burgermaster and an English gentleman (1697)
- England's way wealth and honour in a dialogue between and English-man and a Dutch-man. (1699)
- The club; or, A gray cap for a green head. A dialogue between a father and son. (1713)
