= Erland Dryselius =

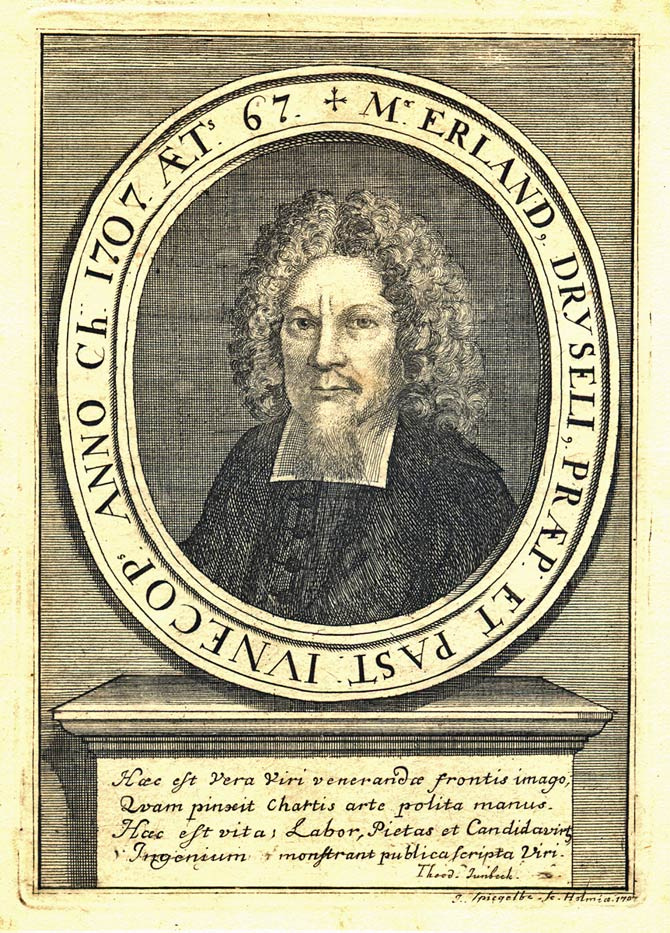
- Born: 1641
- Died: 24 April 1708 (aged 66–67)

Erland (Benedikt, Brodderi) Dryselius (1641 – 24 April 1708) was a Swedish Lutheran minister, historian, and translator.

== Works ==
- Luna Turcica Eller Turkeske Måne..., Jönköping, 1694.
- Kort memorial uppå mag. Erlandi Dryselii P. P. Junecopensis tractater, som han af trycket uthgå låtit..., c. 1700
- Korrt och enfaldig Kyrkiohistoria öfver Gamla och Nya Testamentet, 1704–08.
