= List of massacres in Iraq =

The following is a list of massacres that have occurred in the area of modern Iraq, and does not include collateral damage, especially from raids and airstrikes, which were due to mistaken identity or unfortunately getting caught in the line of fire.

== Pre-20th century ==
Date	Location	Attack	Deaths	(Alleged) Perpetrator	Notes	Source
29 January – 10 February 1258	Baghdad	Siege of Baghdad (1258)	200,000 – 2,000,000	Ilkhanate Mongol Empire; Kingdom of Georgia; Armenian Kingdom of Cilicia	estimates range from 200,000 to 2,000,000 civilian deaths	
21 April 1802	(Ottoman Empire) Karbala	Wahhabi sack of Karbala	2,000-5,000	Emirate of Diriyah	About 12,000 Wahhabi Sunnis under the command of Abdul-Aziz bin Muhammad, the second ruler of the First Saudi State attack and sack Karbala, kill between 2,000 and 5,000 inhabitants and plunder the tomb of Husayn ibn Ali, grandson of Muhammad and son of Ali ibn Abi Talib.	

== Pre-Saddam 20th Century ==
Date	Location	Attack	Deaths	(Alleged) perpetrator	Notes	Source
1915-1917	(Ottoman Empire) Northern Iraq	Yazidi genocide (1915)	300,000-500,000	Ottoman forces, Kurdish tribes	The Yazidis were killed in mass, deported and forcefully converted to Islam, nearly wiped out their population.	
4 May 1924	(Iraq) Kirkuk	1924 Kirkuk massacre	200-300	Assyrian Levies	Assyrian Levies massacre an estimated 200-300 people after a Turkmen shop keeper and Assyrian soldier get into an argument.	
7 August 1933 – 11 August 1933	Northern Kingdom of Iraq, notably at Simele	Simele massacre	Several hundred (British estimate); 3,000–6,000 (Assyrian estimate)	(Iraq) Royal Iraqi Army (led by Bakr Sidqi, Arab and Kurdish tribes	the Iraqi army massacred 600–3,000 Assyrian Christians	
1935–1936	Kingdom of Iraq	1935–1936 Iraqi Shia revolts	200	Kingdom of Iraq, Iraqi Shia tribesmen, Ikha Party	Series of Shia tribal uprisings in the mid-Euphrates region against the Sunni dominated authority of the Kingdom of Iraq. In each revolt, the response of the Iraqi government was to use military force to crush the rebellions with little mercy	
1–2 June 1941	(Iraq) Baghdad	Farhud	~180 to 1,000+ Jews killed ~300–400 pogromists killed during suppression	Rashid Ali, Yunis al-Sabawi, al-Futuwa youths, and Iraqi mobs	Considered "The Beginning of The End of The Jewish Community of Iraq	
12 July 1946	(Kingdom of Iraq) Kirkuk	Gavurbağı massacre	16-20	Iraqi police	Turkmen protestors were massacred	
January 1948	(Iraq) Baghdad	Al-Wathbah uprising	300-400	(Iraq) Iraqi Police	It is estimated that 300 – 400 demonstrators were killed	
April 1950 – June 1951	(Iraq) Baghdad	1950–1951 Baghdad bombings	3–4	Iraqi Zionist agents, Israeli Mossad agents, Iraqi Istiqlal Party agents	Series of bombings of Jewish targets in Baghdad	
14 July 1959	(Iraq) Kirkuk	1959 Kirkuk massacre	71-79	Iraqi Communist Party, Fourth Brigade	Kurdish members of the Iraqi Communist Party target Turkmens leaving an estimated 20 dead. This was followed by Kurdish soldiers from the Fourth Brigade targeting Turkmen residential areas with mortars, causing the destruction of 120 homes. Between 31 and 79 Turkmen were killed with 130 wounded. The Iraqi government referred to the incident as a "massacre".	
27 January 1969	(Iraq) Baghdad	1969 Baghdad hangings	14	Arab Socialist Ba'ath Party	Iraqi authorities hanged 14 Iraqis for allegedly spying for Israel during a public execution in Baghdad; nine were Jewish, three were Muslim and two were Christian	
16 September 1969	(Iraq) Surya	Surya massacre	47	Ba'athist regime	The Iraqi military headed by Lieutenant Abdul Karim al-Jahayshee massacred 47 people in the Assyrian village of Soriya (Ṣawriyā) including the Chaldean priest Ḥannā Yaʻqūb Qāshā and left 22 wounded.	
1975	(Iraq) Najaf	Najaf purges	100	Ba'athist regime	Over 100 Shi’ite clerics killed and 1250 arrested.	
4-9 February 1977	(Iraq) Najaf and Karbala	1977 Shia uprising in Iraq	unknown	Ba'athist regime	Despite brutally enforced ban on public religiousness, thousands of people defy it and head to Karbala during the Arba'een Pilgrimage. Hundreds were killed and thousands arrested by the regime.	

== Saddam Era ==
Date	Location	Attack	Deaths	(Alleged) Perpetrator	Notes	Source
22 July 1979	(Iraq) Khuld hall	1979 Ba'ath Party Purge	21	Ba'athist regime organized by Saddam Hussein	Internal purge of the Iraqi Ba'ath Party after the new president Saddam Hussein assumed power and alleged a Syrian back coup d'etat. 68 people were arrested, of which 21 were executed by firing squad.	
1968–2003	Ba'athist Iraq	Ba'athist Arabization campaigns in northern Iraq	2,500 to 12,500	Arab Socialist Ba'ath Party	Between 1968 and 2003, the ruling Arab Socialist Ba'ath Party of the Iraqi Republic perpetrated multiple campaigns of demographic engineering against the country's non-Arabs. While Arabs constitute the majority of Iraq's population as a whole, they are not the majority in parts of northern Iraq, and a minority in Iraqi Kurdistan. In an attempt to Arabize the north, the Iraqi government pursued a policy of ethnic cleansing, killing and forcefully displacing a large number of Iraqi minorities—predominantly Kurds, but also Turkmen, Yazidis, Assyrians, Shabaks, Mandaeans, and Armenians, among others—and subsequently allotting the cleared land to Arab settlers	
1980s	Ba'athist Iraq	Persecution of Shi'a muslims and political dissidents under Saddam Hussein	50,000-70,000 Shi'a and 50,000 dissidents disappeared. Full death toll unknown.	Saddam Hussein	50,000 to 70,000 Shi'a, and 50,000 opposition activists, communists, Kurds and other minorities disappeared into Iraqi prisons in the 1980s	
1970-2003	(Iraq) Nationwide	Persecution of Feyli Kurds under Saddam Hussein	25,000 killed	Saddam Hussein, Tariq Aziz	May 7, 1980, Persecution of Feyli Kurds under Saddam Hussein, Nationwide; 15,000–25,000 Feyli Kurds were targeted in a genocide via exportation and forced relocations.	
8 July 1982	(Iraq) Dujail	Dujail massacre	148	Iraqi Ba'ath Party	Judicial reprisal targeting Shia Muslims following a failed assassination attempt on Saddam Hussein by the Islamic Dawa Party. Saddam would eventually be executed for crimes against humanity in relation to the massacre.	
10 May 1983	(Iraq) Specific location unknown	Massacre of the Hakim family	Hundreds	Saddam Hussein	Saddam ordered further arrest of all Hakim family. Hundreds were killed and buried in mass graves.	
July–August 1983	(Iraq) Kurdistan Region	Repression of Barzani Kurds under Ba'ath regime	8000	Saddam Hussein	In July and August 1983, on the orders of President Saddam Hussein, over 8,000 men and boys of the Barzani Kurds, some as young as 13, were killed by the Ba'athist Iraq.	
16 March 1984	(Iraq) Abu Ghraib prison	Abu Ghraib purge	4000	Arab Socialist Ba'ath Party – Iraq Region	A mass grave was discovered at the Abu Ghraib prison, containing the bodies of thousands following a purge. Estimated 4000 dead.	
23 February – 6 September 1988	(Iraq) Kurdistan Region	Anfal Campaign	50,000–182,000	Saddam Hussein, Ali Hassan al-Majid, Hussein Rashid	Counter insurgency operation during the Iran–Iraq War targeting primarily Kurds, as well as other minority groups that had allegedly collaborated with the Iranian Army. During the campaign, the Iraqi government made extensive use of chemical weapons which resulted in thousands of casualties. Use of enforced disappearances, mass deportation and detention camps were also present. The operation is recognized as a genocide by Human Rights Watch.	
16 March 1988	(Iraq) Halabja, Kurdistan Region	Halabja massacre	3,200–5,000	Iraqi Republic	Iraqi government used chemical weapons on Kurdish town, At least 3,200–5,000 people died as an immediate result of the chemical attack and it is estimated that a further 7,000-10,000 people were injured or suffered long-term illness.	
13 February 1991	(Iraq) Al-A'amiriya, Baghdad	Amiriyah shelter bombing	408+	United States Air Force	Two laser-guided "smart bombs" destroy an underground bunker in Baghdad, killing 408+ civilians of Iraqis. US military intelligence claims it was a military facility while Iraqi officials identify it as a bomb shelter	
1 March – 5 April 1991	(Iraq) nationwide	1991 Iraqi uprisings	25,000–180,000 killed (Predominantly civilians)	Iraqi Republic,	In response to multiple insurrections led by a variety of Kurdish, Leftist and Shia Islamist groups, the Iraqi government violently repressed the rebellion. Chemical weapons and nerve agents such as Mustard Gas, Sarin and Phosgene were allegedly used, though this has been disputed.	
28 March 1991	(Iraq) Altun Kupri, Kirkuk Governorate	1991 Altun Kupri massacre	1,000-3,500	(Iraq) Iraqi Army on the order of Saddam Hussein, Iraqi Ba'ath Party, Arab nationalists	The massacre targeted Turkmens, in particular males, both children and adults alike, and was organized by security forces affiliated with Saddam Hussein's army	
7 October 1991	(Iraq) Sulaymaniyah, Sulaymaniyah Governorate	Sulaymaniyah massacre	60+	(Kurdistan Region) Kurdish fighters (allegedly affiliated with the Kurdistan Democratic Party)	Executed unarmed and surrendered Iraqi Army soldiers following the 1991 uprisings. Witnessed by journalists and condemned by human rights organizations.	

== After 2003 ==
- May 19, 2004 – Mukaradeeb wedding party massacre, refers to the U.S. military's attack on a wedding party in Mukaradeeb, a small village in Anbar Province, Iraq near the border with Syria, on 19 May 2004. The attack killed 42 civilians and wounded many others.
- August 1, 2004 – 2004 church bombings in Baghdad and Mosul, Baghdad and Mosul; 12 died, 71 injured.
- September 12, 2004 – Haifa Street helicopter incident that killed at least 13 civilians by American helicopters.
- October 24, 2004 – Massacre of New Iraqi Army recruits by Sunni insurgents, 49 killed.
- November 19, 2005 Haditha massacre, Haditha 24 Iraqi civilians were killed by United States Marines.
- March 12, 2006 Mahmudiyah rape and killings on by U.S. Army soldiers, 4 killed.
- March 15, 2006, the Ishaqi massacre, where four women and five children, one aged five months were allegedly killed by U.S. Forces. This was denied by the Americans, who said a building collapsed during a firefight, killing four people—a suspect, two women and a child.
- March 2006, US troops killed 4 Iraq prisoners.
- Between May 7 and 8, 2006, 51 bodies were found in Baghdad, all handcuffed, blindfolded and shot in the head and abdomen.
- July 9, 2006, Hayy Al-Jihad massacre on by Shia militia, 40 killed.
- April 23, 2007, April 2007 Yazidi massacre, Mosul; 23 died; the murders were considered to be a reprisal for the honor killing of a 17-year-old Yazidi girl.
- On April 17, 2007, 51 bodies of Iraqi civilians and military personnel, who were killed in the previous two years, were found in Mahmudiya, south of Baghdad.
- June 29, 2007, Al Ahamir Massacre, Al Ahamir, 10-14 Iraqi civilians were killed by Al Qaeda.
- On June 30, 2007, 35 to 40 bodies were recovered from a recently dug mass grave in the town of Ferris, south of Fallujah, most likely victims of sectarian violence.
- July 16, 2007, massacre of Shiite villagers in a village in Diyala province on by Sunni insurgents, 29 killed.
- September 16, 2007, Nisour Square massacre, Baghdad: Blackwater Baghdad shootings by a private military company, 17 killed. The private military company, Blackwater Security Consulting, shot at Iraqi civilians killing 17 and injuring 20 in Nisour Square, Baghdad while escorting a US embassy convoy.
- Following the conclusion of the 2007 Diyala province military campaign dozens of mass graves were found. It is unclear who was responsible although Al-Qaeda is suspected.
- April 4, 2010, insurgents dressed as US and Iraqi soldiers killed 25 people including 5 women in a village south of Baghdad. They were linked to the Awakening movement. They were handcuffed and shot in the head or chest. Seven were found alive in handcuffs. Major General Qassim Atta spokesman for the Iraqi security forces' Baghdad operations said Al-Qaeda in Iraq was behind this.
- October 31, 2010, Baghdad church attack, Baghdad; 58 died; Islamic State of Iraq attacked a Catholic church.
- April 8, 2011, Camp Ashraf raid, Camp Ashraf; 34 unarmed members of the People's Mujahedin of Iran were killed by Iraqi security forces. 300+ injured.
- March 2012, Emo killings in Iraq by terrorists in Baghdad.
- 2013 Camp Ashraf massacre that killed 52 people by the Islamic Revolutionary Guard Corps on September 1, 2013.
- June 10, 2014, Badush prison massacre that killed 670 by the Islamic State of Iraq.
- June 10, 2014 – August 8, 2015, Mass executions in Islamic State-occupied Mosul where over 6,539 people have been killed.
- June 12, 2014, Camp Speicher massacre, where 1,700 people were murdered in Mosul by the Islamic State of Iraq.
- August 2014 – Sinjar massacre, about 5,000 Yazidis massacred by ISIS.
- January 28, 2015 – Barwana massacre, 70 unarmed boys and men by Shia militas (allegedly).
- September 1, 2016 – Islamic State reportedly executed nine Mosul youths with a chainsaw for being part of an opposing group.
- March 17, 2017 – 2017 Mosul airstrike, hundreds of civilians were killed by United States forces during the battle of Mosul.
- January 21, 2022 – 2022 Diyala massacre that killed 11 people by the Islamic State of Iraq.
- July 20, 2022 – Zakho resort attack killed 9 tourists, the perpetrator remains disputed.
