= Persecution of the Iraqi Turkmen by the Islamic State =

Overview of crimes committed against Iraqi Turkmen by the Islamic State from 2014 to 2017

- Part of the Northern Iraq offensive (August 2014), the War in Iraq (2013–2017), the persecution of Shias by the Islamic State, and the aftermath of the persecution of Iraqi Turkmen in Ba'athist Iraq
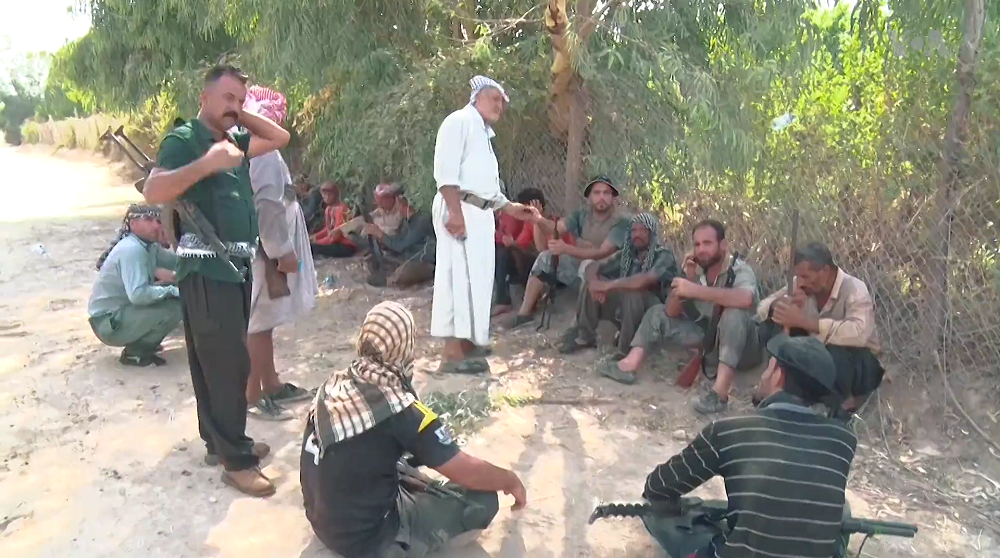
- A local anti-IS militia in the Shia Turkmen town of Qara Tapa in 2018
- Location: Iraq
- Date: 1 August 2014 – 31 August 2017
- Target: Iraqi Turkmen
- Attack type: Massacre, ethnic cleansing, forced conversion, rape, sexual slavery
- Victims: 600,000+ displaced
- Perpetrator: Islamic State
- Motive: Islamic extremism; Anti-Shi'ism; Islamic Statism

Persecution of the Iraqi Turkmen by the Islamic State refers to the series of killings, rapes, executions, expulsions, and sexual slavery of the Iraqi Turkmen in Islamic State-controlled territory. The persecution began when IS captured Iraqi Turkmen lands in 2014 and continued until IS lost all of their land in Iraq. In 2017, it was officially recognized as a genocide by the Parliament of Iraq, and in 2018, the sexual slavery was also recognized by the United Nations.

== Background and lead-up ==
=== Iraqi Turkmen ===
Iraqi Turkmen are the third largest ethnic group in Iraq. They are of Turkic descent and they live in the Turkmeneli historical region, surrounded by Arabs to the south and surrounded by Kurds to the north. They are almost evenly divided between Sunni and Shia, with a small Catholic minority. There was also sectarianism between Sunni and Shia Turkmen, which often escalated to armed clashes. Iraqi Turkmen were persecuted under Ba'athist rule, and even after the 2003 invasion of Iraq and the fall of Saddam Hussein, the persecution was directly continued by Ba'ath loyalist and Islamist groups which continued to target Turkmen during the Iraqi insurgency until 2013, when the persecution by the Islamic State began. They had also been targeted during the 1996 Erbil massacre, 1991 Altun Kupri massacre, 1959 Kirkuk massacre, 1946 Gavurbağı massacre, 1924 Kirkuk massacre, and the Anfal campaign.

=== Lead-up ===
During the June 2014 Northern Iraq offensive, IS captured many lands that are Turkmen-majority or have significant Turkmen populations, such as Mosul, Tal Afar, Tikrit and parts of Kirkuk and Diyala provinces.

== Persecution ==
In June 2014, when IS's army first captured Tal Afar, it abducted 1,300 Iraqi Turkmen, around 700 men, 470 women and 130 children. The Iraqi Turkmen Front stated that only 42 of the 1,300 abductees have returned, and the rest of them have not been seen again, with reports that many of those kidnapped were subjected to sexual violence before being killed. Turkmen houses were burnt down, their livestock were stolen and many of them were forced to flee. In September 2014, at least 350,000 Turkmen, the majority of them were from Tal Afar, became displaced. They were in danger of dying of starvation. Since the attacks, around 90 percent of Tal Afar's Turkmens have fled, according to residents and local activists. Mahdi al-Bayati, the former Iraqi Minister of Human Rights and a spokesperson for the Turkmen Rescue Foundation, claimed that the number of Turkmen refugees rose to 600,000 in February 2017. Mehdi al-Beyati also claimed that every Turkmen region's infrastructure was badly damaged by IS. In September 2014, the UN sent a team into Iraq to investigate the crimes, and Amnesty International presented evidence of the Islamic State committing acts of ethnic cleansing against minorities in northern Iraq, including Turkmen. Between June and December 2014, UNPO reported that 90% of the population of Tal Afar had fled, with 300 Iraqi Turkmen having been killed, and 500 more kidnapped. In total over 500,000 Turkmen were displaced due to the attacks.

Many Islamic State militants were former soldiers in the Iraqi Army under Saddam Hussein, who had a history of massacring and persecuting Iraqi Turkmen.

On 9 June, 15 Turkmen prisoners from Tal Afar were killed by IS in Mosul. After the bombing of a Shia mosque in the same town, many people fled the city and nine refugees were killed. 65 children from the Yazidi and Turkmen communities were left in an orphanage in Mosul, who were traumatized from witnessing their parents' murders. Some of these children were sexually abused.

During the Fall of Mosul in June 2014, the Islamic State attacked the Turkish consulate of Mosul and kidnapped 49 diplomats. Ahmet Davutoğlu stated that "no one should try to test the limits of Turkey's strength", although the Islamic State ignored the warning and attacked Turkmen in Tal Afar on June 10, after capturing Mosul. Turkey did not respond to the attacks, which caused Turkish politicians from secular and nationalist groups to heavily criticize Recep Tayyip Erdoğan and Ahmet Davutoğlu, accusing them of having allowed the persecution of Iraqi Turkmen.

On 16 June, 2014, IS massacred at least 40 Turkmen from 4 different locations (Chardaghli, Qaranaz, Bashir, Birawchi), all near the city of Kirkuk. A day after, another 52 Turkmen were killed in Bashir. The same location suffered again once in 18 June and between 20 and 21 June, killing five and then 17 civilians. According to a witness from Bashir, 700 Turkmens were massacred in the town. In 2014 June, IS abducted 26 Shia Turkmen from Al-Shamsiyat village. During the same month, Shia Turkmens fled from Al-Kibba and Shrikhan after threats from IS. Many Turkmen residents of the villages Talafar, Bashir, Birawchi and Qaranaz also fled after receiving more letters from the jihadists.

On 18 June during the clashes between IS and Iraqi Ground Forces between the towns of Amirli and Tuz Khurmatu, at least 20 Turkmen civilians were killed. During the siege of Amirli, 150 people lost their lives due to the harsh conditions, including 50 children and 10 new borns. After Amirli's fall in 2014, the town's electricity, food and water supplies were cut. Dozens lost their lives, including pregnant women, before a humanitarian aid was delivered. Homes and schools, as well as mosques in Qaranaz, Chardaghli and Birawchi were burnt down.

On 23 June, IS abducted at least 75 Turkmen from the areas of Guba, Shrikhan, and Talafar. Only 2 bodies were found, in a valley north of Guba. They were likely executed. 950 Turkmen families fled the areas after IS demanded them to leave. In the same villages three Shiite places of worship were dynamited, and 25 people died during the attacks.

Thousands of Shia Turkmen from Tal Afar fled to Sinjar when Tal Afar fell to ISIS. However, the Islamic State attacked Sinjar, causing many of the Shia Turkmen to flee once again. During the Sinjar massacre on 3 August, there were many Shia Turkmen among the 50,000 Yazidis trapped at Mount Sinjar. On 7 August, an additional 100 Turkmen males were executed in Sinjar.

A total of 600 Turkmen women were captured and used as sex slaves by IS. Around 400–500 of them were sent to IS's makeshift prisons in Syria. In February 2018, a group of women protested outside a UN Human Rights Office in Kirkuk. They held signs and demanded that the Iraqi government do something to recover around 450 missing Turkmen women, but the protest was ignored. Hasan Turan, leader of the ITF, feared that if the Turkmen women were to return, they would likely become victims of honor killings by their families. He stated that "Many girls won't return, and I can only hope their families still accept them if they return. They are the victims." Later in 2018, the UN formally recognized the sexual slavery of Turkmen women. An unnamed Turkmen woman, from the small town of al-Alam near Tikrit, who survived IS, told BBC Turkish that IS separated the single girls from the married women, and began to rape the single girls in front of everyone. ISIS also raped the town's only Turkish language teacher to the point that she died.

The Islamic State burning Shia Turkmen women alive had become such a common occurrence that Turkmen women who were captured by the Islamic State pretended to be Sunni or Arab in hopes of more leniency.

Children were also victims of kidnapping usually for training reasons. In Nineveh on 13 March, 25 Turkmen children between 10 and 17 years old were kidnapped from the Bara'am orphanage and sent to children training camps in Talafar.

In March, a mass grave belonging to 16 Turkmen was found in Bashir, near Kirkuk. The same month, IS executed 9 Turkmen widows in Qara Quyan, Nineveh, whose husbands were killed by jihadists. The reason for their execution was their refusal to marry IS fighters. In the village of Birawchi, IS kidnapped two Turkmen after killing 23 residents of the village. In Guba and Shrikhan, 60 Turkmen boys and men were abducted. On the same month, a young Turkmen named Erhan Camci was kidnapped from his house in Kirkuk.

In April 2015, an Iraqi Turkmen MP disclosed that over 400 Iraqi Turkmen, mostly women and children, had been kidnapped by IS over the past few months. In February 2016, another politician confirmed them to be 416 individuals, most of whom were never seen again and believed to have been raped and killed.

In August, in Mosul, IS publicly executed 700 Iraqi Turkmen, accusing them of apostasy.

A single 2015 IS car bombing in Saladin province took the lives of 40 Turkmen. The ITF stated that the IS attacks on Iraqi Turkmens was a strategic ethnic cleansing campaign. 540 Turkmen civilians from Tal Afar went missing, including 125 women, again at the hands of IS, and only 22 of them were found again.

In summer 2015, around 3,000 Turkmen fled the town of Amirli. In late 2015, around 7,500 Turkmen fled to Karbala.

Taza Khurmatu, with 40,000 residents, all Turkmen, was attacked by ISIS from March 7 to March 9. ISIS fired over 200 rockets, katyushas, and mortars, and used chlorine and mustard gas. The chemical weapons affected 7,000 people, 167 so severely that they had to be taken to Turkey for treatment. 25,000 fled from the town. In the same year, the village of Bashir was also attacked with chemical weapons. In May 2016, the Peshmerga and Iraqi Shia militias captured Bashir, which returned to Iraqi government control. 90% of Bashir was destroyed during its retake in 2016, including 250 houses. In the village of Bashir, 9 Turkmen women were kidnapped, raped, killed, and had their bodies displayed lampposts. Afterwards, a 12-year-old girl was raped by multiple ISIS militants and hung on an electricity pole. When the residents tried to retrieve her body, ISIS snipers opened fire, killing 15 men. Rape cases were recorded after the fall of Tuz Khurmatu on June as well.

In January 2017, a mass grave in Rashidiya, near Mosul was found by Iraqi Armed Forces. The grave belonged to 27 massacred Turkmen men and boys. Their bodies had traces of torture.

== Destruction of heritage ==
IS is responsible for the destruction of historical artifacts that were important to Iraqi Turkmen. Many century-old mosques, whether Sunni or Shia, as well as libraries were destroyed. The oldest library in Tal Afar was blown up, while another library with over 1,500 historical books in Diyala was destroyed. Among the destroyed artifacts were the Mausoleum of Yahya Abu al-Qasim (built in 1293 by the Zengids, destroyed in 2014), the Mausoleum of Imam Awn Al-Din (built in 1248 by the Zengids, destroyed in 2014), the Shrine of Qadib Al-Ban Mosuli (built by the Zengids, destroyed in 2014), the Al-Imam Muhsin Mosque (built by the Seljuks, severely damaged in 2015), the Great Mosque of al-Nuri (built in 1172 by the Zengids, destroyed in 2017), the Imam al-Baher Mosque (built in 1259, destroyed in 2014), and the Mosque of the Pasha (built in 1881 by the Ottomans, destroyed).

== Aftermath ==
The persecution had an impact on regional demographics, and was even said to have shrunk the traditional Turkmen region. It also weakened Turkmen political influence in Mosul, Diyala, and Saladin province, and inflamed sectarian tensions. After the defeat of the Islamic State, there were extrajudicial killings of Sunni Turkmen by the Iraqi Army. Shia Turkmen militias in Tuz Khurmatu harassed, kidnapped, arbitrarily detained, tortured, and killed Sunni Arab civilians, while looting and destroying their houses. Furthermore, Shia Turkmen militias blocked the return of Sunni Arab residents in Tuz Khurmatu and Kirkuk. Shia Turkmen militias also targeted Sunni Turkmen. Locals from the mixed neighborhoods of Tuz Khurmatu estimated that in March 2018, only 5-10 percent of the original Sunni Arab population and 10 percent of the original Sunni Turkmen population remained. Shia Turkmen attacks on Sunni Arab and Sunni Turkmen communities were fewer in areas outside of Tuz Khurmatu, as there were few Sunni Turkmen or Sunni Arabs left. Nearly all Shia Turkmen of Amirli returned by March 2018, although no Arabs or Sunni Turkmen (an estimated 15,000 families or more) had returned to areas controlled by the PMF. Shia Turkmen militias engaged in significant destruction of homes and property of Sunni Turkmen while they were absent. The destruction of Sunni Arab and Sunni Turkmen property showed patterns of an effort to permanently change the demographics in favor of Shia Turkmen, according to some human rights groups and local informants. In Tuz Khurmatu, there were also clashes between Sunni Kurds and Shia Turkmen. In Tal Afar, which came under the control of the PMF, there was increased tensions between the Sunni Turkmen and Shia Turkmen inhabitants of the city. Shia Turkmen supported the Shia Turkmen militias allied to Iran, while Sunni Turkmen supported parties allied to Turkey. The tensions were part of the Iran-Turkey proxy conflict and reached a point to where Recep Tayyip Erdoğan threatened military involvement to protect Sunni Turkmen interests. By 2017, around 1,200 Turkmen women, girls and children kidnapped by the Islamic State remained missing.

Various scholars stated that the violence against religious minorities in Iraq, including Yazidis, Christians, Kakayis, Turkmens and Shabak, met the definition of genocide under Article II of the 1948 Genocide Convention and called for official recognition, with various international organisations having called the minority groups victims of genocide targeted by ISIS.

In 2017, the Parliament of Iraq officially recognized the persecution as genocide, and in 2018, the United Nations officially recognized the sexual slavery of Iraqi Turkmen women. In 2021, the Iraqi federal government pass a law providing reparations to female victims of sexual violence by ISIS, from the Yazidi, Christian, Turkmen, and Shabak minority groups. There was a particularly high demand from members of parliament to distinctly recognize the persecution of Shia Turkmen, as it was also sectarian and disproportionate in comparison to Sunni Turkmen. The demands were met with an acrimonious response from Mohamed Al-Halbousi on March 1, 2021, and he refused to include the Shia Turkmen in the Yazidi Survivor Law passed by the Iraqi parliament that day, claiming that it would be sectarian language. The United States Commission on International Religious Freedom in its 2024 report on religious freedom in Iraq, labelled the Iraqi Turkmen as one of the minority groups that were a victim of ISIS' genocides. Turkmen have continued to advocate that the Iraqi government do more to locate and excavate suspected mass graves of Turkmen victims.

== See also ==
- Persecution of Iraqi Turkmen in Ba'athist Iraq
- 1991 Altun Kupri massacre
- Turkmen Martyrs' Day
- List of massacres of Turkish people
- Yazidi genocide
- Persecution of Christians by the Islamic State
- Persecution of Shias by the Islamic State
- Genocides in history
- Genocide studies
