= Arabization of Kirkuk =

Part of the Iraqi–Kurdish conflict

- Part of the Iraqi–Kurdish conflict, the Ba'athist Arabization campaigns in northern Iraq, and the Persecution of Iraqi Turkmen in Ba'athist Iraq
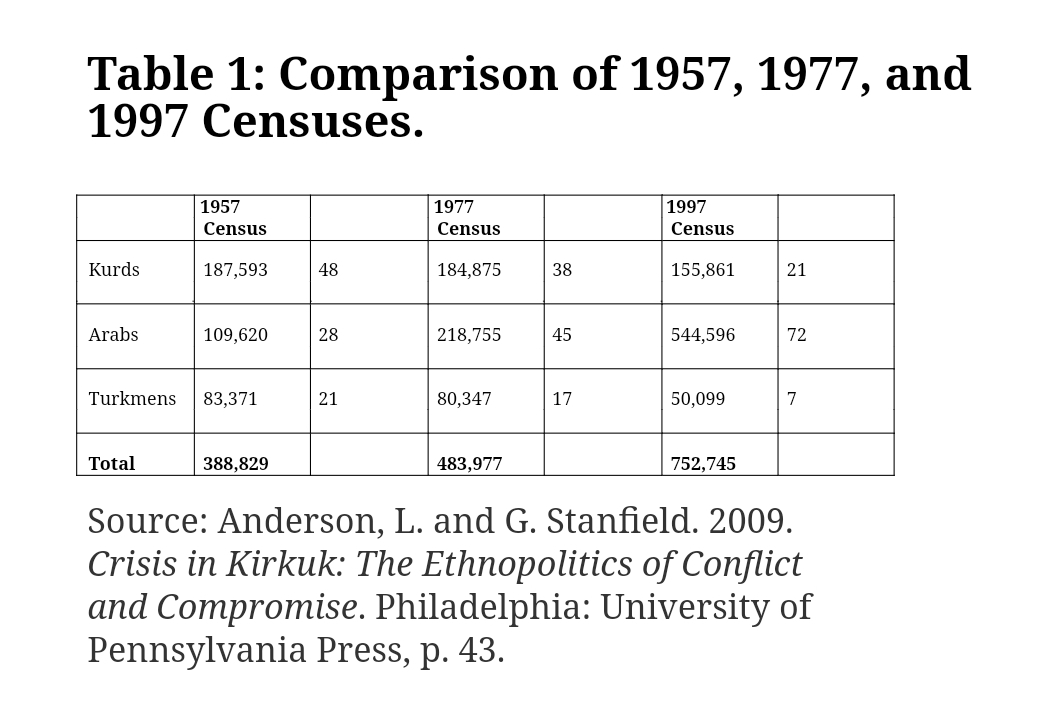
- Statistics of the Kirkuk Governorate in the years 1957, 1977, and 1997: Arabs have become the ethnic majority by a landslide, while Kurds and Turkmen have seen their population dwindle due to the Iraqi government's demographic engineering.
- Native name: بەعەرەبکردنی کەرکووک
- Location: Kirkuk, Iraq
- Date: 1960s–present
- Target: Kurds, Turkmen, Assyrians, etc.
- Perpetrators: Kingdom of Iraq (1921–1950s); Ba'athist Iraq (1960s–2003); Iraq (2006–present)

The Arabization of Kirkuk (Kurdish: عەرەباندنی کەرکووک also بەعەرەبکردنی کەرکووک or تەعریبی کەرکووک, Turkish: Kerkük'ün Araplaşması) began in Ba'athist Iraq in the 1960s. In line with the wider Ba'athist Arabization campaigns in northern Iraq, the Iraqi government worked to alter the demographic composition of the Kirkuk Governorate by ethnically cleansing non-Arabs—mainly Kurds, but also Turkmen and Assyrians, among others—and replacing them with Arab settlers. This campaign peaked under the rule of Iraqi president Saddam Hussein, who sought to ensure Arab control over northern Iraq (i.e., Iraqi Kurdistan), especially during the Iran–Iraq War.

Although the Ba'ath Party was toppled by the 2003 invasion of Iraq, the issue of Arabization in non-Arab regions has persisted and caused tensions between the Iraqi government in Baghdad and the Kurdistan Region, as attested by the cancelled Kirkuk status referendum and the 2017 Kurdistan Region independence referendum, which triggered the 2017 Iraqi–Kurdish conflict.

== Overview ==
The Arabization of Kirkuk began in earnest during the late 1960s under Saddam Hussein's Ba'athist regime. The policy was motivated by Kirkuk's rich oil reserves and its strategic location, which made control over the region crucial to the central government. The Ba'ath Party sought to ensure Arab domination of Kirkuk by forcibly displacing Kurds and other ethnic minorities and replacing them with Arabs from southern Iraq.

Alongside Arabization, and before the Arabization began, Kirkuk went through the process of Turkification, and after the declaration of monarchy in Iraq in 1921, the essence of Arabization and Turkification policies were pursued in the new country by the British authorities to balance the country's ethnic groups. During the late Ottoman era, Turkification policies were implemented as part of efforts to centralize and unify the empire. These measures aimed to promote Turkish as the dominant language and culture, influencing multi-ethnic cities like Kirkuk. The administrative policies prioritized Turkish identity, which reinforced the presence of the Turkmens in the region. These efforts marginalized the Kurdish and Arab populations, creating linguistic and cultural tensions that shaped Kirkuk's demographic and political landscape into the modern era. Kirkuk has also witnessed Kurdification, particularly after the invasion of Iraq.

== Implementation ==
The Arabization policy involved forced evictions, land confiscation, and changing the administrative boundaries of the Kirkuk region to reduce the proportion of Kurds and other non-Arab populations. During this period, Kurdish and Turkmen residents were forced to sign "nationality correction" forms, requiring them to identify as Arabs or face expulsion.

Many Kurdish families were displaced to remote areas or neighboring provinces, while Arab families from central and southern Iraq were encouraged to settle in Kirkuk, often receiving government incentives such as housing and employment. Additionally, the government changed the names of neighborhoods and towns to reflect Arab heritage, erasing many elements of Kurdish and Turkmen identity.

The Ba'athist government allegedly settled Palestinians in homes of Kurds and Turkmen, and it attracted more attention when Jalal Talabani spoke on it, and called for Kurds and Turkmen to put their differences aside to reclaim their homes.

=== Post-2003 ===
Following the fall of Saddam Hussein's regime in 2003, there were efforts by displaced Kurds and Turkmen to reclaim their homes and lands. In 2014, following the successful ISIS offensive against Iraqi governmental forces and the withdrawal of the latter from parts of northern Iraq, including Kirkuk, the city was seized by Kurdish Peshmerga. In 2016, Amnesty International published a report documenting the Kurdification of Kirkuk carried out by the Peshmerga. The report highlighted incidents of bulldozing Arab homes and banishing the residents throughout the period of Kurdish control of the city. Senior Crisis Response Advisor Donatella Rovera stated, “KRG forces appear to be spearheading a concerted campaign to forcibly displace Arab communities by destroying entire villages in areas they have recaptured from IS in northern Iraq”. In 2017, Kurdistan Region sought to secede from Iraq by holding a referendum of independence which was rejected by the government of Iraq. This triggered the 2017 Iraqi-Kurdish conflict wherein Iraqi forces attacked the Peshmerga, defeating them, retaking control of Kirkuk and causing large numbers of Kurds to flee, leading to yet another saga of demographic change. Immediately after the conflict, Iraqi Kurds were markedly concerned about the resumption of Arabization in Kirkuk.

By 2024, local leaders continued to report ongoing efforts by the Iraqi central government to implement policies resembling the earlier Arabization strategies, causing heightened tensions between the different ethnic groups in the region. Describing the Arabization as reaching a “critical level”, Kurdistan24 reported that since Iraqi forces retook control, more than 100,000 Arab families have been resettled from other cities to the center and surrounding areas of Kirkuk.

== Human rights violations ==
Human Rights Watch has documented numerous abuses associated with the Arabization campaign, including forced displacement, destruction of homes, and the denial of basic rights to displaced Kurds, Turkmen, and Assyrians. These policies have contributed to long-standing grievances among these communities, who continue to demand restitution and compensation for their lost lands.

== See also ==
- Arabization
- Kirkuk status referendum
- Ba'athist Arabization campaigns in northern Iraq
- Destruction of Kurdish villages during the Iraqi Arabization campaign
- Disputed territories of Northern Iraq
