= 1959 Kirkuk massacre =

Massacre targeting Iraqi Turkmens

- Part of the Aftermath of the 14 July Revolution and the Iraqi–Kurdish conflict
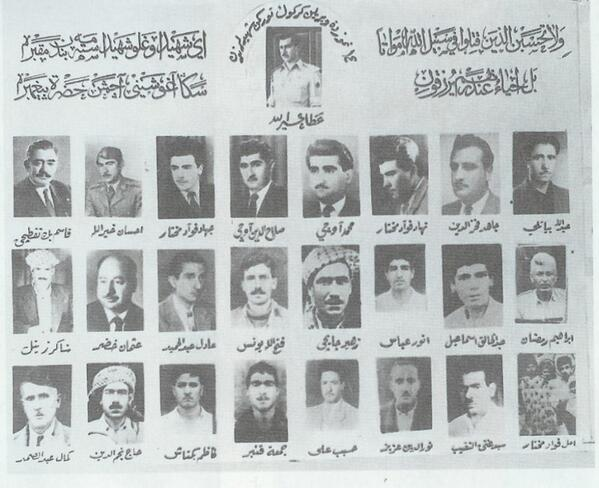
- Some of the victims of the 1959 Kirkuk massacre
- Location: Kirkuk, Iraq
- Date: July 14–16, 1959
- Target: Iraqi Turkmen
- Deaths: 79
- Injuries: 140
- Perpetrators: Kurdish and Arab members of the Iraqi Communist Party; Popular Resistance Force (PRF)
- Motive: Anti-Turkish sentiment, Kurdish nationalism
- Charges: 26 perpetrators sentenced to death

The 1959 Kirkuk massacre was a massacre of Iraqi Turkmen in Kirkuk, Iraq, which lasted from 14 July to 16 July 1959. The perpetrators were mostly Kurdish members of the Iraqi Communist Party and some Arab members. The massacre was a major event in Iraqi Turkmen history. The massacre was described as an ethnically motivated attack with no association to politics.

== Background ==
Kirkuk, one of the major cities of Iraq, used to have two main communities before the 1970s: the Kurds and Turkmen. Both of them claimed the city, however unlike the Kurds and Arabs, the Turkmen did not take part in the ethnic-nationalists struggles, although they still tried to maintain their ethnic and cultural identity. According to the USA Army officer and historian Peter Mansoor, the Turkmen were "caught in the crossfire between the two large groups."

The Kurds moved to Kirkuk to avoid the harsh economy in the countryside, increasing their number in Kirkuk due to the oil industry, meanwhile the number of the Turkmen was declining. The demographic change was followed by the appointment of ethnic Kurds in many important posts in the city, which had historical importance to the Turkmen. This made them feel marginalized and outcast.

The massacre took place exactly one year after the Iraqi coup d'état in 1958, when Abdul-Karim Qasim became the Primer Minister of the country and declared the republic. The Mosul revolt (provoked by Arab nationalists) was put down with the help of communists, Iraqi nationalists and the Kurds. Soon the communists became so influential that they were damaging Qasim's prestige. General Nadhim al-Tabaqchali, an Arab nationalist leader in the Iraqi army executed in the 1959 Mosul uprising, had exploited tensions between Kurds and Turkmen to prolong and intensify ethnic conflicts between the communities. The conservative and nationalist forces tried to manipulate and destabilize the leftist Qasim regime. The culmination of this insurgency was the Kirkuk massacre of 1959, which had begun with the attack by communists and Kurds; the two groups were allied as the former associated the Turkmen with Turkey, the West and NATO while the Kurds desired a clear Kurdish majority in Kirkuk.

== Massacre ==
=== 14 July ===
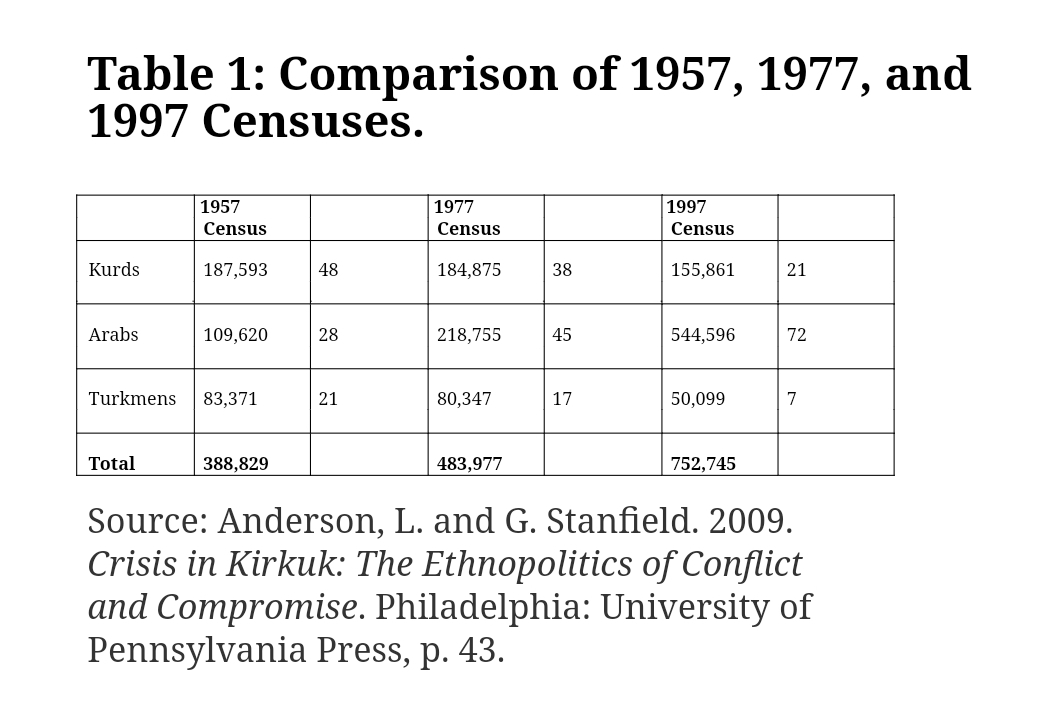
Demographics of Kirkuk Governorate

The situation in the city was already tense over the election of a mayor of Kurdish origin in early July 1959. Brigadier General Dawood al-Janabi had recently been appointed as the commander of the second division of the Iraqi army in Kirkuk, and he had permitted communist groups to operate in the city. On 14 July, every ethnic group, including the Turkmen, were on the streets to attend the parade and celebrate the 14 July Revolution which had installed Abdul-Karim Qasim as the leader of Iraq. When the official parade cortege had reached the 14 July Coffee Shop on the Atlas Streets, the Kurds attacked Turkmen shops and their owners, looting houses and workplaces, and chanting anti-Turkish slogans. Although the massacre had Kurdish nationalist motives, many of the perpetrators had been Arab members of the ICP. In addition to the Kurdish and Arab members of the ICP, many perpetrators of the massacre were part of the Popular Resistance Force (PRF). The PRF was an auxiliary militia of the Iraqi government. The PRF had many ICP sympathizers in its ranks. During the first day of the massacre, 20 Turkmens were massacred and 70 were wounded. The Iraqi army was called in to restore order, although most soldiers were Kurds and refused to fire on other Kurds.

=== 15 July and 16 July ===
The Turkmen tried to seek asylum in the Castel of Kirkuk, however they also were attacked by ICP mortars. During the massacre there were cases of torture. Dwellings and two cinema halls were bombed out.

When the Iraqi army arrived, they declared curfew, during which the execution of Turkmen notables such as Ata Hayrullah, Cahit Fahrettin, and Kasim Nefteci continued. One of the Turkmen witnesses, Kubat Mukhat, stated that "the gunmen, who we had never seen before, opened fire on us in our house with automatic weapons. They killed my two brothers Cihat and Nihat and my sister Emel in front of us. They could not go to hospital due to a curfew, and all of the wounded people died."

According to Henry Astarjian, who described the events as pogrom, had claimed that 50 Turkmen intellectuals were killed and buried alive during the second and third day. The Kirkuk administrations made claims that the number of killed was 32, while another 20 were buried alive. The massacre stopped when the Iraqi army took total control on 16 July.

=== Death toll ===
At first the authorities believed that the number of killed was 120 and 140 were wounded, all Turkmen. Later Qasim claimed that 79 Turkmen were killed, including 40 were buried alive, and 140 were injured. The number of looted Turkmen property was 120.

== Aftermath ==
=== Reaction in Iraq ===
While the Iraqi Communist Party was influential in Iraqi politics, their influence was weakened after the massacre. Mutilated bodies of Turkmens were shown on TV and magazines, criticizing the communists. Due to the politics in Iraq, Abdulkarim Qasim blamed the ICP in general rather than the Kurds. Due to pressure from Qasim, the ICP apologized for the massacre in early August. Qasim used the massacre as an excuse to persecute communists in the Iraqi army. The 26 perpetrators were sentenced to death. Qasim later stated that "even Hulagu and the Zionists did not commit such an atrocity." Jerjis Fathallah, a Kurdish communist and nationalist, later stated that after the massacre, the Turkmen lived in a state of fear for two weeks and rushed to buy Kurdish clothes, with its price increasing by 10 times as a result.

Cultural and linguistic communal consciousness among Iraqi Turkmen thrived under the Qasim regime, which tried building ties with prominent Turkmen amid its crackdown on Kurdish and communist political activities after the 1959 massacre. It was under the auspices of the Interior Ministry under the Qasim regime when the Turkmen Brotherhood Association was founded in 1960. The government allowed them to freely engage in cultural activities but banned them from political activities.

=== Reaction in Turkey ===
The massacre was censored in Turkey. There was a belief among the Iraqi Turkmen that the 1960 coup d'état in Turkey against Adnan Menderes was organized by the Turkish army as a resistance against the censoring of the massacre. However, various Turkish newspapers reported on the event and accused the Turkish government of being passive about the problems of Turkish minorities in other countries, including Iraq.

=== Elsewhere ===
The event was covered by The New York Times. The Moscow radio also covered the event on 20 July, claiming that the perpetrators were a group called Turan, whose goal was to destabilize Kirkuk and Mosul, and make them be part of the Republic of Turkey. Qasim's persecution of communists following the massacre, created worry in the Soviets.

== In culture ==
The massacre greatly influenced Turkmen literature and collective memory; it became central for survival in both cultural and political fields among the community. In collective memory the massacre was an attempt to assimilate the Turkmen, to leave them without leaders and intellectuals.

After the massacre Iraqi Turkmen became influential in politics, resisted pressure to protect their language and culture. For example, the first non-governmental organization of the community (Iraqi Turkmen Culture and Assistance Association) was founded in November 1959; soon it became the representative of the Turkmen in the following years under the Ba'ath regime. A year after Turkmen Teachers organized a training congress to obtain the rights of the community, in 1961 Turkmen magazine Kardashlik was published. An Iraqi Turkmen writer, Ali Marufoglu dedicated his short story City Monsters to the massacre.

Each year the massacre is commemorated on July 14 and the victims are remembered. A monument dedicated to the victims exists in Kirkuk, Mosul and Tal Afar.

== See also ==
- Arabization of Kirkuk
- Ba'athist Arabization campaigns in northern Iraq
- Persecution of Iraqi Turkmen in Ba'athist Iraq
- Turkmen Martyrs' Day
- Erbil massacre
- 1991 Altun Kupri massacre
- Iraqi Turkmen genocide

== Sources ==
- Hazır, Tunahan (2020). Tanıkların gözüyle 14 Temmuz 1959 Kerkük Katliamı (PDF) (Master thesis). Niğde Ömer Halisdemir University. pp. 69–70.
- Öz, Enes (2014). 14 Temmuz 1959 Kerkük katliamı ve katliamın Türk kamuoyundaki yansımaları (Master thesis). Erciyes University.
- Doğan, Soner (2021). "The Massacres Commemorated in Iraqi Turkmen Culture and Political Discourse". Gaziantep University Journal of Social Sciences. 4 (20).
- Pamukçu, Gürkan (2019). "The Roots Of Ethnic Conflict In Kirkuk and The Kirkuk Massacre Of 14 July 1959". Bilge Strateji. 11 (20).
