= Article 140 of the Constitution of Iraq =

Provision on internal territorial disputes

Article 140 of the Iraqi Constitution
- Disputed areas in Iraq according to article 140 of the Iraqi Constitution: Undisputed and part of the Kurdish Regional Government since 1991. Undisputed and under the control of central government. Disputed and part of the Kurdish Regional Government since 1991. Disputed and under the control of central government.

Council of Representatives of Iraq
- Long title: Constitutional provision addressing the status of disputed territories in Iraq
- Citation: Article 140, Constitution of Iraq
- Territorial extent: Disputed territories of northern Iraq, including Kirkuk, Khanaqin, and Sinjar
- Enacted by: Council of Representatives of Iraq
- Enacted: 15 October 2005
- Introduced by: Constitutional Drafting Committee

Related legislation
- Transitional Administrative Law

Summary
- Establishes a framework for resolving the status of disputed territories through normalization, census, and referendum.

Keywords
- Kurdistan Region, Iraq, disputed territories, Kirkuk
- Status: Not yet in force

Article 140 of the Iraqi Constitution (Note: Kurdish: ماددەی ١٤٠ی دەستووری عێراق, romanized: Madey 140î destûrî 'Êraq; Arabic: المادة ١٤٠ من دستور العراق) is a provision that addresses the territorial disputes within Iraq, particularly regarding the status of Kirkuk and other disputed regions. Adopted as part of the 2005 Constitution, the article outlines a three-stage process for resolving these disputes: the normalization of affected areas, the conduct of a population census, and the organization of a referendum to determine their future administrative status. Article 140 aims to address demographic changes from the Ba'ath regime, promoting fair governance and protecting minority rights.

== Background ==
Article 140 was developed in the period following the fall of the Ba'ath regime in 2003, during a time of political transition in Iraq. It emerged as part of efforts to establish a new legal and constitutional framework for the country, aimed at addressing longstanding disputes over territories affected by the previous government's Arabization policies. These policies had altered the demographic composition of several northern provinces, contributing to tensions between the Kurdish population and other ethnic groups. Article 140 sought to provide a legal mechanism to address these historical grievances and promote equitable treatment of affected communities.

The drafting of the 2005 Iraqi Constitution included Article 140 as a late addition, reflecting the contentious nature of territorial governance. The article addressed the status of areas affected by demographic changes resulting from Ba'athist Arabization policies.

These policies shifted the demographic balance in favor of Arab populations and caused large-scale displacement, contributing to a volatile environment that continues to affect Iraqi politics.

As part of the Constitution, the implementation of Article 140 has been delayed and has encountered practical and administrative obstacles. Successive Iraqi governments have not fully carried out their constitutional obligations, resulting in ongoing tensions between the central government in Baghdad and the Kurdistan Regional Government in Erbil. Analysts suggest that the delays are due to the complex nature of the article rather than solely legal obstacles.

== Provisions ==
Article 140 is based on principles established in Article 58 of the Transitional Administrative Law (TAL), which sought to address demographic changes and adjust administrative boundaries in areas including Diyala, Nineveh, and Saladin.

1. Normalization: This step involves reversing policies implemented under the regime of Saddam Hussein, restoring property rights, and allowing displaced individuals to return to their homes.
2. Census: A national census is conducted to assess the demographic composition of the disputed territories, providing a basis for subsequent political decisions.
3. Referendum: Following the census, a referendum is held to determine whether the residents of the disputed territories should be incorporated into the Kurdistan Regional Government or remain under the authority of the federal government in Baghdad.

The original text of Article 140 of the Permanent Constitution of the Republic of Iraq:

- First: The necessary steps must be taken to complete the implementation of all provisions contained in Article 58 of the Transitional Administrative Law of Iraq.
- Second: Full authority for implementation shall be exercised by the federal government, as indicated in Article 58 of the Transitional Administrative Law, continuously and fully, to achieve the results of normalization, census, and a final referendum in Kirkuk and other disputed areas within the specified timeframe ending on 31 December 2007.

== Delays ==
The implementation of Article 140 has faced continual delays since 2006. Although the article was intended to be completed by the end of 2007, even the initial phase was not fulfilled by that deadline. Successive Iraqi governments have not fully met their obligations under the provision, which has prolonged tensions in the disputed areas. During this period, neither the Iraqi government nor the Kurdistan Regional Government assumed full responsibility for the development of Kirkuk.

Political disputes between Erbil and Baghdad have hindered the execution of Article 140, resulting in delays that have persisted for more than a decade. These disputes have involved disagreements over procedures, voter eligibility, and administrative responsibilities, complicating efforts to implement the article effectively.

Legal interpretations of Article 140 have contributed to ongoing uncertainty regarding its implementation. The Federal Supreme Court of Iraq has ruled that the article remains legally binding and must be executed regardless of previous delays. The court has also issued opinions concerning the regulatory framework associated with the article. These interpretations have been invoked by various political actors to support differing positions, leading to continued ambiguity and limited progress in resolving the disputed territories.

=== 2017 referendum ===
The regions mentioned in Article 140 were included in the 2017 Kurdistan independence referendum by the Kurdistan Regional Government as part of efforts to address disputes over their status. The disputed areas covered by Article 140 include districts such as Kirkuk, Makhmur, Khanaqin, and Sinjar. Their participation outside the autonomous region indicated unresolved issues and tensions over Article 140.

The 2017 referendum weakened efforts to implement Article 140, as tensions between Baghdad and the Kurdistan Regional Government led to reduced political will for its enforcement.

== See also ==
- 2023 unrest in Kirkuk
- Kirkuk status referendum
