= Persecution of Iraqi Turkmen in Ba'athist Iraq =

Overview of the persecution of Iraqi Turkmen by the Ba'athist Iraqi government

- Part of the Ba'athist Arabization campaigns in northern Iraq, the Iran–Iraq war, and the prelude to the Iraqi Turkmen genocide
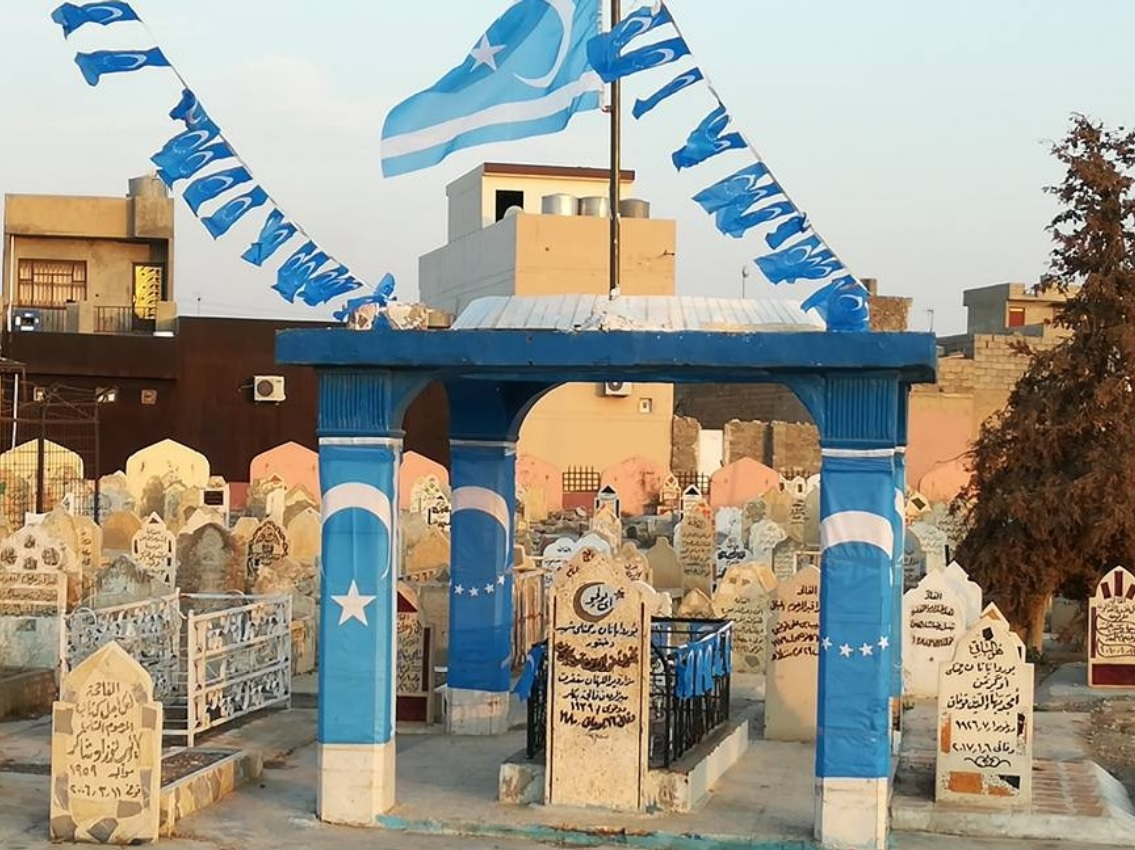
- Grave of Necdet Koçak, a Turkmen intellectual executed by the Iraqi government in 1980 in Baghdad, located in Kirkuk
- Location: Ba'athist Iraq
- Date: 1968–2003
- Target: Iraqi Turkmen
- Attack type: Massacres, Deportations
- Perpetrator: Ba'athist Iraq
- Motive: Anti-Turkish sentiment, Arabization

The Persecution of Iraqi Turkmen in Ba'athist Iraq refers to the persecution of Iraqi Turkmen by the government Ba'athist Iraq, under Saddam Hussein.

== History ==
The 1957 Iraqi census was recognized as the last reliable census before the Arabization policies of the Ba'ath regime. It recorded 567,000 Turkmen out of a total population of 6.3 million. This put them third, behind Arabs and Kurds.

Throughout Ba'athist rule, many Iraqi Turkmen would register as Arabs in order to avoid being targeted. The Iraqi Turkmen had a history of migrating to Turkey in times of crisis dating back as early as the Mosul question. However, due to the intensified political and social repression, the Iraqi Turkmen diaspora in Turkey increased significantly during the Ba'ath period and began to change Turkmen practices in Iraq itself.

Around the same time the government of al-Bakr signed the 1970 accord with the Kurdish rebels, it was making similar gestures toward Turkmen organizations. In January 1970, the Iraqi government issued a resolution recognizing the Turkmen as an ethnic group with language and cultural rights. It referred to Turkmen as "the Turkmen minority" which spoke "Turkmani" rather than Turkish, and it specified seven rights supported by the government, such as the native language classes in primary schools, the translation of school materials, the creation of a union for Turkmen litterateurs, and the growth of Turkmen programming on Kirkuk's local television. The Turkmen Brotherhood Association continued to focus on Turkmen interests but moved in accordance with the Ba'ath regime and praised the developments in minority rights. However, immediately after, the actions of the Ba'ath regime toward Turkmen began to contradict the 1970 Turkmen rights resolution.

The Ba'ath regime intended to dilute the Turkmen identity to be less threatening. They only tolerated the Turkmen language if it was written in the Arabic script and presented as a separate language from the Turkish spoken in Turkey. The Kardeşlik magazine of the Turkmen Brotherhood Association initially published in Arabic and Arabic-script Turkmen, only adding Latin-script Istanbul Turkish in 1964. In 1971, the Iraqi government banned the Latin-script Turkish section. The government began to withdraw many of the freedoms it gave to the Iraqi Turkmen in the 1970 resolution. The hundreds of Turkmen schools which opened in Iraq were closed shortly after. The Turkmen began a three day boycott campaign and held some protests in Kirkuk, with the government arresting and severely torturing 50 of the Turkmen protestors. The government increased pressures on the Iraqi Turkmen. The Turkmen had no relation with the Iraqi state, were not granted loans, were not allowed to work in state offices, and the Turkmen graduates of universities were not appointed to Turkmen districts. In 1972, only 500 of the 10,000 employees in the Kirkuk oil company were Turkmen. In March 1970, the Iraqi–Kurdish Autonomy Agreement gave the Kurds status in the Iraqi constitution. The Iraqi constitution adopted on July 16, 1970, recognized only Arabs and Kurds as the components of the Iraqi nation. As part of the agreement, a plebiscite was needed to find out the boundaries of the Kurdistan Autonomous Region. The plebiscite was planned to be held on October 26, 1970, and required Iraqi Turkmen to pick between the Ba'athist government or the Kurdish government. As the Ba'athist government could not have prevented the Kurds from entering Kirkuk either way, the plebiscite was never held. In 1977, the Revolutionary Command Council took over the editorial committee of the Kardeşlik magazine and significantly diluted its original mission for a communal Turkmen identity. In the same year, the Iraqi government shut down a Turkish cultural center attached to the Turkish consulate in Kirkuk.

By the late 20th century, the Iraqi government had adopted a policy of treating the different ethnicities as formal groups with unitary interests. Various Iraqi governments used the patronage of the Turkmen elite in Kirkuk to counter Kurdish nationalism. While the Ba'ath regime treated Kurds as an intrinsic threat to the state, its stance on Turkmen varied depending on context. The Ba'ath regime actively persecuted Iraqi Turkmen, it was also common for the Ba'ath regime to mention Turkmen alongside Arabs in Kirkuk as a pretext to target Kurds, while Kirkuk was simultaneously Arabized with both Kurds and Turkmen being expelled from the city or being marginalized.

The Turkish Foreign Ministry regarded the Anti-Turkish actions of the Iraqi government as a political matter. Salih Mahdi Ammash, the Vice President of Iraq, visited Turkey on January 16, 1971, for one week, and discussed the situation of the Iraqi Turkmen in the official visit. However, the Ba'athist government intensified its efforts to change the ethnic structure of the Turkmen territories. Local authority of villages and local quarters in big cities was given to Arabs, even in villages where all residents were Turkmen. Arabs were rewarded to settle in Turkmen territories. The Turkmen names of the villages were changed to Arabic. The name of Kirkuk was officially changed to "Al-Tamim" in accordance with the order of Presidency number 41 of January, 20, 1976. Arab settlers in Kirkuk were compensated for their traveling costs, given financial support, and convenient loans for buildings. Turkmen were banned from selling their houses to other Turkmen, but were allowed to sell to Arabs. Arab men were awarded 10,000 IQD (then equal to 33,000 USD) to marry Turkmen women. Turkmen clerics were banned from giving sermons in the Turkmen language and were put under pressure by the government. Turkish President Fahri Korutürk visited Kirkuk on April 27, 1976 during his official visit to Iraq. The Turkmen held a ceremony for him, although once he left, many Turkmen who attended the ceremony were arrested. In 1976, new regulations enclosing especially the Turkmen territories were carried out through the administrative division of the country. Management of all Turkmen social, political, and cultural establishments were given to Arabs. The persecution of Turkmen intensified in 1979 when Saddam Hussein came to power, and was seen as the darkest time period in Iraqi Turkmen history.

Although Hassan al-Bakr was the president from 1968 to 1979, Saddam Hussein had been very active in the government and gave the ideas for many of the policies against the Turkmen. After Saddam Hussein came to power in 1979, the persecution of Iraqi Turkmen intensified. The Turkmen were increasingly pressured to assimilate, and many human rights violations on Turkmen civilians were observed. Turkmen needed government permission to sell property, Turkmen lands were nationalized, Turkmen who had Turkish names or spoke Turkish in state offices were insulted, Turkmen houses were confiscated by force, and Arab settlers increased. Shortly after coming to power, Saddam Hussein ordered the execution of around 70 of the highest Iraqi Turkmen community leaders on January 16, 1980. The most influential were Abdullah Abdurrahman, Riza Demirci, Necdet Koçak, and Adil Şerif. The date was remembered as Turkmen Martyrs' Day. After the executions, the Turkmen neither applied for any official positions nor participated in non-governmental organizations. Many Turkmen also began fleeing Iraq. Mahir Nakip claimed that the reason Saddam Hussein executed the Turkmen community leaders was to see the reaction of Turkey, and upon seeing no reaction, felt free to target Iraqi Turkmen throughout the entirety of his rule. On February 28, 1980, the Turkish Foreign Minister, when asked about the executions, claimed that the Turkish government had expressed the concerns of the Turkish public to the Iraqi government, but the Iraqi government ignored it. He claimed that the Turkmen were Iraqi citizens and that Turkey had no right to intervene in Iraqi affairs. At a Baghdad press conference in 1980, when asked about the executions, Saddam Hussein stated that "these are Iraqi citizens, they committed a crime, they got their punishment. They say they are Turks, so let those people take their bones, do we ever ask what you did to the Arabs in Iskenderun?" In 1976, Arabization policies by the state also intensified. The Iraqi government first banned the Turkish language in 1972. Under Saddam Hussein, in the 1980s, further bans on the Turkish language were made and enforced.

While Iraqi Turkmen were targets of several massacres, such as in 1924, 1946, and 1959, the Iraqi Ba'ath Party was responsible for the massacres on Iraqi Turkmen between 1979 until 2003. Notable massacres included the 1980 executions, the 1991 Altun Kupri massacre, the 1996 Erbil massacre, and the massacres during the Anfal campaign, which had also targeted and killed Iraqi Turkmen despite primarily targeting Kurds. Over 20 Turkmen villages and settlements were depopulated and destroyed by the Iraqi army during the Anfal campaign.

During the Iran-Iraq war from 1980 to 1988, Iraqi Turkmen were heavily conscripted into the Iraqi army and sent to the front lines, and formed a significant part of the Iraqi casualties. The Ba'athist government destroyed thousands of Turkmen houses under the pretext of needing land for military infrastructure. Before the Iran-Iraq war, the Iraqi government generally accused Turkmen of spying for Turkey before executing them, although during the war, it began accusing the Turkmen of spying for Iran. In November 1985, all Turkmen territories, especially Kirkuk, were put under an extensive search operation by the Iraqi army. Turkmen were assaulted, and Arab settlers looted with impunity. The Iraqi constitution adopted on July 7, 1990, only recognized Arabs and Kurds. From 1980 to 1988, Turkey did not accept the formation of any Turkmen organization.

Iraqi Turkmen villages and towns were often destroyed to make space for Arab settlers. Although the Iraqi Turkmen were not always expelled, Arab neighborhoods were established in their settlements, and the demographic balance changed as the Arab migrations continued and the Arab presence expanded. Several presidential decrees and directives from state security and intelligence organizations had specifically focused on Iraqi Turkmen. On May 6, 1980, Iraqi Military Intelligence issued directive 1559, ordering the deportation of Iraqi Turkmen officials from Kirkuk. It instructed the Iraqi Army to "identify the places where Turkmen officials are working in governmental offices to deport them to other governorates in order to disperse them and prevent them from concentrating in this governorate". In addition, on 30 October 1981, the Revolution's Command Council issued decree 1391, with paragraph 13 noting that "this directive is specially aimed at Turkmen and Kurdish officials and workers who are living in Kirkuk". Iraqi Turkmen who remained in their traditional settlements continued to face Arabization policies. School names, neighborhoods, villages, streets, markets, and mosques with Turkic names were changed to Arabic names. Many Iraqi Turkmen villages were demolished without being rebuilt, especially during the 1990s.

During the 1991 Iraqi uprisings, many Turkmen rose against the Iraqi government and joined Iran-backed Shia militias. Many Turkmen also joined the Kurdish rebels when they entered their settlements, as "it was only the fact that the regime in Baghdad was unquestionably worse that persuaded Turkmen to cooperate with the Kurdish national movement." When the Iraqi government began settling Palestinians in Turkmen and Kurdish houses in Kirkuk, Jalal Talabani advised Kurds and Turkmen to put their differences aside and fight to retake their homes.

After the 1991 Iraqi uprisings, the USA established no-fly zones over Iraqi Kurdistan. The no-fly zones had split the Turkmen region, with half being under the no-fly zones under Kurdish authority, and the other half still under Iraqi authority. Turkmen organizations in Iraq were completely banned. Some Turkmen organizations were given asylum in the KRG, but faced restrictions and were sometimes even massacred by the Peshmerga. There was a large wave of Turkmen immigration outside of Iraq. The Turkish government was reluctant to confront the Iraqi government about the persecution of Iraqi Turkmen. Turkey used a divide and conquer policy on the KDP and PUK, although after the Kurdish victory in the 1991 Iraqi uprisings, the United States closely intervened in consolidating Kurdish control of northern Iraq, establishing a no-fly zone and recognizing the autonomous government. After the failure of the Turkish divide and conquer policy, support for the Turkmen began as another method of countering Kurds. Umit Bayat, representative of the Turkmen movement in Turkey, and several other Turkmen officials, claimed that Turkey had long branded itself as the defender of Iraqi Turkmen, but did not confront Saddam Hussein. 21st century Turkish political commentators generally concluded that Turkish support for Iraqi Turkmen was to give the Turkish state a place in Iraqi Kurdish affairs after the Kurds gained official autonomy, which prevented Turkey to freely intervene in Iraqi Kurdistan, leading Turkey to use the safety of Turkmen and presence of PKK as causes for intervention. Furthermore, the government of Turgut Ozal, motivated by the Turkish-Islamic synthesis, only advocated for Sunni Turkmen, completely ignoring Shia Turkmen.

The Ba'athist government, while repressing Iraqi Turkmen, commonly accused Sunni Turkmen of collaborating with Turkey, and Shia Turkmen of collaborating with pro-Iran groups, and arrests of Turkmen civilians were extremely widespread. There was a historically large community of Iraqi Turkmen who adhered to Bektashi Alevism. However, most of them converted to Twelverism due to pressure before Saddam Hussein. Under Saddam Hussein, the remaining Alevi Turkmen were oppressed, and the historic Bektashi tekke in the Tisin neighborhood of Kirkuk was destroyed by the Iraqi army. Many more Alevi Turkmen converted to Twelverism because of the intense pressure under Saddam Hussein, although some remained Alevi.

== Aftermath ==
After the 2003 invasion of Iraq, the cultural repression of Iraqi Turkmen was lifted, and the Iraqi Turkmen played a significant role in the De-Ba'athification and development of Iraq after Saddam Hussein. In 2003, most of the disputed territories of northern Iraq were captured by the Peshmerga, which began a revenge campaign against Arab settlers, ultimately reversing the Arabization of the Kurdish settlements and earning a brutal reputation to the point that Arab settlers would flee as soon as the Peshmerga entered any settlement. In the Shia Turkmen village of Bashir, the Arab settlers remained. The top imam of Bashir claimed that it was because the Turkmen had no armed group, and that the Peshmerga was only interested in Kurdish settlements. The Arabs refused to leave without a court order, after which the Turkmen residents threatened that displaced Turkmen were planning a march back to Bashir in which every Arab that remained in the village would be killed. Before any clashes, the US hosted an agreement which only evicted the undocumented Arabs, though tensions persisted as the documented Arab settlers remained. Sunni Arab vigilante groups eventually began shooting Turkmen returnees in Bashir and sparked clashes, while tensions in other regions were high between Arabs, Kurds, and Turkmen. Iraqi Turkmen, whether Sunni or Shia, viewed Sunni Arabs as oppressive and claimed that Sunni Arabs had not only persecuted Turkmen, but everyone else in Iraq who was not a Sunni Arab.

After the 2003 invasion of Iraq, the ban on the Iraqi Turkmen Front was lifted, and many of its members were elected into the Iraqi government. However, there were sectarian conflicts between Sunni and Shia Turkmen, tensions with Kurds due to the claim of Kirkuk, continued tensions with Arab settlers, and well as problems with the Iraqi government over its refusal to permit Iraqi Turkmen to form their own security force.

After 2003, Ba'ath loyalist and Islamist armed groups continued targeting Turkmen. It was directly connected to the persecution of Turkmen by Saddam Hussein, and continued until 2013, after which the Iraqi Turkmen genocide by the Islamic State began and lasted until 2017.

Although there had been no Turkmen armed groups in Iraq, during the war on the Islamic State, the predominantly Arab militias within the Popular Mobilization Forces, such as Kata'ib Hezbollah, the Badr Organization, and Asa'ib Ahl al-Haq, set up proxy militias and recruited Shia Turkmen. The Shia Turkmen militias rose to power, especially in Tuz Khurmatu, Tal Afar, and parts of Kirkuk, and engaged in a revenge campaign primarily against Sunni Arabs, but also against Sunni Turkmen, until the Iraqi government asserted control and the stability was restored. The Shia Turkmen militias were at the forefront of many human rights abuses attributed to the PMF. The Shia Turkmen militias were practically independent, controlling their own territory and being able to launch their own operations, but nevertheless acted accordingly with the PMF. When they held territory or engaged in operations with the larger PMF militias, they were accused of summary executions, kidnappings, arbitrary detention, torture, looting, and the mass destruction of houses. The Shia Turkmen militias emptied out entire neighborhoods belonging to Sunni Arabs and Sunni Turkmen. According to some human rights groups and local informants, the destruction of Sunni Arab and Sunni Turkmen properties showed patterns of an effort to permanently change the demographics in favor of Shia Turkmen. By March 2018, nearly all the Shia Turkmen of Amirli had returned, but no Sunni Arabs or Sunni Turkmen (an estimated 15,000 families or more), while in the mixed neighborhoods of Tuz Khurmatu, locals estimated that only 5-10 percent of the original Sunni Arab population and 10 percent of the original Sunni Turkmen population remained. Shia Turkmen attacks on Sunni Arabs and Sunni Turkmen were fewer in areas outside of Tuz Khurmatu, as there were even less Sunni Turkmen and Sunni Arabs left there. By March 2018, the Shia Turkmen militias had expelled an estimated 70,000 and prevented them from returning. Throughout the Turkmen regions and especially in Tal Afar, which came under the control of the PMF, tensions increased between the Sunni Turkmen who supported the pro-Turkey political parties, and the Shia Turkmen who supported the pro-Iran militias. The tensions were part of broader tensions between Iran and Turkey. Recep Tayyip Erdoğan threatened Turkish military involvement to protect Sunni Turkmen interests.

== See also ==
- Anti-Turkish sentiment
- Ba'athist Arabization campaigns in northern Iraq
- Human rights in Ba'athist Iraq
