= Destruction of Kurdish villages during the Iraqi Arabization campaign =

Persecution and killing of Kurds in the history of Ba'athist rule of Iraq

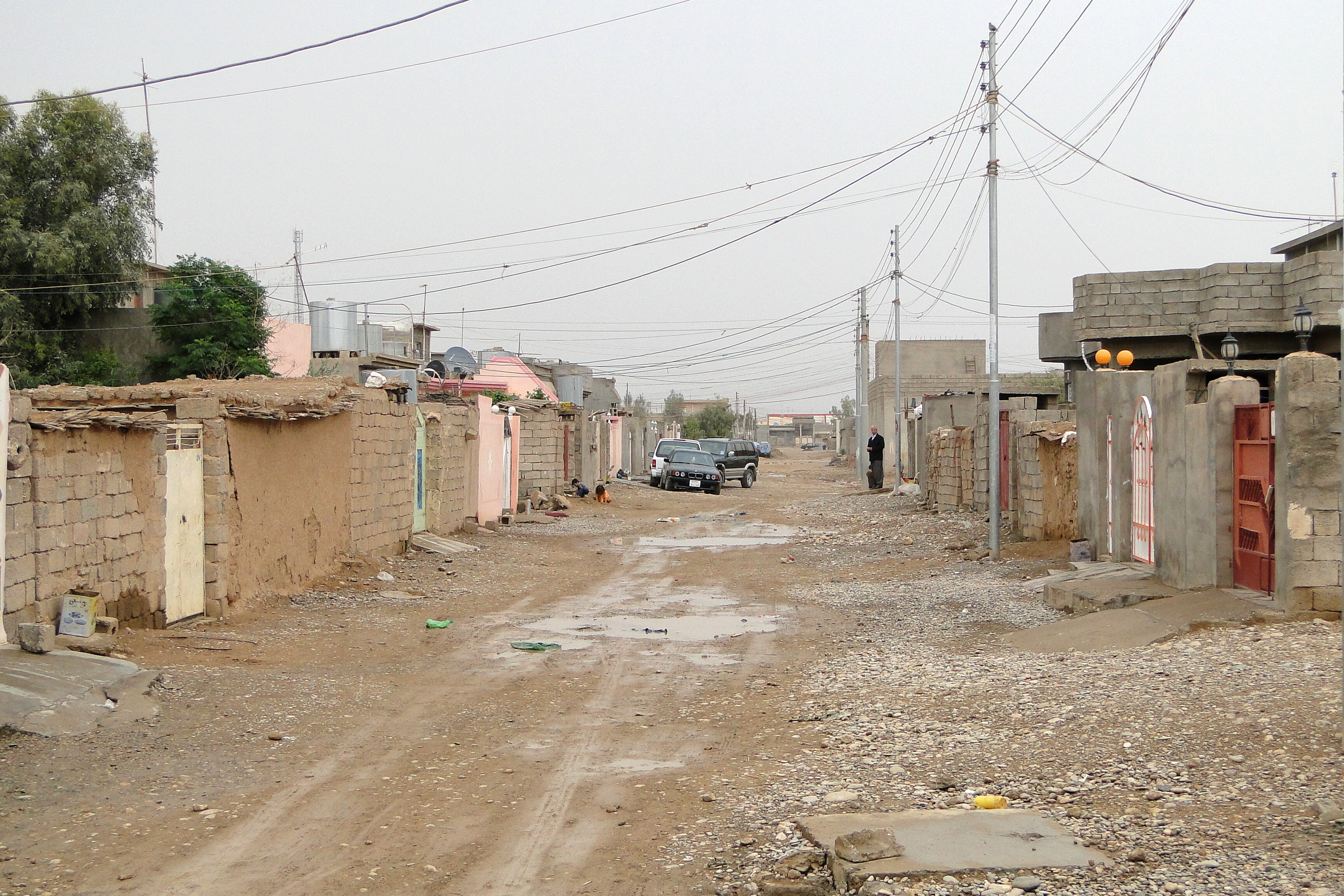
- Street View of Rizgary – Former Sumud Relocation Camp for Anfal Genocide Survivors – Kurdistan – Iraq
- Location: Ba'athist Iraq
- Date: 1975–2003
- Target: Kurds
- Attack type: Genocide, ethnic cleansing, mass murder, deportation, chemical warfare, enforced disappearance, counterinsurgency, starvation
- Perpetrator: Ba'athist Iraqi government
- Motive: Counterinsurgency, Anti-Kurdish sentiment, Arabization

Kurdish villages were razed by the Ba'athist Iraqi government during its "Arabization campaign" of areas excluded from Kurdistan under the Iraqi–Kurdish Autonomy Agreement of 1970.

== History ==
Some 4,000 villages were destroyed from 1975 until the end of the Al-Anfal Campaign in the late 1980s.

During the mid-1970s, hundreds of Kurdish villages were destroyed in the northern governorates of Ninawa and Duhok (Shorsh Resool estimate: 369), and around 150 in Diyala (Shorsh Resool estimate: 154).

In 1977–78, in response to the 1975 Algiers Agreement, Iraq began clearing swaths of land along its northern border with Iran. During the first waves of clearances, residents were given five days to leave their homes and as many as 500 villages were then destroyed, mostly in the As Sulaymaniyah Governorate.

In the spring of 1987, Ali Hassan al-Majid instructed that "no house was to be left standing" in the Kurdish villages of the Erbil plain. Only Arab villages would be spared. On October 17, 1987 a population census was conducted, in which respondents could only choose "Arab" or "Kurdish" as their nationality; anyone who refused to identify as "Arab" (including minorities such as Assyrians, Turkmens and Yazidis) was labeled "Kurdish" regardless of ethnicity, and when the Al-Anfal Campaign was officially launched several months later, all non-Arabs were targeted. The total of Kurdish villages that were destroyed during the 1987–1989 Al-Anfal Campaign is estimated to be 2,000.

1.5 million Kurds were displaced during the 1991 uprisings in Iraq.

=== Major population damaging events ===
- 1970s Ba'athist Arabization campaigns in North Iraq
- 1980s Feyli Kurdish genocide
- 1983 Barzani clan massacre
- 1986–1989 Anfal genocide
  - Halabja chemical attack
- 1991 Kurdish refugee crisis

== Resettlement ==
In late 1991, the international community launched a large-scale project to reconstruct housing in 1,500 of the 4,000 destroyed villages of northern Iraq.

== See also ==
- Iran–Iraq War
- Civil war in Iraq
- Kurdish villages depopulated by Turkey
