= Gavurbağı massacre =

Massacre of Iraqi Turkmen protestors

- Location: Gavurbağı Park, Kirkuk; Kingdom of Iraq
- Date: 12 July 1946
- Attack type: Massacre
- Deaths: 16-20
- Injuries: 30
- Victim: Iraqi Turkmen
- Perpetrator: Iraqi police
- Motive: Anti-Turkish sentiment

The Gavurbağı massacre happened on July 12, 1946, when the Iraqi police opened fire on Iraqi Turkmen rights protestors in Kirkuk's Gavurbağı park. The protestors all worked for the Kirkuk Oil Company.

== Massacre ==
Before the massacre, ethnic Turkmen workers were protesting for their rights. On July 7, 1946, the Iraqi Minister of Economy, Baba Ali Sheikh Mahmud, went to the Ministry of Arshad al-Umari in Kirkuk, pressuring al-Umari to put an end to the protests, one way or another. However, al-Omari could not persuade them to stop protesting, and began using threats and intimidation, which did not work either. Protesting workers responded by gathering in Gavurbağı Park, and then Iraqi police arrived and met them with bullets. 16 workers were killed and 30 injured in the attack.

== See also ==
- 1991 Altun Kupri massacre
- Kirkuk Massacre of 1924
- Kirkuk massacre of 1959
