= Surya, Batifa =

Surya گوندی سوریا
- Village
- Interactive map of Surya
- Location in Iraq
- Coordinates: 37°13′34″N 43°4′19″E
- Country: Iraq
- Region: Kurdistan Region
- Governorate: Duhok Governorate
- District: Batifa
- Time zone: UTC+3 (AST)

Surya (Kurdish: سوریا, romanized: Suriyê) is a village in Dohuk Governorate, Kurdistan Region in Iraq.

== History ==
In 1969, the Ba'athist regime executed 39 men in the village.

In September 2020, clashes between Turkish forces and the PKK occurred in the village, causing both the village and its surrounding areas to catch fire.

In July 2022, the Turkish military shelled the village.
