= Kirkuk status referendum =

Canceled referendum in Iraq

The Kirkuk status referendum was the Kirkuk part of a planned plebiscite to decide whether the disputed territories of Northern Iraq should become part of the Kurdistan Region. The referendum was initially planned for 15 November 2007, but was repeatedly delayed and ultimately never took place.

The referendum was mandated by Article 140 of the Constitution of Iraq. Article 140 required that before the referendum, measures had to be taken to reverse the Arabization policy employed by the Saddam Hussein administration during the Al-Anfal Campaign. Thousands of Kurds returned to Kirkuk following the 2003 U.S. invasion of Iraq. The referendum was to decide whether enough had returned for the area to be considered Kurdish.

Kurdish resentment over the government's failure to implement Article 140 was one of the reasons for the 2017 Kurdistan Region independence referendum, which posed the question, "Do you want the Kurdistan Region and the Kurdistani areas outside the Region to become an independent state?" The referendum led to episodes of Iraqi–Kurdish conflict and the government takeover of Kirkuk.

== The Iraqi Constitution ==
Disputed areas in Iraq according to Article 140: Disputed and part of the Kurdish Regional Government since 1991. Disputed and in part under the control of central government, although this area has diminished since the events of 2014.

Following the invasion of Iraq in 2003 by the United States, the country was under the direct rule of the United States-appointed Coalition Provisional Authority, with advice from selected Iraqi leaders who sat on the Iraqi Governing Council. The IGC approved an interim constitution, the Law of Administration for the State of Iraq for the Transitional Period (Transitional Administrative Law, TAL), which established the framework for the drafting and approval of a permanent constitution.

The TAL included specific clauses providing for the return of and compensation for forced migrants and for the "resolution of disputed territories including Kirkuk" through arbitration:

- A. The Iraqi Transitional Government, and especially the Iraqi Property Claims Commission and other relevant bodies, shall act expeditiously to take measures to remedy the injustice caused by the previous regime’s practices in altering the demographic character of certain regions, including Kirkuk, by deporting and expelling individuals from their places of residence, forcing migration in and out of the region, settling individuals alien to the region, depriving the inhabitants of work, and correcting nationality. To remedy this injustice, the Iraqi Transitional Government shall take the following steps:

- 1. With regard to residents who were deported, expelled, or who emigrated; it shall, in accordance with the statute of the Iraqi Property Claims Commission and other measures within the law, within a reasonable period of time, restore the residents to their homes and property, or, where this is unfeasible, shall provide just compensation.

- 2. With regard to the individuals newly introduced to specific regions and territories, it shall act in accordance with Article 10 of the Iraqi Property Claims Commission statute to ensure that such individuals may be resettled, may receive compensation from the state, may receive new land from the state near their residence in the governorate from which they came, or may receive compensation for the cost of moving to such areas.

- 3. With regard to persons deprived of employment or other means of support in order to force migration out of their regions and territories, it shall promote new employment opportunities in the regions and territories.

- 4. With regard to nationality correction, it shall repeal all relevant decrees and shall permit affected persons the right to determine their own national identity and ethnic affiliation free from coercion and duress.

- B. The previous regime also manipulated and changed administrative boundaries for political ends. The Presidency Council of the Iraqi Transitional Government shall make recommendations to the National Assembly on remedying these unjust changes in the permanent constitution. In the event the Presidency Council is unable to agree unanimously on a set of recommendations, it shall unanimously appoint a neutral arbitrator to examine the issue and make recommendations. In the event the Presidency Council is unable to agree on an arbitrator, it shall request the Secretary General of the United Nations to appoint a distinguished international person to be the arbitrator.
- C. The permanent resolution of disputed territories, including Kirkuk, shall be deferred until after these measures are completed, a fair and transparent census has been conducted and the permanent constitution has been ratified. This resolution shall be consistent with the principle of justice, taking into account the will of the people of those territories.

— Article 58, Law of Administration for the State of Iraq for the Transitional Period

In 2005, a permanent Constitution was approved which referred back to the TAL and set a deadline of the end of 2007 for completion:

- First: The executive authority shall undertake the necessary steps to complete the implementation of the requirements of all subparagraphs of Article 58 of the Transitional Administrative Law.
- Second: The responsibility placed upon the executive branch of the Iraqi Transitional Government stipulated in Article 58 of the Transitional Administrative Law shall extend and continue to the executive authority elected in accordance with this Constitution, provided that it accomplishes completely (normalization and census and concludes with a referendum in Kirkuk and other disputed territories to determine the will of their citizens), by a date not to exceed 31 December 2007.

— Article 140, Constitution of Iraq

In late 2007, the U.N. Special Representative for Iraq negotiated an extension of the deadline for six months. However, the federal parliament decided to refer the matter to the Constitutional Court to rule whether the article was now expired or how it should be implemented.

== Normalisation ==
"We shall accept a solution for Kirkuk worked out by the parties inside the city and oppose any solution imported from outside parties that are enemies to the Kurdish people's experiment."

— Najat Hassan Karim, senior Kurdish politician.

The government of Nouri al-Maliki appointed a "Commission on the Normalisation of the Status of Kirkuk" to implement the terms necessitated by the Iraqi constitution. The Justice Minister, Hashim Abderrahman al-Shibli, a secular Sunni Arab from the secular Iraqi National List coalition was appointed the head. A program of normalisation was to be followed by a census by July 2007 and a referendum in November 2007.

In April 2007, Turkish intelligence sources claimed that Kurdistan President Barzani had "offered bribes to various Iraqi officials" involved in the Commission, including $500,000 to al-Shibli. Turkey claimed that Kurdistan was planning to annex Kirkuk illegally, and that the rights of Iraqi Turkmen would be violated if Kirkuk joined Kurdistan Region.

Shibli resigned as head of the Commission in March 2007, citing disagreements with his own coalition on Kirkuk. Raed Fahmy Jahid, another Sunni Arab from the INL was appointed his replacement in August 2007.

In February 2007, the Commission adopted a controversial plan, which gave Sunni Arabs $15,000 to relocate back to their towns of origin, plus a plot of land in their new home.

In September 2007, it was reported that the normalization program had been bogged down in technical difficulties. The Kurdish parties were reported to have agreed a delay to the timetable for the census and referendum.

== Position of Iraqi parties ==
- Shi'ite Arab parties

The Sadrist Movement called for the referendum to be postponed in June 2007.

Supreme Islamic Iraqi Council: In July 2007 they were reported to have supported a delay.

- Kurdish parties

Massoud Barzani, Kurdistan Democratic Party head has said that a delay of three to four months would be acceptable. In September 2007, a news agency reported that the Kurdish parties had agreed a postponement to May 2008. However, Barzani said that failure to implement the law would "result in real civil war".

- Sunni Arab parties

The Iraqi National Dialogue Front called for a delay in June.

The Iraqi Accord Front proposed a delay in June, by way of an amendment to the Constitution of Iraq

- Turkmen parties

Saadeddin Arkej, the leader of the Iraqi Turkmen Front said in June that they aimed to save Kirkuk as the capital of Iraqi Turkmens or at least earn it a special status.

== International reactions ==
- Turkey – The Turkish government strongly opposed holding of the upcoming referendum in 2007, calling for it to be postponed. Iraqi Deputy Prime Minister Barham Salih said in a statement posted on the internet on 9 December 2006, "The issue of Kirkuk will be resolved in accordance with the Iraqi Constitution Article 140. Consequently, this constitutional question will be resolved by the Iraqis themselves. No one can interfere in that." On 10 December, in a speech made at the International Institute of Strategic Studies in Manama, Bahrain, Turkish Defense Minister Vecdi Gonul warned the Iraqi government against imposing an "unrealistic" future on Kirkuk. Iraqi Foreign Minister Hoshyar Zebari criticized Gonul, saying, "You speak of Kirkuk as if it is a Turkish city. These are matters for Iraq to decide."
- United States – The Iraq Study Group of senior American politicians recommended that the referendum be delayed "to avert communal violence given the very dangerous situation in Kirkuk".
- Iran – Iran called for a delay of two years for political reasons in early November 2007.
- Saudi Arabia – Saudi Arabia reportedly offered the Iraqi Kurdish leaders $2 billion in exchange for delaying the process for ten years.

== Mediation ==
In June 2008 the UNAMI head, Staffan de Mistura recommended that the Akra District and Makhmour District of Ninawa Governorate should be incorporated into Kurdistan but that the al-Hamdaniya area of Ninawa Governorate and the Mandali area of Diyala Governorate be excluded. These recommendations were rejected by the Council of Representatives of Iraq.

== See also ==
- Disputed territories of Iraq
- Arabization
- Arabization of Kirkuk
- Anfal Campaigns
- Iraqi Kurdistan
- Demography of Iraq
