= Persecution of Feyli Kurds in Ba'athist Iraq =

Genocide and persecution of the Feyli Kurds under Saddam Hussein's regime

Persecution of the Feyli Kurds in Ba'athist Iraq
- Part of Ba'athist Arabization campaigns in northern Iraq, the Iraqi–Kurdish conflict, and the Iran–Iraq War
- Date: 1963–2003
- Target: Feyli Kurds
- Attack type: Genocide, Forced deportations, Mass killing
- Victims: Estimated 150,000–500,000 denationalized and deported, 10,000–20,000 disappeared
- Perpetrator: Ba'athist Iraq
- Motive: Anti-Kurdish sentiment (mainly), Anti-Iranian sentiment, Anti-Shi'ism, Arab nationalism

The persecution of Feyli Kurds in Ba'athist Iraq was the state-sponsored persecution of the Feyli Kurds in Ba'athist Iraq. The persecution started with the beginning of Ba'athist rule in 1963 and continued until the collapse of the Ba'athist government in 2003. In 2011, the Iraqi Parliament voted to recognize the persecution of Feyli Kurds by the Ba'athist government as a genocide.

== Background ==
Feyli Kurds were often labelled as Iranian, with issues tracing as early as the Iraqi monarchy in the 1920s when they were first refused Iraqi nationality, as the government viewed them as mostly immigrants from Iran. The 1924 Iraqi Nationality Law only considered descendants of Ottoman subjects as "original" Iraqis with automatic nationality, and relegated the Feyli Kurds to the category of foreign descendants, specifically Iranian, and had to apply for citizenship and were treated as second-class citizens despite many having been in Iraq for hundreds of years. These distinctions later enabled harsher persecution after the Ba'athists came to power in 1963. When the Jews of Iraq fled to Israel in 1947, most of their businesses were taken over by their Feyli Kurdish employees. It had dramatically changed the status of Feyli Kurds in Iraq, although the economy was again dominated by a minority whose background sharply differed from the Sunni Arab ruling class, and by the early 1950s, the traditional resentment of Jews had shifted over to the Feyli Kurds. Nevertheless, a Feyli Kurd was appointed to the Baghdad Chamber of Commerce in the 1960s, and in the 1970s, many Feyli Kurds had become leaders in the Kurdish national movement in Iraq and were crucial in the financing of the movement.

Under the first republican regime after 1958, some Feyli Kurds were naturalized, but the rest were refused Iraqi nationality. Abdulkarim Qasim had given Iraqi citizenship to thousands of Feyli Kurds. By the time the Ba'athists were in power, most Feyli Kurds were Iraqi citizens or permanent residents. The Ba'athist government targeted the Feyli Kurds due to their membership of a collective group. After 1963, when Abdulkarim Qasim was overthrown, the Ba'athist government immediately began targeting the Feyli Kurds, under the pretext that they had Iranian origin, with Iran being traditionally seen as an enemy in Iraq. The government created narratives of Feyli Kurds being aggressors from outside and immediately began creating laws which affected the Feyli Kurds. Moreover, the Feyli Kurds had actively resisted the Ba'athists during the 1963 coup, creating more animosity towards them.

The Ba'athist government had feared the potential of the Feyli Kurds if the government was weakened, as they were both Kurds and Shias, and the principal traders of Iraq. Their loyalty was also suspected. They were mainly targeted for being Kurds, with their alleged Iranian background only having been the official justification. Before the Ba'athist era, most Feyli Kurds were involved in politics, in which they supported either the Kurdistan Democratic Party or the Iraqi Communist Party. Since Iraqi independence, successive governments had failed to resolve the nationality issue of the Feyli Kurds, and despite occasional small-scale deportations, they were largely left alone before the Ba'athist period.

== Persecution ==
During the Ramadan Revolution, the Feyli Kurds in Baghdad immediately took to the streets and tried to stop the Ba'athist tanks from advancing on the Ministry of Defence. Ba'athist authorities contacted the KDP headquarters in Baghdad asking them to convince the Feyli Kurds to stop fighting, which eventually happened. However, the Ba'athists "never forgot that episode of rebellion" from the Feyli Kurds who were the "only remaining group standing against the Ba'athists" after 1963. Later in 1963, the Ba'athist government added Article 19 of the Citizenship law, stating "the Minister may withdraw the Iraqi citizenship from a foreigner who has acquired it or if he attempted to do anything is considered as a threat to state security or its safety." According to the article, the Feyli Kurds fell under the category of those who acquired Iraqi citizenship.

After the 17 July Revolution, the second Ba'athist coup in 1968, the campaigns against the Feyli Kurds intensified, and they were targeted everywhere. In 1970, they further intensified and began needing legal justifications. One of the justifications was the Iraqi Temporary Nationality Act No. (21) of 1968, in which Article 20 stated that "an Iraqi nationality is determined by the law and shall not be dropped from Iraq who belongs to the Iraqi families and was living in Iraq before 6 August 1924 and have been enjoying the Ottoman nationality and chose the Iraqi pastoral", and that "it is possible to withdraw the citizenship from naturalized citizens in cases specified by the nationality act." This justified the withdrawal of Iraqi nationality for those who had non-Ottoman nationality before 1924, considering the Feyli Kurds as foreigners or Iranian dependents. The "central report of the 9th regional Conference of the Baath Party" criticized Mohammad Reza Pahlavi for terminating the Convention of 1937 in April 1969, calling him a "threat to the sovereignty of Iraq". They also criticized his support for Barzani, and portrayed the Feyli Kurds as Iranian residents in Iraq conspiring against the government. The Feyli Kurds had been dehumanized and demonized to justify the process and gain public support for it. Around 70,000 Feyli Kurds were registered for deportation in 1969, 1970, and 1971. Justifications included officially classifying them as Iranian and as "traitors" of Arab nationalism, the "fifth column of Iraq", as aides to Iranian and Zionist operations inside Iraq, as vile and profane, and as a contamination of Iraqi blood.

One of the demands of the Kurdish rebels during the First Iraqi–Kurdish War was the naturalization of the Feyli Kurds, which Abdul Salam Arif refused, and the Iraqi government did not change its policy on the Feyli Kurds even after the Iraqi-Kurdish Autonomy Agreement of 1970. As part of the agreement, the KDP nominated Habib Mohammad Karim, a Feyli Kurd, for vice president of Iraq, although the Ba'athist government refused, alleging that he was of Iranian origin and had family in Iran, and demanding that the Kurds nominate someone else. Shortly after the agreement was signed, the Iraqi government expelled thousands of Feyli Kurds from Iraq and launched a new Arabization campaign. Eventually, the Second Iraqi–Kurdish War broke out. The rejection of Habib Karim, the preferred candidate among Kurds, as well as the continued targeting of the Feyli Kurds after the agreement was signed were some of the factors which led to the breakdown of the agreement. When Mustafa Barzani left for Iran in 1975, many Feyli Kurds switched to other Kurdish groups, primarily the PUK. During this time, the Feyli Kurds generally supported the Kurdish nationalist groups, or the SCIRI, in which they had representatives. The deportation of the Feyli Kurds continued from 1969 to 1980. Feyli Kurds were mainly targeted in Baghdad, Basra, and Amarah. Most of the community was impacted by the deportations.

After the 1979 Iranian revolution, the Iraqi tensions with Iran increased, and the Ba'athist government targeted the Feyli Kurds again. In addition to Feyli Kurds, the Iraqi Persians and some Shia Arabs were regarded as a fifth column and deported. The Feyli Kurds and the Iraqi Persians were the most affected by the deportations. Shia Turkmen were deported to Iran alongside Feyli Kurds throughout the 1970s and 1980s. There was formerly a small Lur population in eastern Iraq, near the Feyli Kurds, although around 1975 they underwent a large-scale migration to Iran due to political factors. As many as 90% of Iraqi deportees to Iran in the 1980s were Feyli Kurds.

In April 1980, the Islamic Dawa Party attempted to assassinate Tariq Aziz at Al-Mustansiriya University in Baghdad, in retaliation for a March decree declaring "membership of Dawa [to be] a capital offense." The perpetrator, Samir Mir Ghulam, was of Feyli Kurdish origin, which was used by the Ba'athists as the official justification for the Revolutionary Command Council to issue decree No. 666 on April 7, 1980, depriving Iraqis of foreign origin the right to citizenship. It was part of a wider series of events amid increasing tensions which led to the outbreak of the Iran–Iraq War a few months later. After the decree, Feyli Kurdish properties were seized by the Iraqi government. They were either forced to march across the Iranian border or remained in Iraq as non-citizens. Many of the families that were deported to Iran were highly educated and successful or held positions in the government. In 1980, Iraqi citizens were offered 10,000 IQD (around 30,000 USD at the time) to divorce their Feyli Kurdish spouses, who were deported to Iran afterwards.

Many Feyli Kurds in the borderlands saw the Iran–Iraq War as an opportunity of independence. They had also organized resistance against the Iraqi government through militias and other groups. Feyli Kurds were an important part of the Iraqi opposition groups that emerged in Iran, and some of them had significant political and security influence in Iraq after 2003. The Fayli Kurdish Muslim Movement, based in Ilam, was founded on March 21, 1981 by Abduljalil al-Fayli and his associates, with the aim of politically mobilizing the Feyli Kurds in Iran, where they made up the majority of Iraqi exiles and deportees. The group had a Shia orientation, but also a strong nationalist orientation, with its founder Abduljalil al-Fayli being a former KDP activist, and the group being aware that Feyli Kurds leaned towards nationalism more than religion. The "Faili Kurds Homepage" also operated online as a religious faction from 1997-2005.

While Iran accepted the Feyli Kurdish deportees, they continued to face many difficulties, mainly because they were not part of the Iraqi Shia opposition groups supported by Iran. While in Iran, many of these families lived in camps and were denied access to work, education and travel documents. They were even unable to register births, deaths and marriages. Their persecution by both governments created a considerable Feyli Kurdish diaspora in Baghdad and Tehran. Furthermore, Iran forcibly repatriated many Feyli Kurds to Iraqi Kurdistan throughout the 1990s. During the Iraqi Kurdish Civil War, the Iran-backed IMK fought against both the PUK and KDP, aiming to create an Islamic state, in which they specifically targeted Feyli Kurdish refugees in killings, abductions, and forced returns.

== Aftermath ==
According to UNHCR, at the beginning of 2003, there were more than 200,000 Iraqi refugees in Iran, 1,300 living in Azna, of whom 65% were Feyli Kurds. After the 2003 invasion of Iraq, the official state persecution of Feyli Kurds came to an end, and their situation began to improve in terms of politics, security, and society. Many of them returned to Iraq and worked to recover from their losses. Previous laws targeting the community were lifted, and some of them received compensation to some extent. In total, throughout the Ba'athist period, estimates for the Feyli Kurds denationalized and deported ranged from 150,000 to 500,000, while estimates for disappeared men who were never recovered ranged from 10,000-20,000. Feyli Kurds sometimes benefitted from their Shia religion as it helped some of them find jobs. After 2003, many Feyli Kurds rose to significant positions in Iraq, including Fuad Hussein, a prominent statesman, and Muhsin Al-Mandalawi, who became deputy speaker of the Parliament of Iraq and was influential in De-Ba'athification, as well as Aras Habib Karim, who was affiliated with the INC and Ahmed Chalabi. Aras Habib became notorious after 2003 and it was known in Baghdad that he and his men used the seized Ba'athist documents to track and kill many senior Ba'athists. Aras Habib was later raided by the CIA along with Ahmed Chalabi in May 2004 on suspicion of spying for Iran.

The new Iraqi government took steps to restore their rights, with the 2005 Iraqi constitution recognizing the Feyli Kurds and their persecution, and a nationality law in 2006 which repealed Decree 666 and allowed denaturalized Iraqis to regain citizenship, although the Feyli Kurds continued to face other problems. At one point, the Iraqi government claimed that over 100,000, or 97% of Feyli Kurds denaturalized by the Ba'athists had their citizenship restored, although the UNHCR and other observers noted that it never released proper statistics. The Iraqi Minister of Immigration stated that between April 2003 and April 2013, 16,580 Feyli Kurds had their nationality reinstated and 6,853 had national identification documents, although it was estimated that at least 150,000 Feyli Kurds were denaturalized during the Ba'ath era. The Property Claims Commission, which was established to resolve Ba'ath era disputes after the fall of Saddam Hussein, was often reported to be inefficient and incapable. The Iraqi government also made Law No. 16 of 2010 on Compensation for Persons Affected by the Ba’ath Regime, although there was little progress in implementing it. Furthermore, many of the Feyli Kurds who regained their identity documents were issued different documents from other Iraqis, labelling them as having foreign Iranian origin. By 2009, around 100,000 remained undocumented.

In 2010, the Supreme Iraqi Criminal Tribunal sentenced Mizban Khadr al-Hadi, Aziz Saleh Al-Numan, and Saadoun Shakir to death, and sentenced Tariq Aziz and Ahmad Husayn Khudayir as-Samarrai to 10 years each for their role in the persecution of Feyli Kurds during the Ba'athist period, which in October 2011, was recognized as a genocide by the Iraqi Council of Representatives. Despite its official recognition, some believed the persecution did not meet the criteria of ethnocide or genocide.

== See also ==
- Anfal genocide
- Halabja chemical attack
- Dujail massacre
