= 1924 Kirkuk massacre =

1924 massacre in Iraq

Kirkuk Massacre
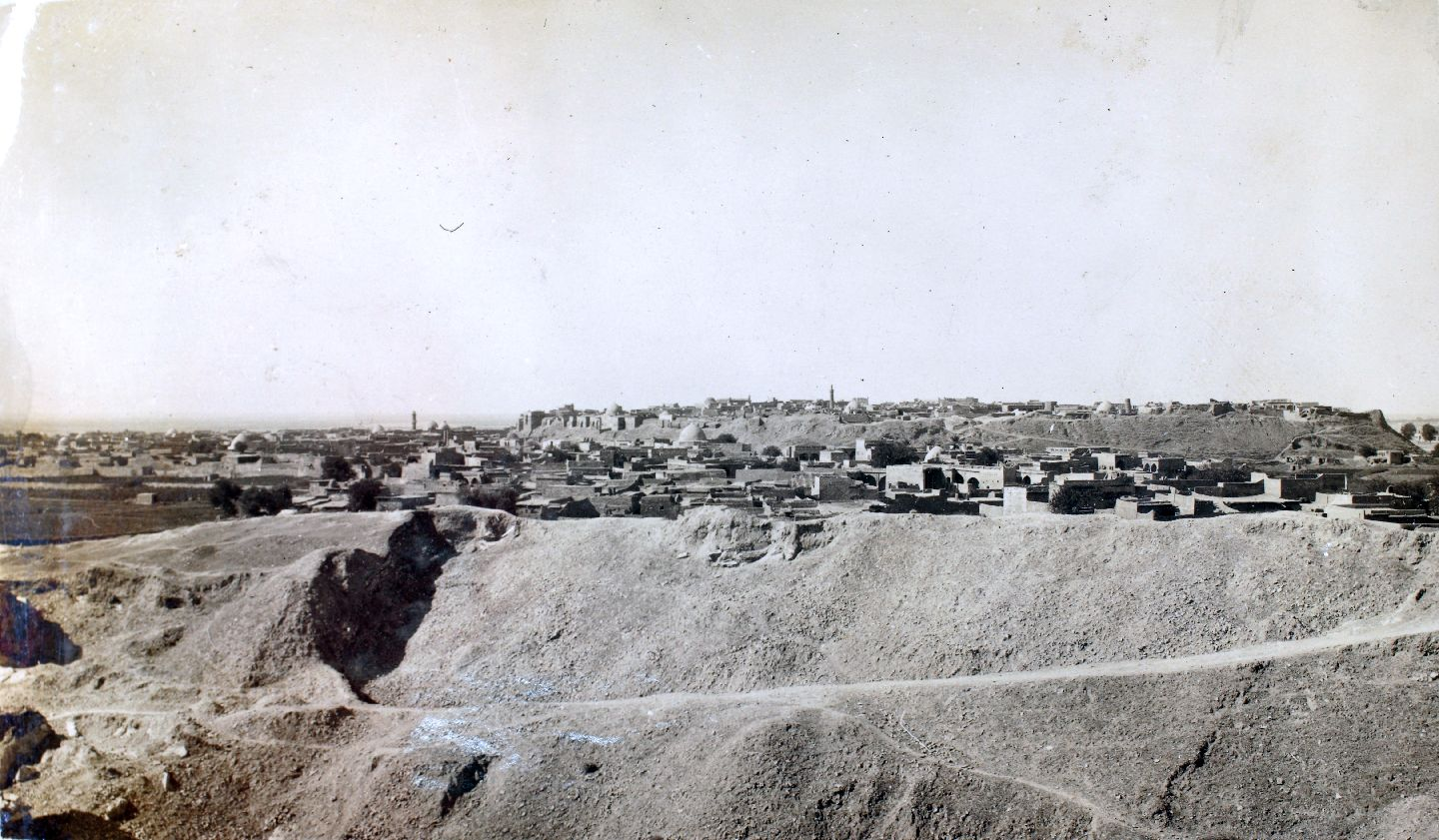
- The old part of Kirkuk, where the massacre took place

- 1924 Kirkuk massacre (Iraq)
- Location: 35°28′N 44°24′E; Kirkuk, Mandatory Iraq
- Date: May 4, 1924
- Target: Iraqi Turkmen, Kurds and Arabs
- Attack type: Shooting, Mass shooting, Mob violence, Looting
- Weapon: Rifles
- Deaths: 300+
- Perpetrators: Assyrian levies, Tyari

The Kirkuk Massacre of 1924 was a massacre perpetrated against the Muslim people of Kirkuk by the Assyrian Levies on May 4, 1924 following a series of attacks initiated against the Assyrian people after their settlement in Iraq. One notable attack which led to hostility between the Assyrians and Muslims was in August 1923 in Mosul, when two Assyrian children were killed by Muslims and no one was brought to justice.

In early 1924 the British deployed the Assyrian levies to Kirkuk province in order to capture the city of Sulaymaniyah, which was controlled by Kurd Sheikh Mahmud. The Kurds in Kirkuk threatened to attack Assyrian women as soon as the Assyrian Levies left Kirkuk to Sulaimanya.

On 4 May, an argument broke out between a Yezidi levy and an Iraqi Turkmen shopkeeper in Kirkuk's central market over prices which led to physical fighting. After the dispute, two more Assyrian Levies were wounded by angry mobs after they were hit from behind with heavy sticks during a dispute. The Turks were also taunting the Assyrians stating, "Now that half of you have gone to Chamchamal; we are not frightened of you." According to British documents, "Two Assyrian battalions then went back to the town, on the way they savagely assaulted a number of innocent Turkish civilians sitting in coffee shops, destroying furniture and beating the customers." This was done after Turks in the shop were making remarks towards the Assyrians who were passing by which started a riot between the Assyrians and Turks. The Turks and a minority of Kurds of Kirkuk then began shooting at the Assyrians which resulted in several Assyrian deaths. The Assyrians Levies returned fire on the armed mobs which resulted in 300+ Muslims being killed. The total number of Assyrians killed was 5.

== See also ==
- Iraq Levies
- Gavurbağı massacre
- 1959 Kirkuk massacre
