= Turkmen Martyrs' Day =

Turkmen Martyrs' Day is an annual memorial day celebrated to commemorate the execution of Iraqi Turkmen intellectuals by Saddam Hussein's regime on January 16, 1980.

== Overview ==
It is celebrated every year in the graves of the victims. Many Turkmen organizations as well as Atatürk's own Turkish Hearths have expressed condolences for the day.

== The intellectuals ==
The Iraqi government arrested and executed 70 Iraqi Turkmen leaders. The most prominent were:

- Abdullah Abdurrahman, the first one to be killed, was born in 1915 in the Biryadi district of Kirkuk. He completed his primary, secondary and preparatory education in Kirkuk. In 1938, he graduated from the Military Academy with the rank of lieutenant. He founded the "Turkmen Brotherhood Club" in 1961, was elected the club's president in 1963, and gathered young Turkmen activists, including writers, intellectuals, scientists and businessmen, for their national role and struggle for Turkmeneli. As soon as Saddam Hussein came to power in October 1979, there was a crackdown on the Turkmen Brotherhood Club, and their leaders were arrested on charges of treason and disloyalty to Iraq. Abdulrahman was executed on January 16, 1980. Before his execution, he was tortured in prison to the point of losing his sight. He was tried by the Revolutionary Court, which was known to be very biased, and sentenced to death by hanging under Articles 157 and 47, 48 and 49 of the Criminal Code, and all his property was confiscated and given to the government.
- Necdet Kocak was born in 1939 in Kirkuk. He completed his primary education in the schools of Kirkuk, completed his doctoral degree at Ankara University at the Faculty of Agricultural Machinery and Mechanical Engineering, and returned to Kirkuk after completing his doctoral studies in Ankara. He worked as an engineer and was appointed as the head of the Faculty of Mechanical Engineering at the University of Baghdad and was awarded by the President of the Republic of Iraq for his competence and scientific achievements in this field. His colleagues knew him as an honest, upright, kind-hearted, scholarly and patriotic man. Dr. Necdet Kochak constantly led Turkmen students and youth, and encouraged them to fight the Iraqi government for their rights. He was executed on January 16, 1980. He was buried in Kirkuk.
- Riza Demirchi was born in Kirkuk in 1926. He completed his primary and secondary education in Kirkuk, and his university education in Ankara. He holds a Ph.D. in Agricultural and Forestry Engineering. After completing his university education, he returned to Iraq. Returning to Iraq with the spirit of patriotism and nationalism, he encouraged the Turkmen youth to love each other, to love their homeland and people, and to be proud of their Turkmen mother tongue. He was one of the founders of the Turkmen Brotherhood Club and was a member of the board for several years. Riza had three sons, Mahmoud, Said, Aslan, and a daughter, Okler, all of whom were university graduates and lived in Istanbul, Turkey. Riza Demirchi was arrested by Iraqi security forces in July 1979 and died under torture. His body has not yet been handed over to his family. He is said to have been thrown into a pool of acid, one of the Saddam regime's most common torture methods against dissidents. For this reason, January 16, 1980, is assumed to be the day of his death.
- Adil Sharif was born in Kirkuk in 1930, engaged in trade and free trade, and was a leading businessman. His voice earned him a strong popularity in Turkmen society. Abdullah Abdurrahman, the first one to die, even said that "there is no mother who can give birth to a hero like Adil Sharif", during one of their meetings before the executions. He was arrested by the security forces on February 28, 1979, and after spending 11 months in security prisons, on Tuesday January 15, 1980, the General Directorate of Security in Baghdad addressed Adil Sharif's brother: "Tomorrow, Wednesday morning, Abu Ghraib prison, you must appear." Abu Ghraib was a torture prison used by Saddam's government. After receiving the news, his brother and some friends went to Abu Ghraib prison and met with Adil Sherif, and other Turkmen intellectuals, which they said had all become unrecognizable. Adil Sharif was executed along with other intellectuals on January 16, 1980, for opposing Saddam's regime and fighting for the rights of the Turkmen people. He was buried in Baghdad because the Iraqi security forces did not allow him to be buried in Kirkuk to prevent his influence from reaching any Turkmen.

== See also ==
- Persecution of Iraqi Turkmen in Ba'athist Iraq
