= 1996 Erbil massacre =

1996 army assault on the Iraqi Turkmen Front

Erbil massacre
- Part of the Iraqi Kurdish Civil War, the Ba'athist Arabization campaigns in northern Iraq, and the Persecution of Iraqi Turkmen in Ba'athist Iraq
- Location: Erbil, Iraqi Kurdistan
- Date: August 31, 1996
- Target: Iraqi Turkmen
- Attack type: massacre, Summary executions
- Weapons: Guns, tanks, Artillery and Helicopters
- Deaths: 48 executed
- Victims: 31 arrested
- Perpetrator: (Ba'athist Iraq) Iraqi Armed Forces
- Motive: Anti-Turkish sentiment, retaliation against political dissidents

The 1996 Erbil massacre happened during raids on the Iraqi Turkmen Front in Erbil by the Iraqi Armed Forces, and the killing of 48 people and 700 opponents of Saddam regime and the arrest of 38, on August 31, 1996.

== Background ==
Iraqi forces withdrew from Iraqi Kurdistan following the victory of Kurdish rebels during the 1991 Iraqi uprisings. Kurdish authorities, especially the Kurdistan Democratic Party, which controlled Erbil, had given asylum to the Iraqi Turkmen Front and Iraqi National Congress, and permitted them to operate within the region and open Turkmen schools, causing the ITF to have a significant presence in the city.

== Massacre ==
The massacre occurred during the heat of the Iraqi Kurdish Civil War, in which Iraqi Armed Forces entered Erbil after KDP leader Masoud Barzani sent a letter to Saddam Hussein asking him for assistance in fighting Jalal Talabani and pushing the PUK out of Erbil. Saddam Hussein sent 45,000 soldiers on August 31, 1996. While Barzani did not order the massacre, nor mention Iraqi Turkmens, the Iraqi forces took the invitation as a chance to punish Iraqi Turkmen political dissidents who fled Ba'athist rule, and raided over 30 buildings owned by the ITF, and 38 Turkmen schools and cultural centers, arresting 38 and taking 48 to an unknown location before executing and burying them. The KDP likely ignored the massacre as they did not want to upset the Iraqi forces and lose the Iraqi armed support against the PUK.

=== Other attacks ===
On the same day, the KDP had captured 13 PUK forces in Erbil and mercilessly executed them, and Iraqi troops also executed 700 PUK and Iraqi National Congress fighters on the outskirts of Erbil. Iraqi troops later withdrew after returning Erbil to the KDP, and the KDP pushed the PUK all the way to the Iran–Iraq border, where the United States intervened to prevent another massacre, and evacuated over 6,000 PUK fighters from Iraq. The KDP took the PUK stronghold of Sulaymaniyah although the PUK took it back in October.

== Aftermath ==
In 2018, Aydın Maruf, a leader of the Iraqi Turkmen Front, said that the armed forces of the Ba'athist regime of Saddam Hussein had executed 48 Turkmen without trial, and stated that "the previous phase of Iraqi history witnessed many attempts to obliterate the Turkmen presence politically, culturally and socially in the country." Imdad Bilal, the leader of the Erbil branch of the Iraqi Turkmen Front, said that after the collapse of the Ottoman Empire, many Iraqi regimes practiced policies of pressuring Iraqi Turkmen and seeking to eliminate their identity.

In 2022, the Iraqi Turks Association stated "on the 26th anniversary of the Erbil Massacre, we commemorate our martyrs, who marched to martyrdom for the sake of the homeland, nation, flag, and freedom, with respect, love and longing. May their souls rest in peace, may their place be heaven."

In 2022, Arshad al-Salihi stated "more than a quarter of a century, exactly 26 years ago, the Turkmen genocide took place in Erbil, the city of Gökböri. We commemorate our heroes who were martyred in the 31 August 1996 Erbil Turkmen Genocide, one of the most painful events in our recent history, with respect and mercy."
