= 1991 Altun Kupri massacre =

Massacre in Iraq

Coordinates: 35.7533°N 44.1436°E

Altun Kupri massacre
- Part of the Persecution of Iraqi Turkmen in Ba'athist Iraq
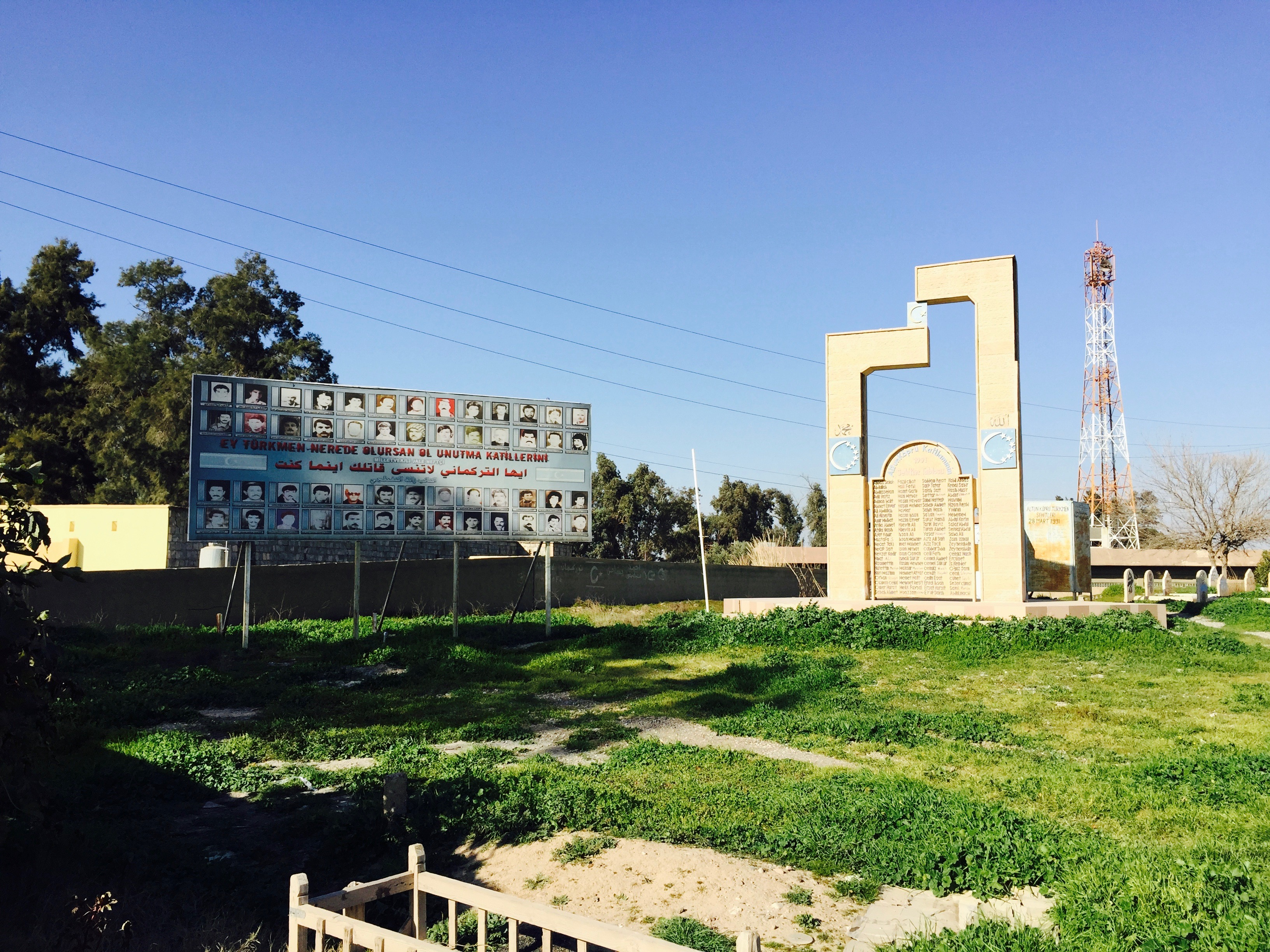
- Location: Altunkupri, Kirkuk Governorate, Iraq
- Date: 28 March 1991
- Attack type: Massacre
- Deaths: 100-250
- Victim: Iraqi Turkmen
- Perpetrator: Iraqi Army (under the Ba'athist government of Saddam Hussein)
- Motive: Anti-Turkish sentiment, Arabization

The Altun Kupri massacre (Turkish: Altınköprü Katliamı, Arabic: مذبحة التون کوبري) occurred on 28 March 1991 in the Turkmen town of Altun Kupri, Kirkuk Governorate, Iraq. The massacre targeted Turkmens, in particular males, both children and adults alike, and was organized by security forces affiliated with Saddam Hussein's army. It came as a result of curbing the 1991 uprising in the dissident areas in the north and south of the country.

== Background ==
Shortly after the Iraqi army retreated from Kuwait, a series of popular uprisings began in the north and south. This came as a direct result of the perception that Saddam Hussein and his leadership had become weakened by the adventurism in Kuwait and in part by the losses during the Iran–Iraq War. Saddam Hussein quickly ordered his troops and other loyalist to curb the uprising leading to a brutal crackdowns with many civilian losses. Altun Köpru in the north, was among the cities which Kurdish rebels had overrun in their quest for the oil-rich disputed city of Kirkuk, and for this reason a direct target for Iraqi security forces. The Turkmens also organized uprisings in the areas of Turkmeneli, with their own motives, and expressed their opposition to the Saddam regime, but were not as militarily active as the Kurds. Following the withdrawal of the Kurdish insurgents an authority gap was present, and forces loyal to Saddam Hussein began to target everyone they suspected of affiliation with the uprisings. Tuz Khurmatu, another Turkmen majority town south of Kirkuk, also experienced a similar massacre of Turkmens.

The Kirkuk area is famed for its people knowing all three languages i.e., Arabic, Kurdish and Turkmen, and its people are not foreign to marriages between each other. The relationship between Turkmens and Kurds has historically been strong and they have lived side by side, but experienced difficulties after a three day long purge in 1959, killing an estimated 20 Turkmen residents by Kurdish Iraqi communist party members. Turkmen familiarity with the Kurds, their own uprisings, and other aspects such as being disregarded by the Baathist Iraqi government and generally disliked due to their Ottoman heritage played a central role for the reason the Saddam regime wanted to eradicate the Turkmens in his pan-Arabist Iraq. Saddam Hussein loyalist saw this as a threat they could not risk taking and decided that all males in Altun Köpru constituted a danger. People in Altun Köpru, knowing Saddam Hussein's brutal methods dealing with dissidents, started to flee but a small percentage of mostly Turkmen men decided to stay oblivious of what was waiting them.

== The massacre ==
=== March 28, 1991 ===
Thursday, the 9th day of Ramadan (March 28, 1991), forces loyal to Saddam Hussein began to locate all male citizens of Altun Köpru and round them up. The orders were that all male, indiscriminate of age should all be round up, and taken by military vehicles to an undisclosed site near the cemetery in Dibis District for execution. Many of the males were fasting due to the holy month of Ramadan. Being round up along a naturally occurring pit they were shot with automatic rifles and subsequently pushed inside the pit which was filled with dirt and thus becoming a mass grave. The troops were later partly withdrawn and the town regained a calm of military activities.

== Aftermath ==
Residents that initially had fled, began to return, and on April 17, the second day of Eid al fitr, a shepherd who had witnessed the atrocity came forth and told about what he had witnessed. Some youths were escorted by the shepherd to the site that he claimed was the site of the mass grave of their relatives and after digging they were eventually convinced. The corpses had started to rot and were mostly unidentifiable but clothes and shoes left on the bodies gave an indication of who each individual was. The first day these youths managed to bring back three corpses and it was decided that they would all be buried in Altun Köpru at a cemetery that would later be known as "Sehitler Mezarlığı" (The Martyrs Cemetery). Over the days all corpses had been retrieved and buried properly in this cemetery.

A commemoration is held at the site of The Martyrs Cemetery each anniversary, that attracts a majority of the residents in Altun Körpu together with high ranking political figures within the Turkmen community.

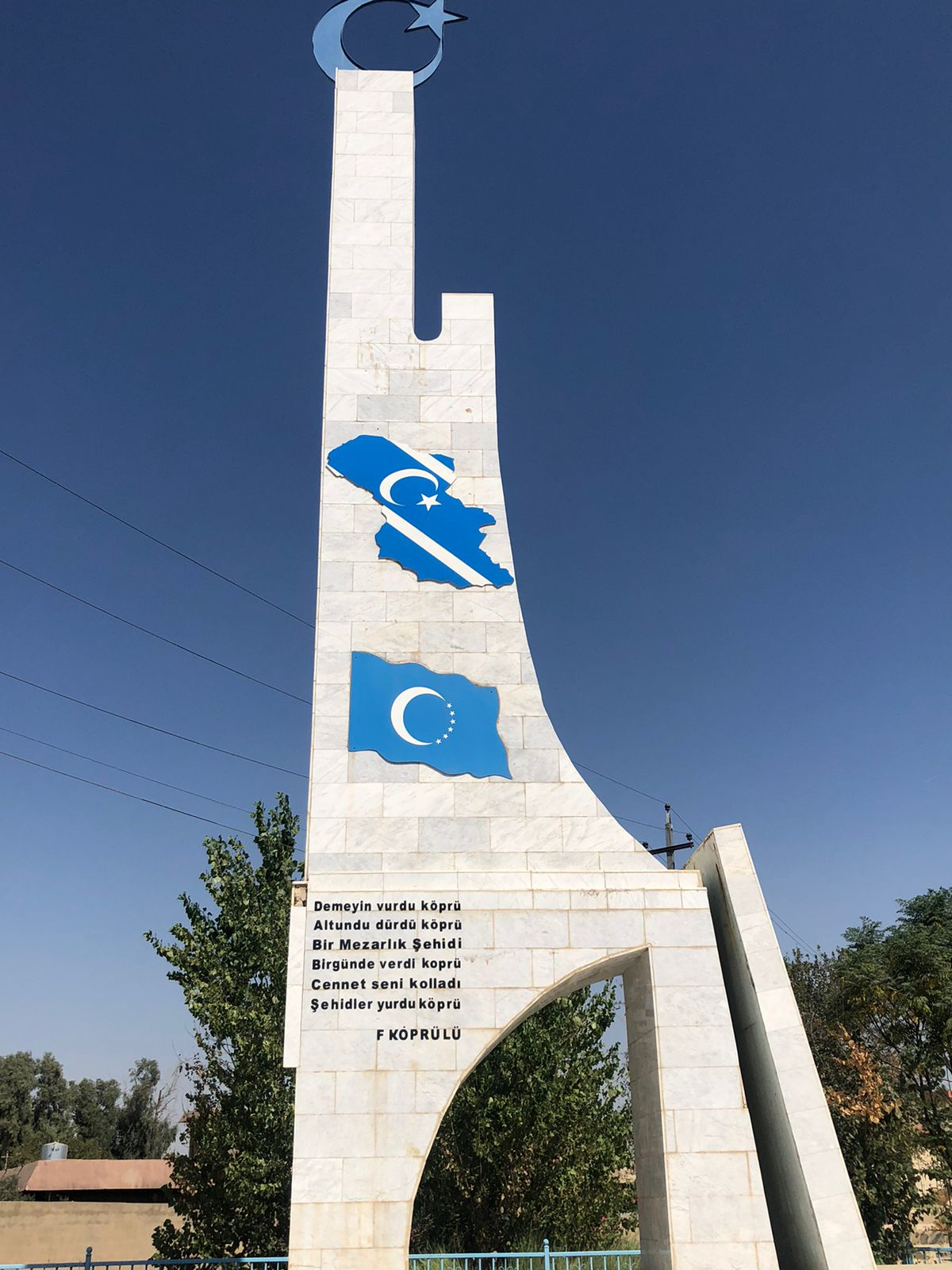
A monument dedicated to the martyrs

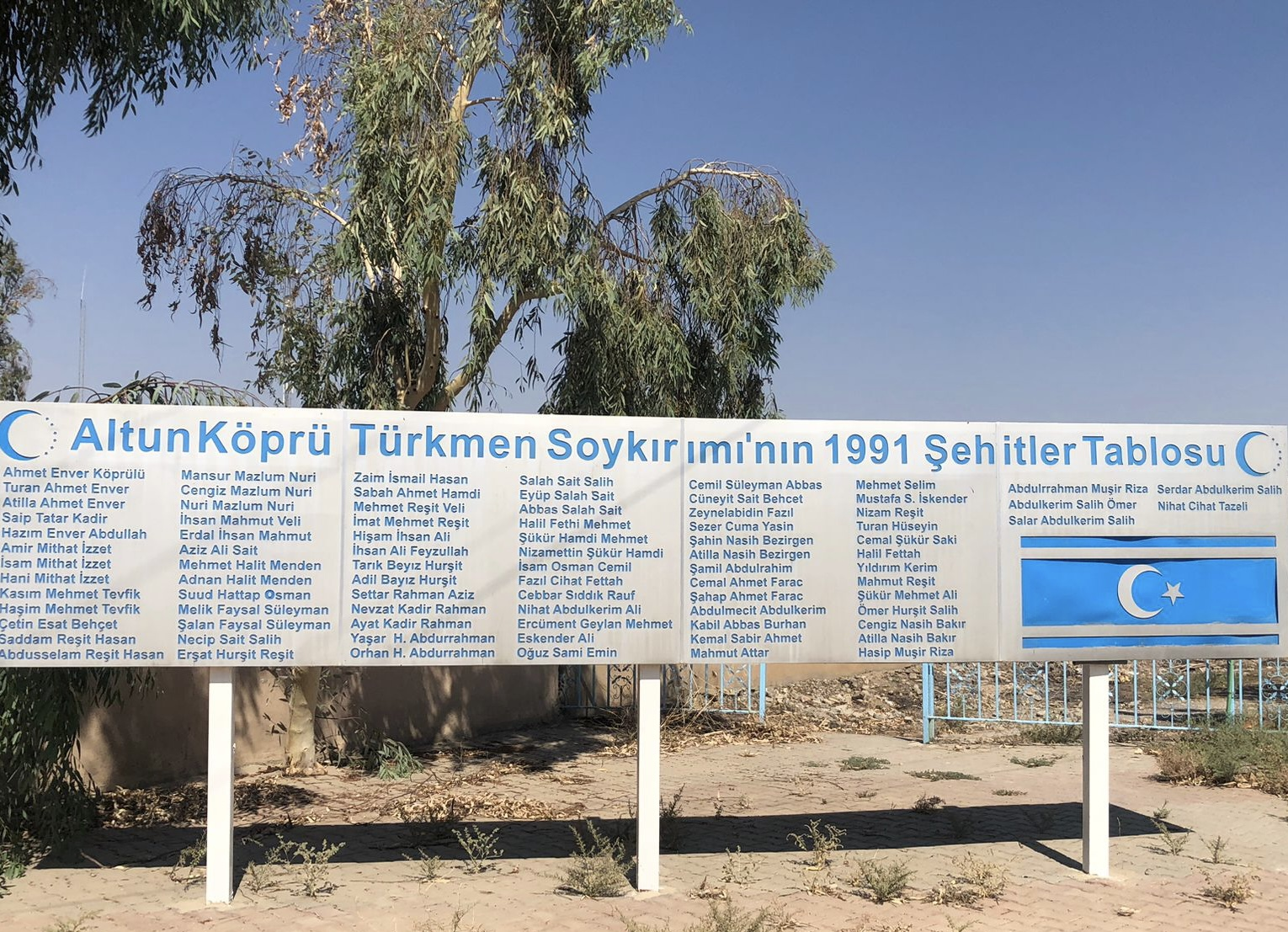
A sign with the names of the martyrs who fell victim during the Altun Kopri massacre in 1991

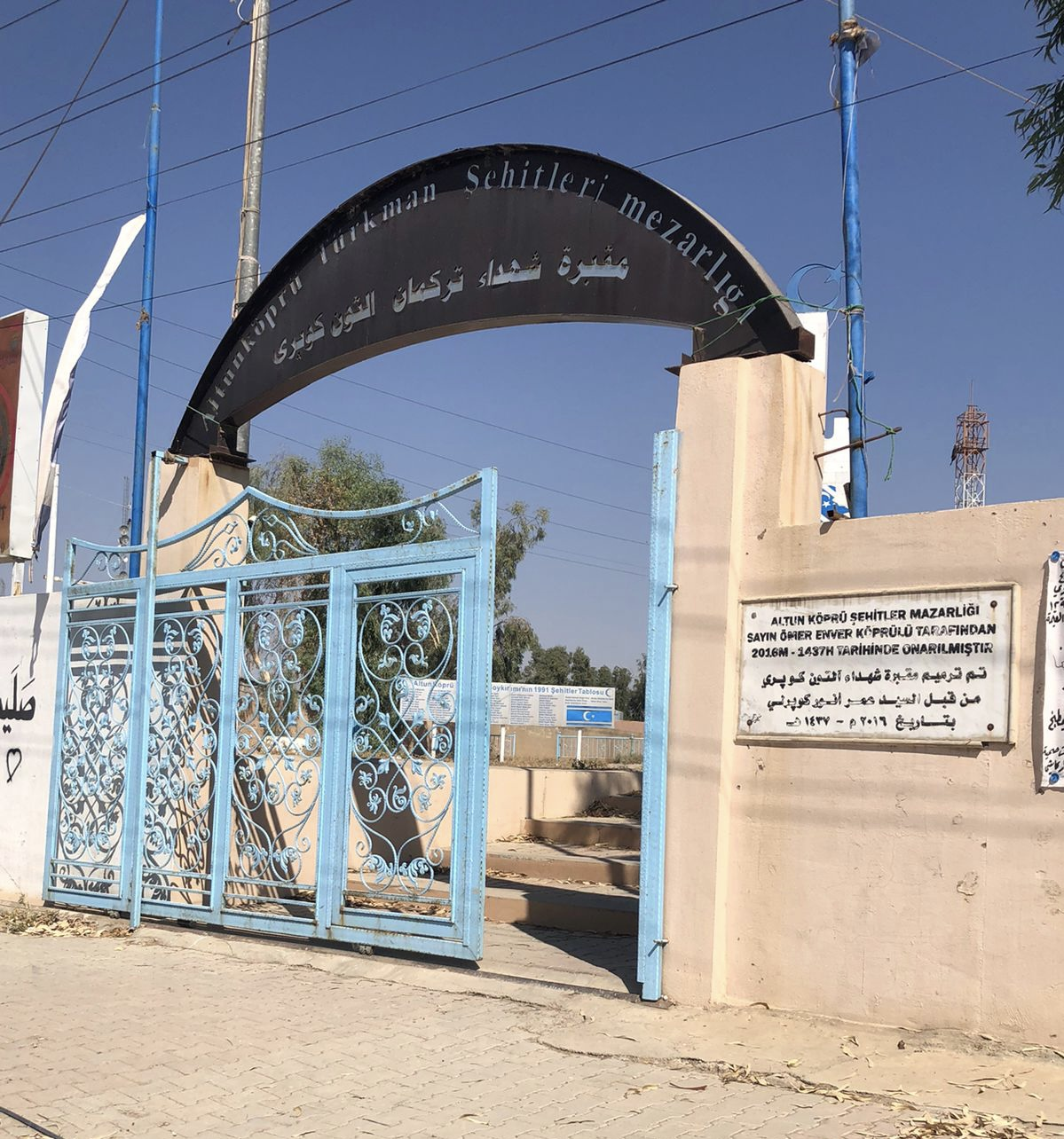
The entrance to the burial site
