= Ba'athist Arabization campaigns in northern Iraq =

Ethnic cleansing of non-Arabs in Iraq (1968–2003)

- Part of Ba'athism, and the Iraqi–Kurdish conflict,
- Map that includes the present Kurdistan Region of Iraq and roughly defines so called "disputed territories"
- Location: Ba'athist Iraq
- Date: 1968–2003
- Target: Mainly Kurds, but also Turkmen, Yazidis, Assyrians, Shabaks, Armenians.
- Attack type: Demographic engineering via ethnic cleansing
- Deaths: 2,500 to 12,500
- Victim: 2,000,000+ (incl. refugees)
- Perpetrator: Arab Socialist Ba'ath Party
- Motive: Arab nationalism and pan-Arabism

Between 1968 and 2003, the ruling Arab Socialist Ba'ath Party of the Iraqi Republic perpetrated multiple campaigns of demographic engineering against the country's non-Arabs. While Arabs constitute the majority of Iraq's population as a whole, they are not the majority in all parts of northern Iraq. In an attempt to Arabize the north, the Iraqi government pursued a policy of ethnic cleansing, killing and forcefully displacing a large number of Iraqi minorities—predominantly Kurds, but also Turkmen, Yazidis, Assyrians, Shabaks and Armenians, among others—and subsequently allotting the cleared land to Arab settlers. In 1978 and 1979 alone, 600 Kurdish villages were burned down and around 200,000 Kurds were deported to other parts of Iraq.

As a part of the Iraqi–Kurdish conflict, the campaigns represent a major chapter of the historical ethno-cultural friction between Arabs and Kurds in the Middle East. Rooted in the doctrines of Ba'athism, the Iraqi government policy that served as the basis of these campaigns has been referred to as an example of internal colonialism—more specifically described by Ghanaian-Canadian scholar Francis Kofi Abiew as a "colonial 'Arabization' program" consisting of large-scale deportations of Kurds and forced Arab settlement within the country.

== Background ==
The Arabization campaigns in northern Iraq were rooted in the Baʿath Party's ideology of Arab nationalism and were closely linked to Baghdad's attempts to secure contested borderlands and suppress Kurdish demands for autonomy, particularly during and after the Iran Iraq War (1980-1988).

These policies intensified under the rule of Saddam Hussein, particularly in areas such as Kirkuk and other oil-rich regions of northern Iraq.

The Yazidis, the Shabaks and the Assyrians are minorities in Iraq and historically were concentrated in northern Iraq, and they are still sizeable populations there in the early 21st century, in line with more prominent ethnic groups of Kurds, Turkmen and Arabs.

Under the Iraqi Hashemite monarchy as well as the subsequent Republican regime, Yazidis were discriminated against: measures applied included the loss of land, military repression and efforts to force them into the central state's struggle against the Kurdish National Movement.

== Policies ==
=== Depopulation of non-Arab territory for Arab settlement ===
From early 1979, under Saddam Hussein, both Kurds and Yazidis were confronted with village destruction, depopulation and deportation. Kurdish displacement in the North in the mid-1970s mostly took place in Sheikhan and Sinjar regions but also covered an area stretching from the town of Khanaqin. The repressive measures carried out by the government against the Kurds after the 1975 Algiers Agreement led to renewed clashes between the Iraqi Army and Kurdish guerrillas in 1977. In 1978 and 1979, 600 Kurdish villages were burned down, and around 200,000 Kurds were deported to the other parts of the country.

Arabization concentrated on moving Arabs to the vicinity of oil fields in northern Iraq, particularly the ones around Kirkuk. The Ba'athist government was also responsible for driving out at least 70,000 Kurds from the Mosul’s western half, thus making western Mosul into all Sunni Arab. In Sinjar, in late 1974, the former Committee for Northern Affairs ordered the confiscation of property, the destruction of the mostly Yezidi villages and the forced settlement into 11 new towns with Arab placenames that were constructed 30–40 km north or south of Sinjar, or other parts of Iraq. There were 37 Yezidi villages destroyed in the process and five neighbourhoods in Sinjar Arabized in 1975. The same year, 413 Muslim Kurd and Yezidi farmers were dispossessed of their lands by the government or had their agricultural contracts cancelled and replaced by Arab settlers. In Sheikhan in 1975, 147 out of a total of 182 villages suffered forced displacement, and 64 villages were handed over to Arab settlers in the years following. Seven new towns were built in Sheikhan to house the displaced Yezidi and Kurdish residents of Arabized villages.

As part of the Al-Anfal Campaign, during the Iran–Iraq War, Saddam's regime destroyed 3,000 to 4,000 villages and drove hundreds of thousands of Kurds to become refugees or be resettled across Iraq, as well as Assyrians and Turkmen. Some 100,000 people were killed or died during the al-Anfal campaign, which is often equated to ethnic cleansing and genocide. The forced campaign of Arabization also attempted to transform the multi-ethnic city of Kirkuk, with a Turkmen plurality, into an Arab majority city.

The Ba'athist government allegedly settled Palestinians in Kurdish and Turkmen homes, which gained more attention when Jalal Talabani spoke on it, calling for Kurds and Turkmen to put their differences aside to reclaim their homes. It was denied by Palestinian journalists in Iraq.

In the 1990s, the distribution of land to Arab settlers was resumed and continued until the fall of the Ba'ath regime, in 2003.

=== Cultural and political Arabization ===
Language limitations, formal identification registration, and census procedures were all part of Arabization. Yezidis were compelled to register as Arabs in the 1977 and 1987 Iraqi censuses, and in 1977, some Muslim Kurds were also compelled to register as Arabs. Scholars have linked the 1977 census result showing an Arab plurality in Kirkuk to broader state efforts to present the area as predominantly Arab.

Additionally, the use of the Kurdish, Turkmen, and Aramaic language in official transactions and education was restricted by the Ba'athist regime. The al-Jinsiya national identity registry was established in the 1970s and encouraged non-Arabs to register as Arabs through "ethnic identity correction." This registration could give access to categories of government employment and property rights that were available only to Arabs.

=== Legal basis for the campaigns ===
The legal basis for Arabization was the Revolutionary Command Council's Decree (RCCD) No. 795 from 1975 and the RCCD No. 358 from 1978. The former authorized the confiscation of property from members of the Kurdish National Movement, and the latter allowed invalidation of property deeds belonging to displaced Muslim Kurds and Yezidis, the nationalization of their land under the control of the Iraqi Ministry of Finance and the resettlement of the region by Arab families.

The Iraqi government utilized these legal decrees to consolidate displacement after using military force and intimidation to depopulate Kurdish towns. Agricultural land was nationalized as Iraqi state property, and property deeds belonging to displaced Kurds were invalidated, frequently with little to no compensation. Arab farmers and their families were then relocated to areas that had previously been Kurdish.

== After the 2003 invasion of Iraq ==
=== Kurdish resettlement and Kurdification ===
After Saddam's fall, many Kurdish families settled in Kirkuk. These policies of Kurdification by the KDP and PUK after 2003 aimed to reverse the previous trends of Arabization. This has prompted inter-ethnic problems with non-Kurds, especially Assyrians and Turkmen.

=== Property claims after 2003 ===
The status of property transferred or occupied under Ba'athist policies was one unresolved effect of Arabization after 2003. In northern Iraq, conflicting claims arose over houses, farms, and agricultural land, particularly as returning displaced people sought to reclaim property that had been seized by Arab settlers. Some Arab settlers in towns like Khanaqin and Sinjar, as well as cities like Kirkuk and Mosul, claimed that they had property documents to houses that had been occupied during prior expulsions.

In order to handle property claims related to confiscations during the former regime's Arabization policy, the Iraq Property Claims Commission was founded in January 2004. Later that year, the system had not yet been put into action, and in order to prevent additional displacement, property restoration was still dependent on impartial and fair procedures. Paperwork, hearings, site visits, appeals, and eviction procedures hindered the Commission's ability to decide restitution cases related to confiscations under Arabization. The Commission was eventually renamed the Commission for the Resolution of Real Property Disputes. After four years of operation, the Commission had received 140,000 claims and taken 41,000 decisions, but fewer than 10 percent of enforceable decisions had resulted in restitution of property to returnees or compensation to current occupants upon eviction.

Wider political conflicts over Kirkuk and other contested territory continued to be linked to property restitution. Many Kurdish internally displaced people moved to Kirkuk between 2003 and 2008, but they frequently just returned "on paper" to file claims for compensation. Few Arab settlers left Kirkuk at the same time, which added to the city's overcrowding and made attempts to undo the effects of Arabization more difficult.

=== Kirkuk status referendum (2007) ===
The Kirkuk status referendum is the Kirkuk Governorate part of a plebiscite that will decide whether the multi-ethnic regions within Iraqi governorates of Diyala, Kirkuk, Saladin and Nineveh will become part of the Iraqi Kurdistan region. The referendum was initially planned for 15 November 2007, but was delayed first to 31 December, and then by a further six months. The Kurdish Alliance emphasized that the delay was for technical and not for political reasons. As the election was not called by early December 2008, it was postponed again as part of the deal to facilitate the regional elections on 31 January 2009. No fresh date has yet been set.

Article 140 of the Constitution of Iraq states that before the referendum is carried out, measures should be taken to reverse the Arabization policy employed by the Saddam Hussein administration during the Al-Anfal Campaign. Thousands of Kurds returned to Kirkuk following the 2003 invasion of Iraq. The referendum will decide whether enough have returned for the area to be considered Kurdish.

== See also ==
=== Related to Human Rights in Ba'athist Iraq ===
- Human rights in Ba'athist Iraq
  - Destruction of Kurdish villages during the Iraqi Arabization campaign
  - Persecution of Iraqi Turkmen in Ba'athist Iraq
  - Anfal campaign
    - Halabja massacre
  - Erbil massacre

=== Legal Proceedings ===
- Trial of Saddam Hussein

=== Further reading ===
- A Modern History of the Kurds (1996)
- Simpson, George L. (2025). "US Policy and Saddam Hussein's Arabization of Iraqi Kurdistan, 1975–1979". The Journal of the Middle East and Africa. 16 (3): 225–268. doi:10.1080/21520844.2025.2500762. ISSN 2152-0844.
