= Great Mosque of the Citadel =

Mosque inside the Kirkuk Citadel

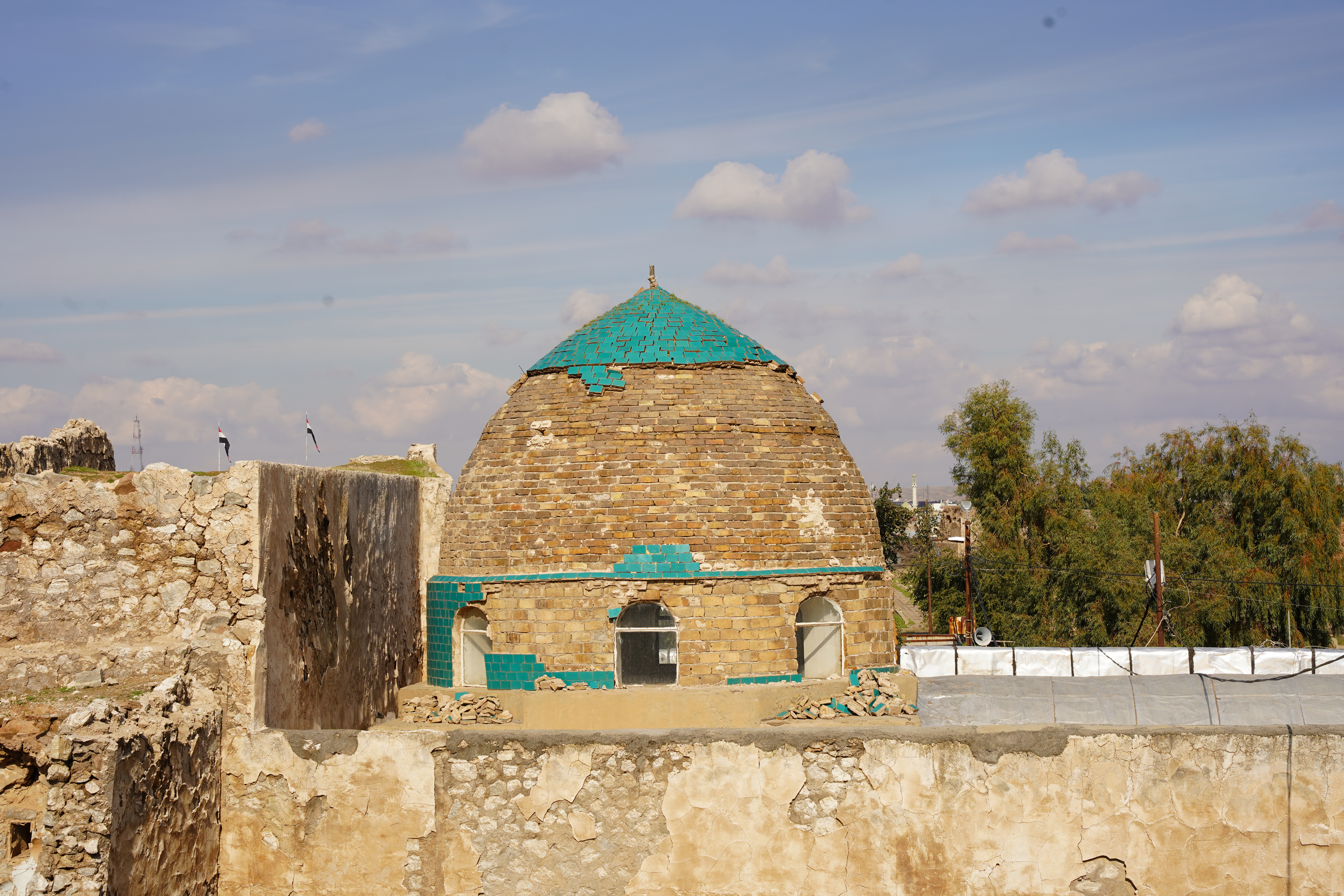
- The dome of the mosque as seen in 2026.

- Location in Iraq

Religion
- Affiliation: Sunni Islam

Location
- Location: Ulu Camii, Kirkuk, Kirkuk Governorate, 36001, Iraq
- Country: Iraq
- Coordinates: 35.4689391°N 44.3947025°E

Architecture
- Type: Mosque
- Style: Seljuk architecture
- Completed: 1237

Specifications
- Dome: 1
- Minaret: 1

The Great Mosque of the Citadel (Arabic: الجامع الكبير في القلعة, Turkish: Ulu Cami Kalesi) is a mosque located within the premises of the Kirkuk Citadel in Kirkuk, Iraq. Formerly a church converted into a mosque in the early 13th century, the present day structure is a 1237 reconstruction from the Seljuk period.

== History ==
The original building was a church built in the 7th century that was dedicated to the Virgin Mary. At the beginning of the 13th century, the Abbasids repaired the church and converted it into a mosque for the growing Muslim populace, known as the al-Adra Maryam Mosque. The Seljuks rebuilt the mosque in 1237, remaining it to the Great Mosque and added a single brick minaret to the mosque complex, while a madrasa was added in 1657 by the Ottomans. During the Ba'athist period in Kirkuk, the mosque was abandoned and entered a dilapidated state, which prompted botched restoration works to be done to the mosque and surrounding buildings between 1998 and 2003. Due to armed conflicts in Kirkuk as well as structural issues that threatened the safety of worshippers, the mosque frequently closed and reopened its doors to the public during this time period, until 2026 when it was officially permanently reopened for the Islamic month of Ramadan. The Great Mosque has also been labelled an official heritage site of Kirkuk along with the Blue Dome and the Prophet Daniel Mosque, as part of the wider Kirkuk Citadel complex.

== Architecture ==
The Great Mosque is built in the Seljuk architectural style. It has a rectangular layout, consisting of the main prayer hall and classrooms, as well as a facility for ablution. A blue dome tops the main prayer hall of the mosque, while a small concrete staircase at the side of the hall leads to a secluded musalla. The courtyard of the mosque serves as a garden, with several walkways allowing for easier access to the classrooms in the mosque. The minaret of the mosque is unfinished and in a ruined state.

== Gallery ==
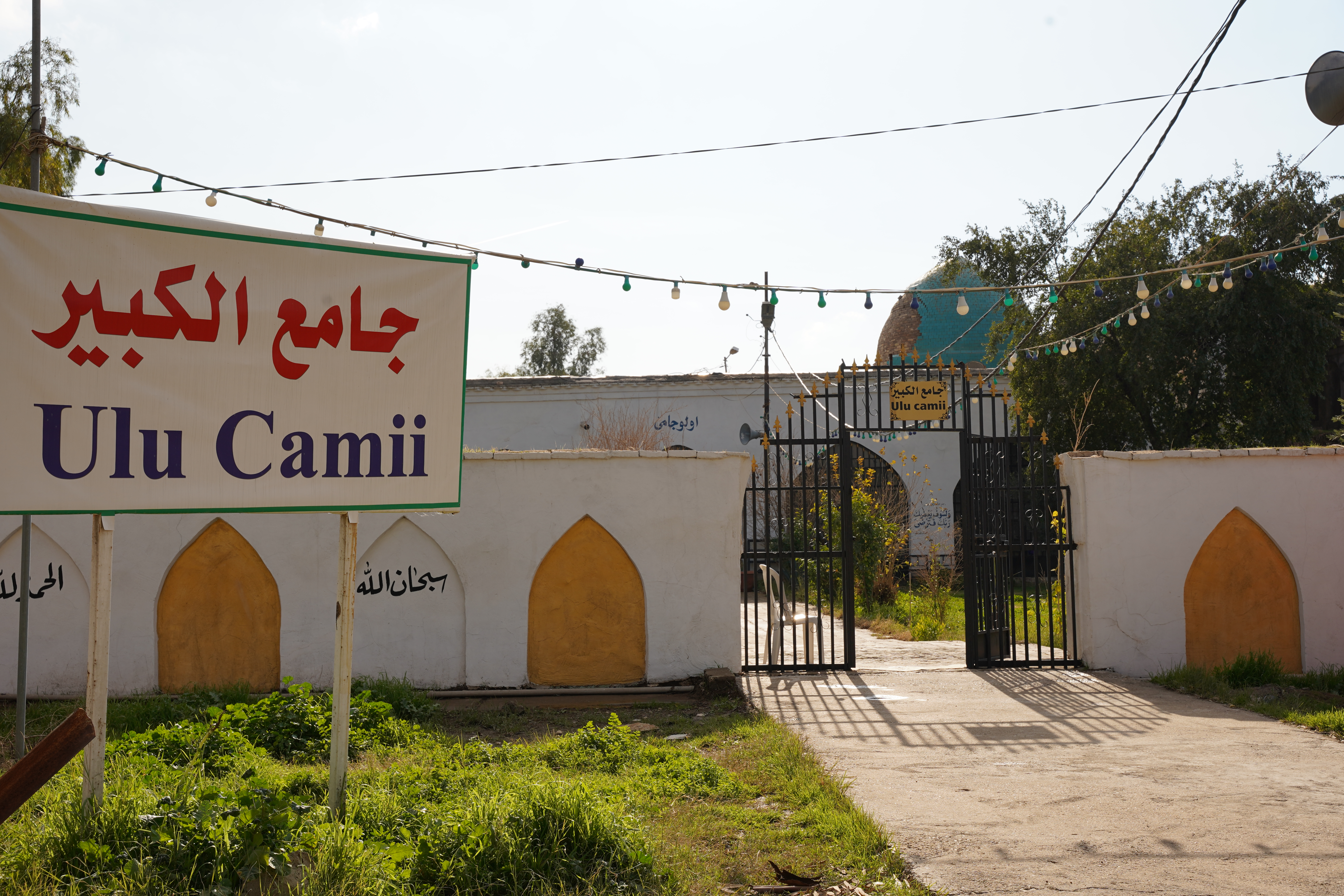
Main entrance to the mosque.

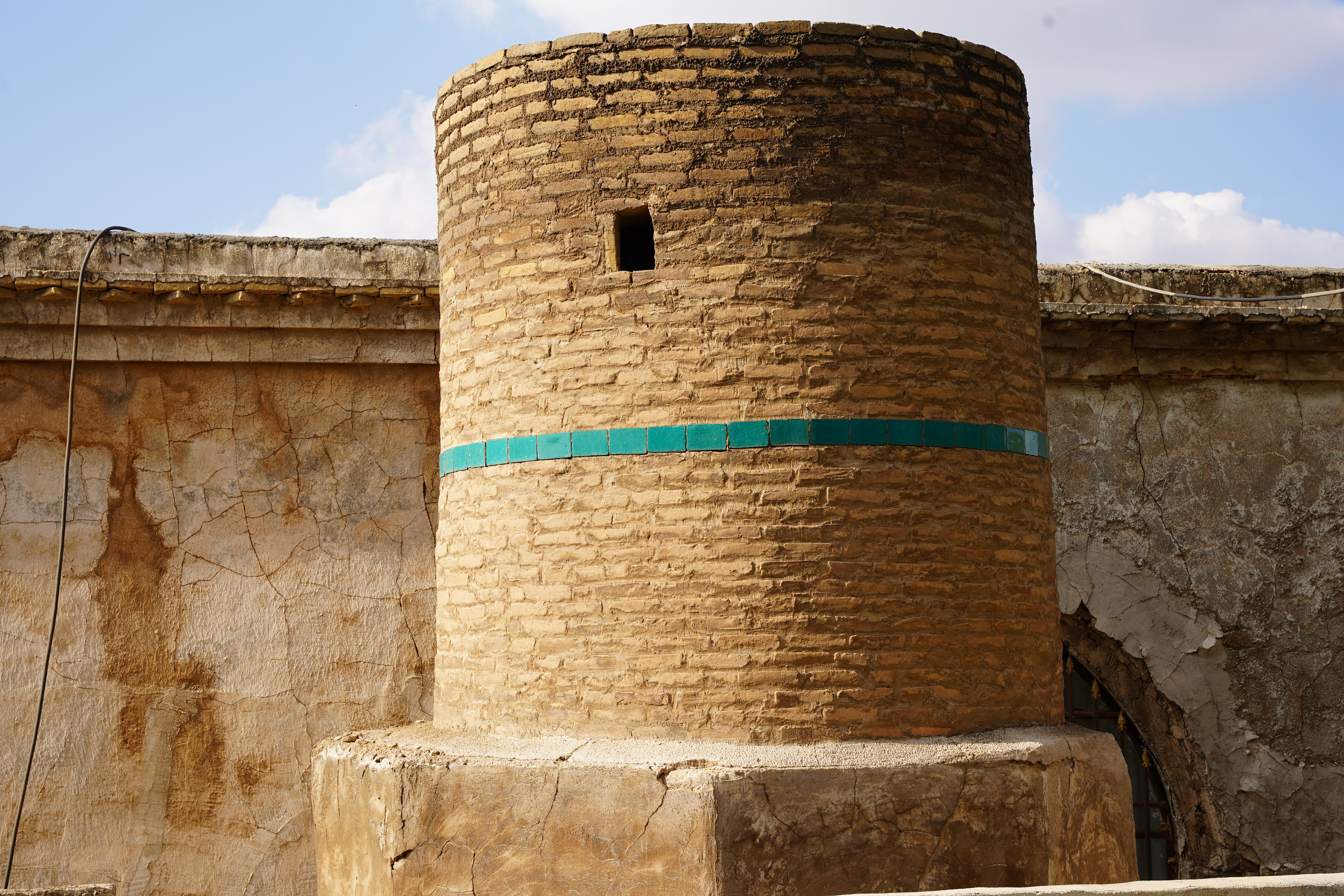
The ruined minaret of the mosque.

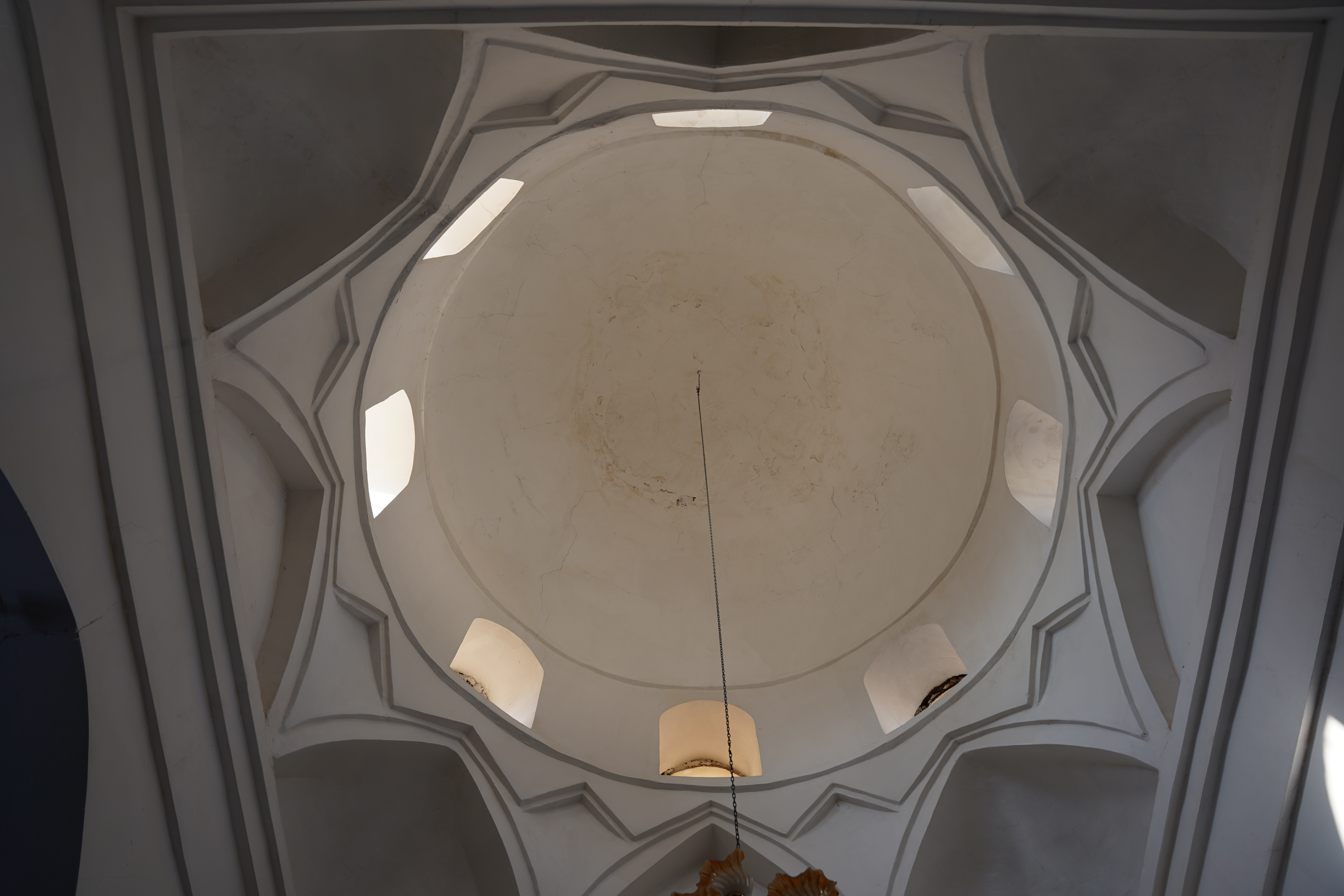
A view underneath the dome of the mosque.

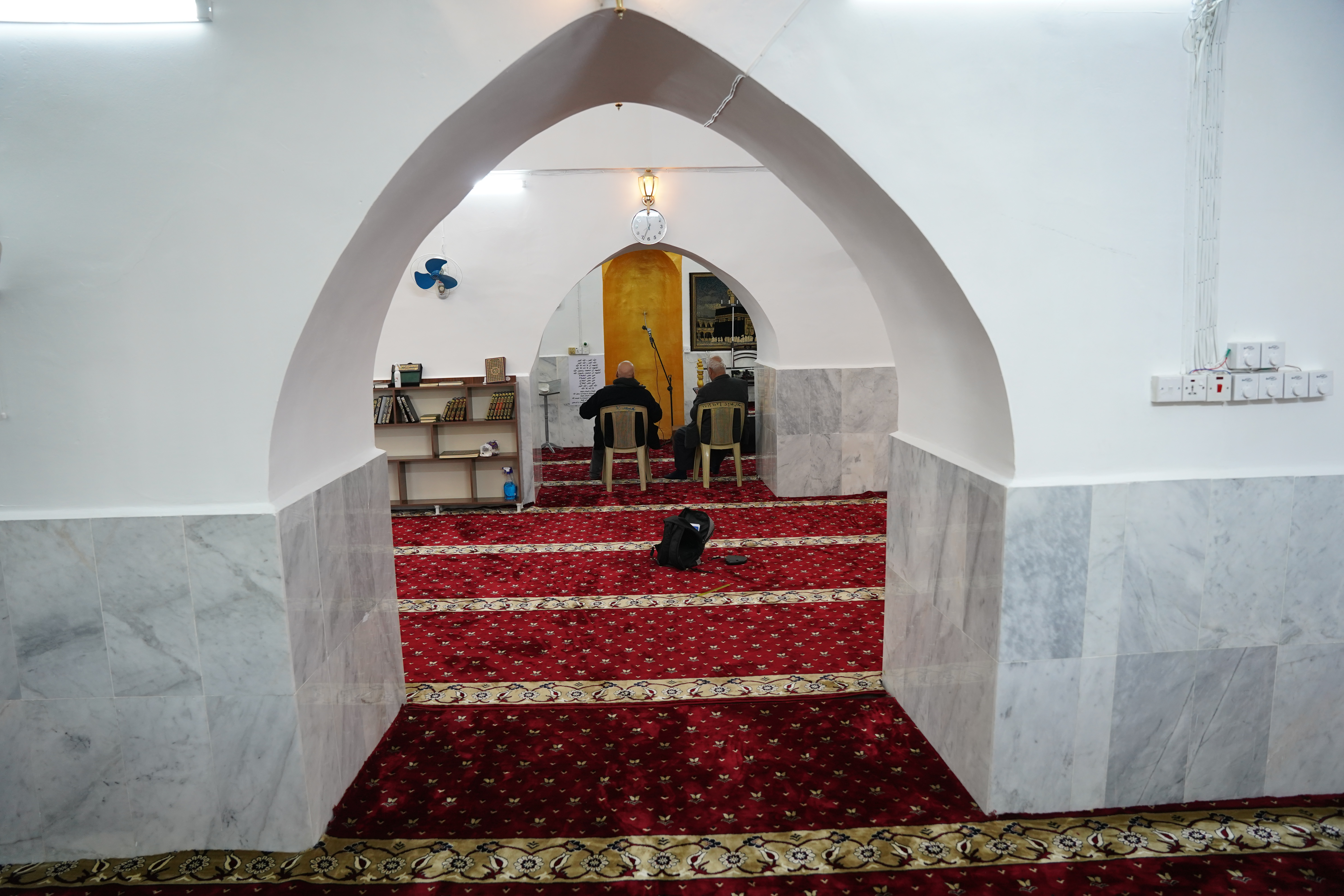
Inside the main prayer hall of the mosque.

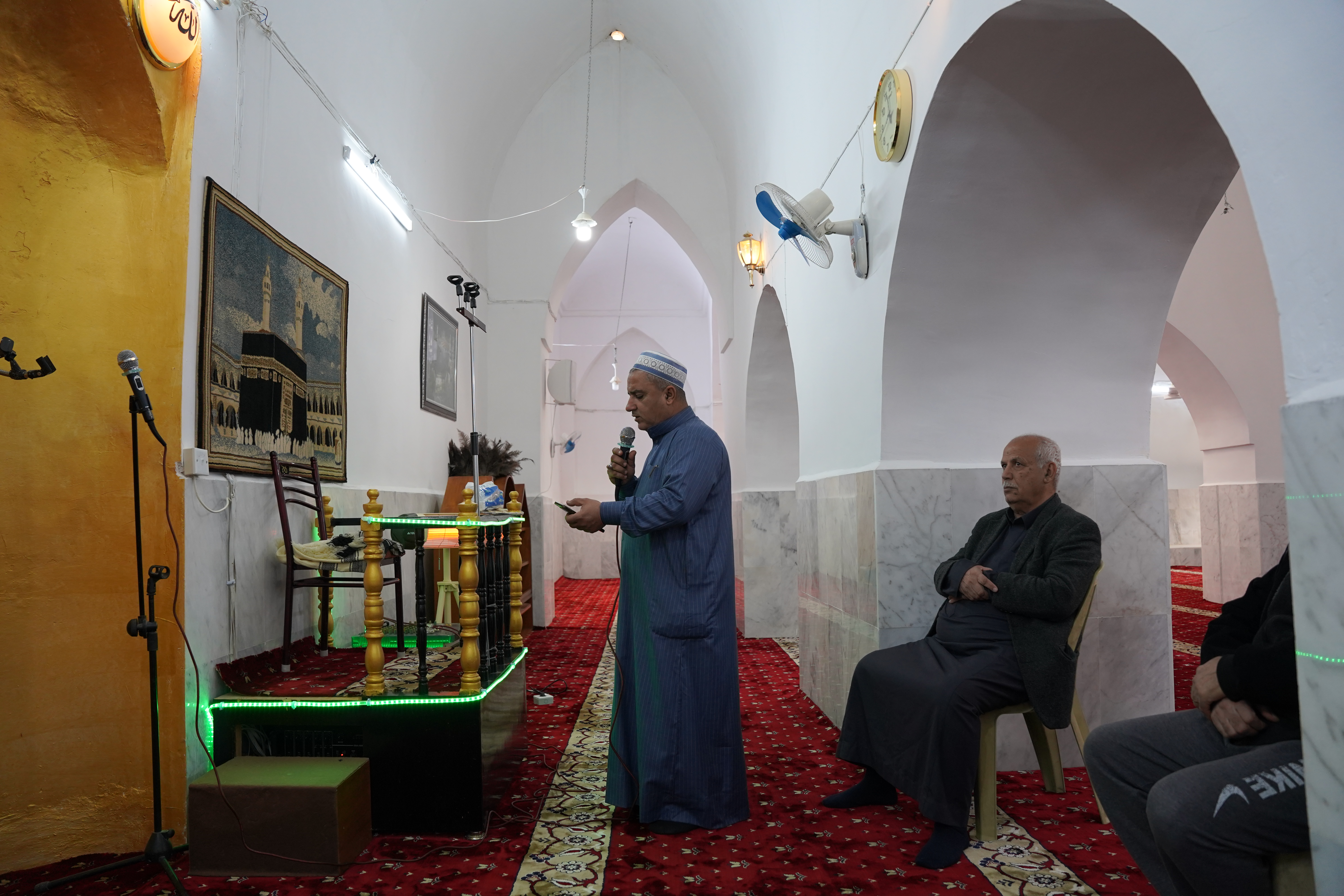
The muezzin reciting the iqamat for the Dhuhr prayer.

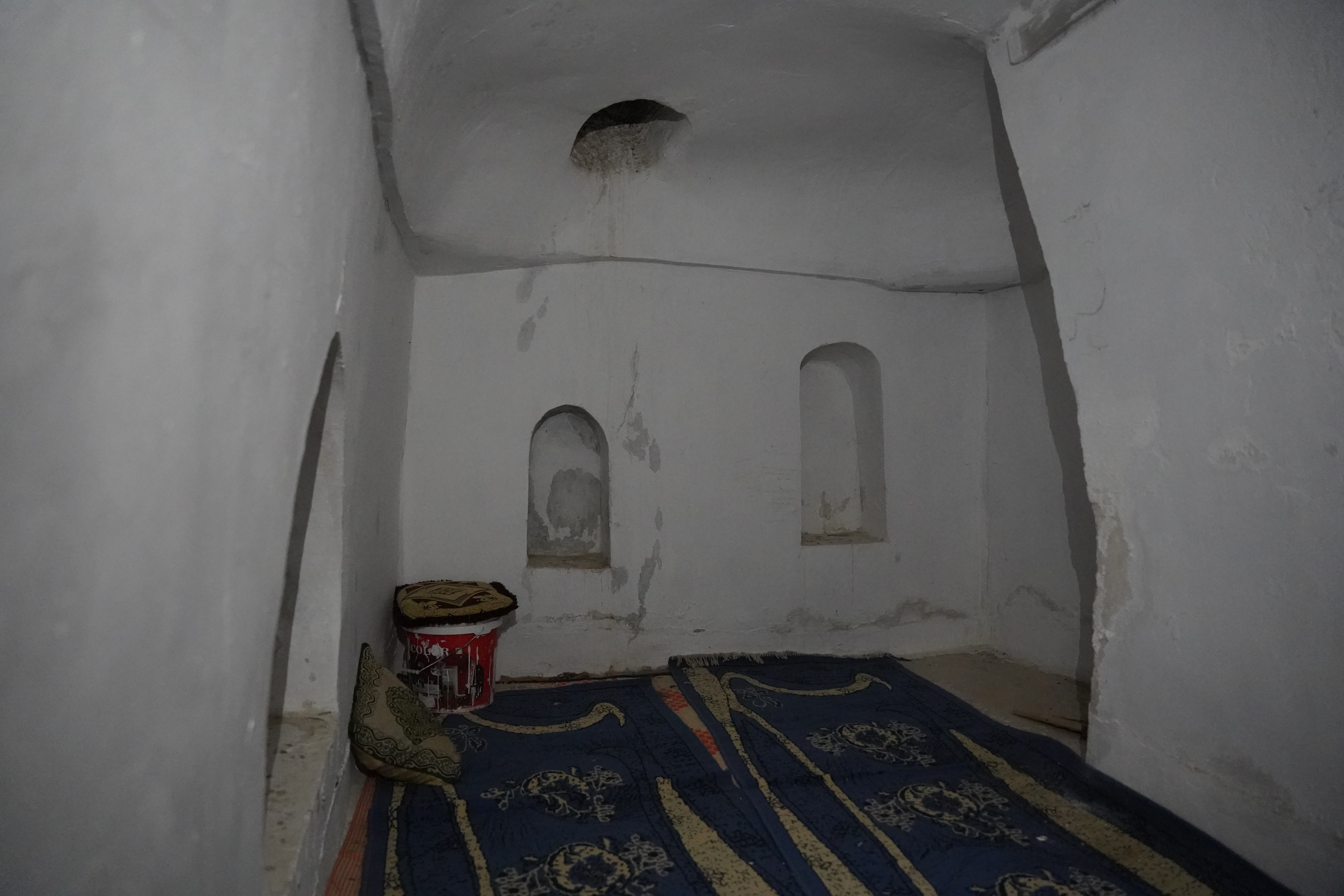
The musalla underneath the mosque.

== See also ==
- List of mosques in Iraq
