= Shadrach, Meshach, and Abednego =

Characters in the Book of Daniel

Saints Shadrach, Meshach, and Abednego Hananiah, Mishael, and Azariah
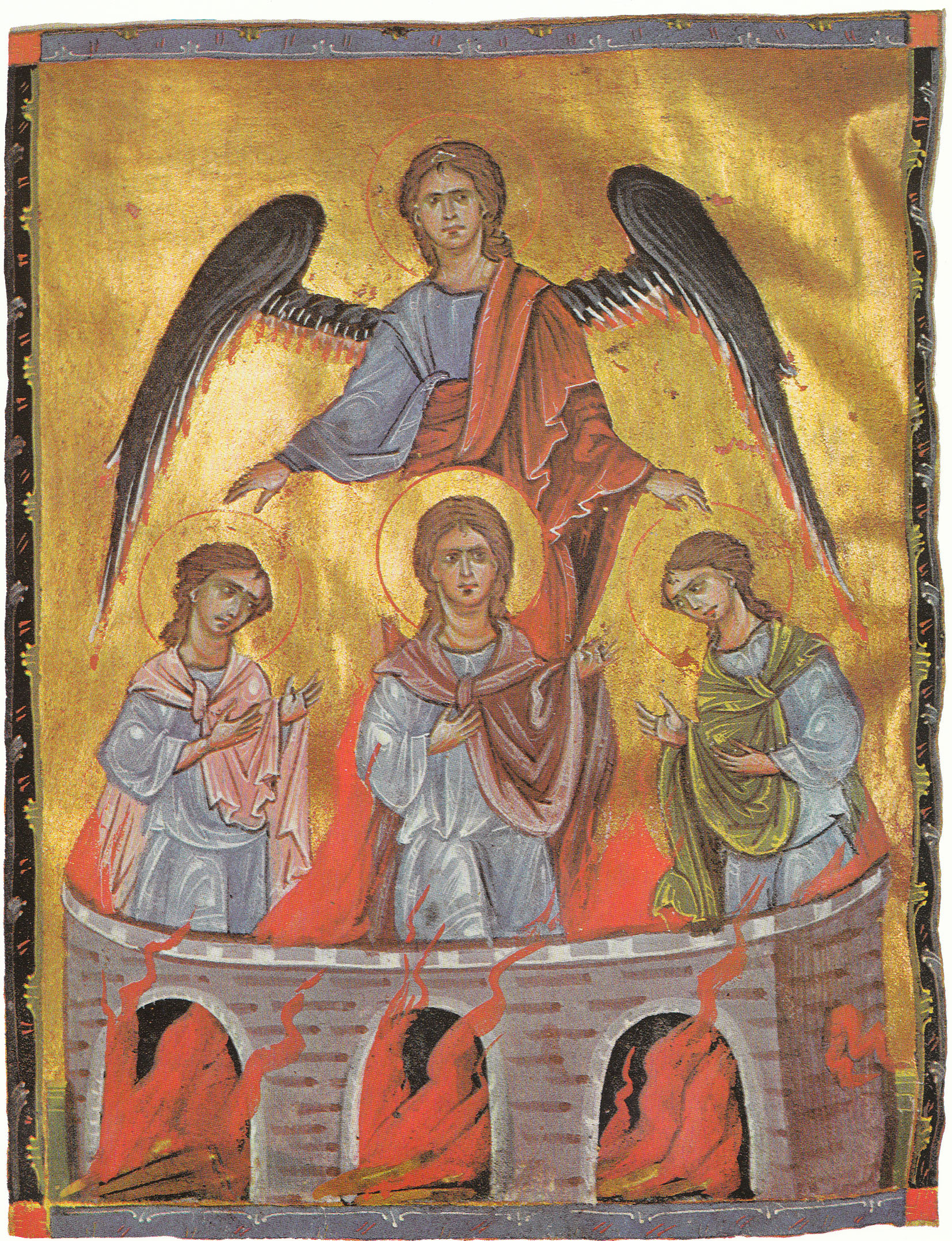
- Fiery furnace (1266) by Toros Roslin

Three Holy Children
- Venerated in: Judaism; Christianity; Islam
- Major shrine: Tomb of Daniel, Susa
- Feast: 16 December – Roman Rite; 17 December – Byzantine Rite; Tuesday after fourth Sunday of Pentecost – Armenian Rite; January 24 - Mozarabic Rite
- Attributes: Three men in the fiery furnace

Shadrach, Meshach, and Abednego (Hebrew names: Hananiah, Mishael, and Azariah) are figures from chapter 3 of the biblical Book of Daniel. In the narrative, the three Jewish men are thrown into a fiery furnace by Nebuchadnezzar II, King of Babylon for refusing to bow to the king's image. The three are preserved from harm, and the king sees four men walking in the flames, "the fourth ... like a son of God". They are first mentioned in Daniel 1, where alongside Daniel they are brought to Babylon to study Chaldean Aramaic language and literature with a view to serving at the King's court, and their Hebrew names are replaced with Babylonian names.

The first six chapters of Daniel are stories dating from the late Persian/early Hellenistic period, and Daniel's absence from the story of the Hebrew children in the fiery furnace suggests that it may originally have been independent. It forms a pair with the story of Daniel in the lions' den, both making the point that the god of the Jews will deliver those who are faithful to him.

== Summary ==
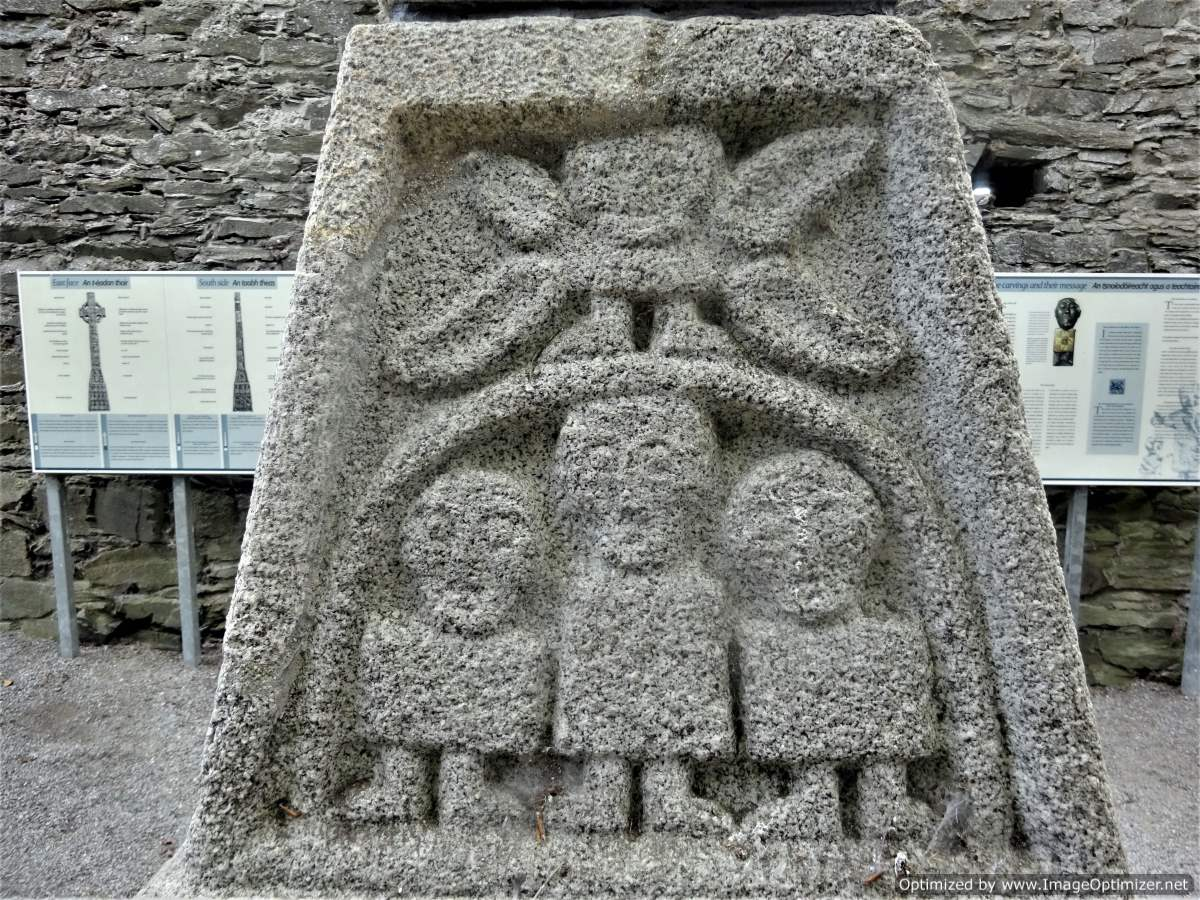
Depicted on Moone High Cross, Ireland, 10th century

King Nebuchadnezzar set up a golden image in the plain of Dura and commanded that all his officials bow before it. All who failed to do so would be thrown into a furnace. Certain officials informed the king that the three Jewish youths Hananiah, Mishael, and Azariah, who bore the Babylonian names Shadrach, Meshach, and Abednego, and whom the king had appointed to high office in Babylon, were refusing to worship the golden statue. The three were brought before Nebuchadnezzar, where they informed the king that God would be with them. Nebuchadnezzar commanded that they be thrown into the fiery furnace, heated seven times hotter than normal, but when the king looked, he saw four figures walking unharmed in the flames, the fourth "like a son of God." Seeing this, Nebuchadnezzar brought the youths out of the flames, and the fire had not had any effect on their bodies. The hair of their heads was not singed, their cloaks were not harmed, and no smell of fire was on them. The king then promoted them to high office, decreeing that anyone who spoke against God should be torn limb from limb.

== Composition and structure ==
=== Book of Daniel ===
It is generally accepted that the Book of Daniel originated as a collection of stories among the Jewish community in Babylon and Mesopotamia in the Persian and early Hellenistic periods (5th to 3rd centuries BCE), expanded by the visions of chapters 7–12 in the Maccabean era (mid-2nd century). Some researchers have concluded that Daniel is a legendary figure. It is possible that the name Daniel was chosen for the hero of the book because of his reputation as a wise seer in Hebrew tradition. The tales are in the voice of an anonymous narrator, except for chapter 4, which is in the form of a letter from king Nebuchadnezzar. Chapter 3 is unique in that Daniel does not appear in it.

=== Daniel 3 ===
Daniel 3 forms part of a chiasmus (a poetic structure in which the main point or message of a passage is placed in the centre and framed by further repetitions on either side) within Daniel 2–7, paired with Daniel 6, the story of Daniel in the lions' den:

- A. (2:4b-49) – A dream of four kingdoms replaced by a fifth
  - B. (3:1–30) – Daniel's three friends in the fiery furnace
    - C. (4:1–37) – Daniel interprets a dream for Nebuchadnezzar
    - C'. (5:1–31) – Daniel interprets the handwriting on the wall for Belshazzar
  - B'. (6:1–28) – Daniel in the lions' den
- A'. (7:1–28) – A vision of four world kingdoms replaced by a fifth

Chapters 3 and 6 contain significant differences. The story of the fiery furnace does not include Daniel, while the story of the lions' den does not include Daniel's friends; the first story takes place under Nebuchadnezzar and the second under Darius; and in the first story the disobedience to the earthly ruler takes place in public, while in the second Daniel petitions God in private. The stories thus supplement each other to make the point that the God of the Jews will deliver those who are faithful to him.

== Genre and themes ==
The legendary nature of the story is revealed by the liberal use of hyperbole – the size of the statue, the use of every kind of music, the destruction of the executioners, and the king's rage followed by his confession of the superiority of the god of Israel. The plot is a type known in folklore as "the disgrace and rehabilitation of a minister," the plot of which involves a man in a state of prosperity who is sentenced to death or prison by the plots of his enemies but vindicated and restored to honor.

When Nebuchadnezzar confronts the defiant Jewish youths who refuse to submit to his will he asks them what god will deliver them from his hands. Their reply is the theological high point of the story: without addressing the king by his title, they tell him that the question is not whether they are willing to bow before the king's image, but whether God is present and willing to save. When the three are thrown into the furnace the king sees four men walking in the flames, the fourth like "a son of gods," a divine being.

== Christian liturgy ==
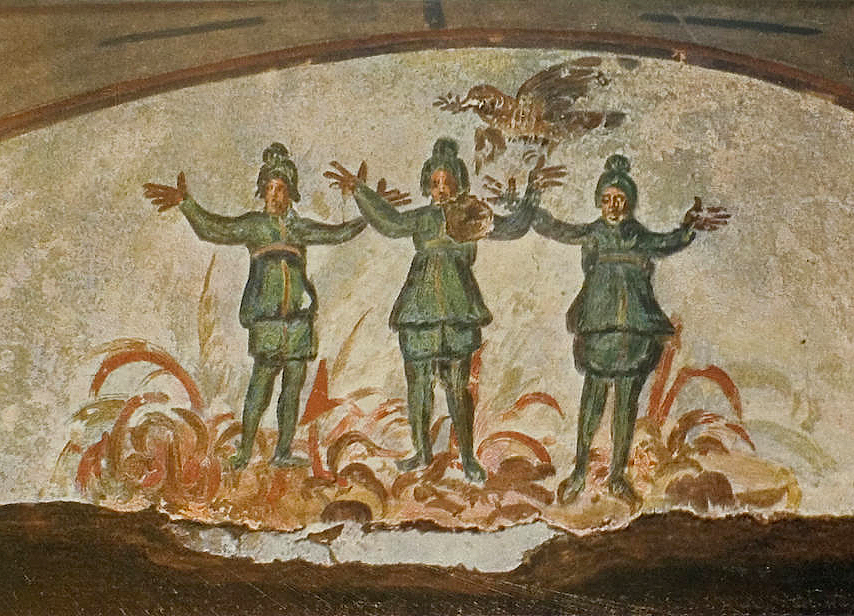
Catacomb of Priscilla, Rome, late 3rd century/early 4th century

The Greek Septuagint version of Daniel 3 includes the deuterocanonical Prayer of Azariah and Song of the Three Holy Children. The song is alluded to in odes seven and eight of the canon, a hymn sung in the matins service and on other occasions in the Eastern Orthodox Church and Byzantine Catholic Church. The reading of the story of the fiery furnace, including the song, is prescribed for the vesperal Divine Liturgy celebrated by the Orthodox and Byzantine Catholics on Holy Saturday. The Latin canticle Benedicite, opera omnia Domini is based on the "song of the three youths". In the Roman Catholic Church, it is used at Lauds for Sundays and feast days. In the Anglican Book of Common Prayer, it is an alternative to the Te Deum at Morning Prayer, and is often used during Lent and Advent.

In the Byzantine Rite Churches, both Orthodox and Catholic, the feast day of the three youths, along with Daniel, is 17 December. The Orthodox and Byzantine Catholics also commemorate them on the two Sundays before the Nativity of Christ.

In the Armenian Apostolic Church, one of the Oriental Orthodox or ancient non-Chalcedonian churches, the feast day of the three youths, along with Daniel, is commemorated on the Tuesday after the fourth Sunday of Pentecost.

The Lutheran Church–Missouri Synod also includes Daniel and the three youths in the Calendar of Saints on 17 December.

== Interpretations ==
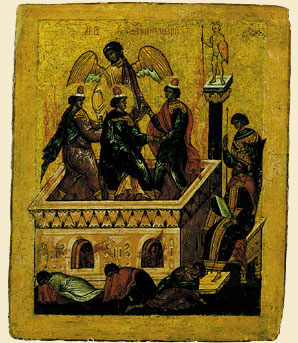
The Three Young Men in the Fiery Furnace (15th-century icon of the Novgorod school)

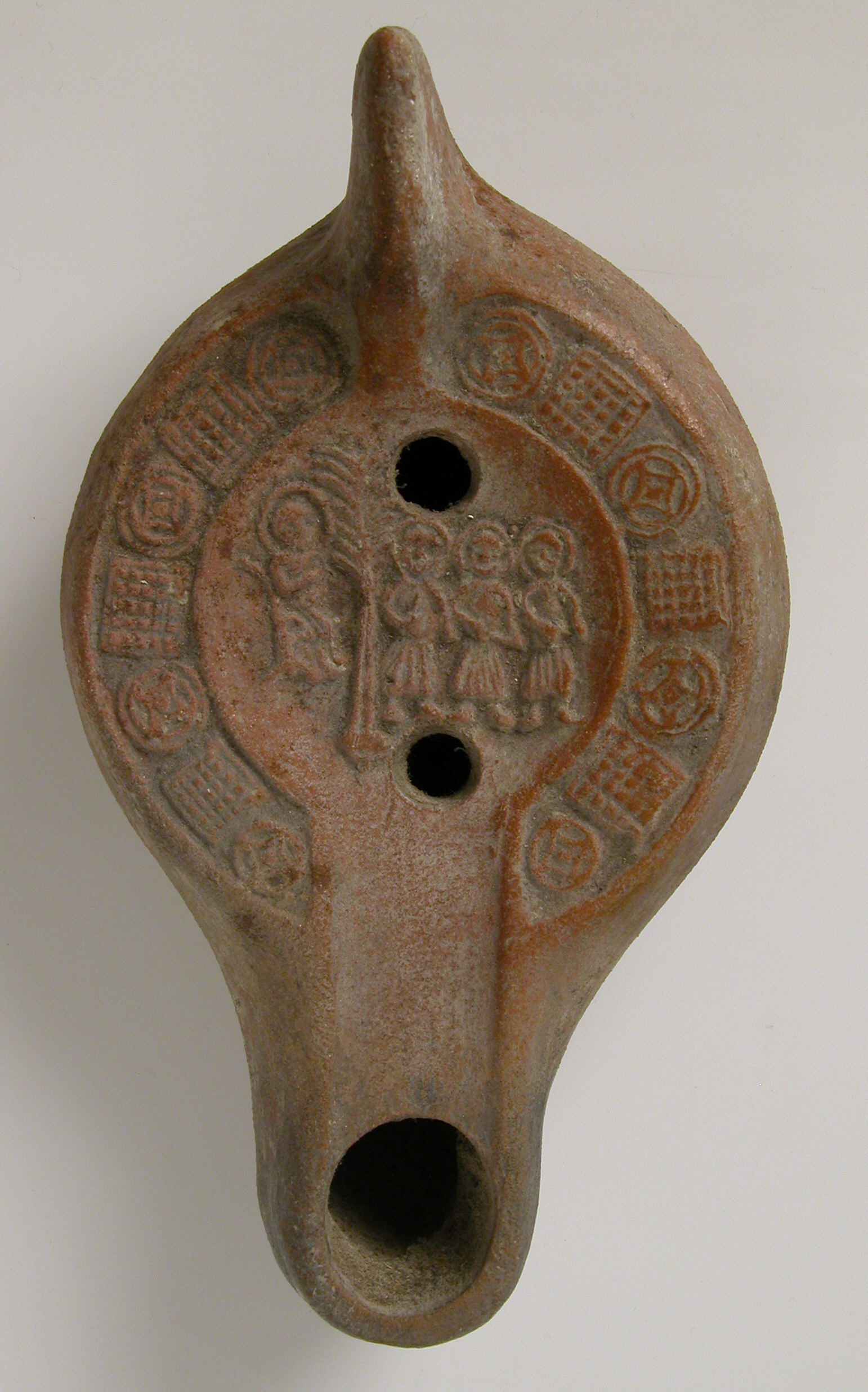
Depicted on an oil lamp, Tunisia, 5th–6th century CE

Daniel's absence from the tale of Shadrach, Meshach and Abednego suggests that it may originally have been an independent story. According to the Talmud (Sanhedrin 93a), Daniel was out of the country at the time of the incident.

The Hebrew names of the three youths were Hananiah (חֲנַנְיָה Ḥănanyā), "Yah is gracious", Mishael (מִישָׁאֵל Mīšā’ēl), "Who is what El is?" and Azariah (עֲזַרְיָה Ǎzaryā), "Yah has helped", but by the king's decree they were assigned Chaldean names, so that Hananiah became Shadrach (שַׁדְרַך Šaḏraḵ), Mishael became Meshach (מֵישַׁךְ Mēšaḵ) and Azariah became Abednego (עֲבֵד נְגוֹ ‘Ǎḇēḏ-Nəgō).

The Chaldean names are related to the Hebrew ones, with the names El and Yah replaced by Babylonian theonyms: Šaḏraḵ may reflect Šudur Aku "Command of Aku (the moon god)", Mêšaḵ is probably a variation of Mi-ša-aku, meaning "Who is as Aku is?", and Abednego is either "Slave of the god Nebo/Nabu" or a variation of Abednergal, "Slave of the god Nergal."

The word "Dura" (where the statue is erected) means simply "plain" or "fortress" and is not any specific place; the Greek historian Herodotus mentions a golden image of the god Bel in Babylon, but the gigantic size of this statue might suggest that its origins lie in folklore. The statue's dimensions (6×60 cubits) are linked intertextually with those of Ezra–Nehemiah's Second Temple (60×60 cubits), suggesting that the king's image is contrasted with the post-exilic place of worship for faithful Jews like Daniel.

=== Proposed historicity ===
Although the story includes legendary elements, it may have been based on a real event. The Neo-Babylonian Unger prism contains writings about Nebuchadnezzar's relationship with the Babylonian gods and a list of over 50 officials who served under his rule. The list is unique as it's the most comprehensive ancient Mesopotamian list of official servants. The list is divided into five sections; notably, it also includes unnamed Babylonian vassal kings in Syro-Palestine. Scholar William H. Shea in 1982 suggested that the list, and the prism's content, may indicate that it recorded a loyalty oath taken by all the civil servants and vassal kings after a rebellion. It can also explain king Zedekiah's trip to Babylon that was mentioned in Jeremiah 51:59. Several Neo-Babylonian records, such as the Nebuchadnezzar Chronicle, hint at serious military revolts happening across Akkad and Babylon. The list was recorded a year after the revolts happened. Due to this, it's proposed that the military revolts led to the loyalty oath, which would've been taken in front of the statue of Marduk instead of an image of Nebuchadnezzar by the kings and officials.

Furthermore, the Unger prism's list of top civil servants mentions three figures that William H. Shea identifies with Shadrach, Meshach, and Abednego. Their names go as follows:

- Ḫananu, chief of the royal merchants: Assyriologist Adolf Leo Oppenheim noted that the name Ḫananu is of Phoenician origin and a name built off the Semitic root Ḥ-N-N. William H. Shea claimed that Babylonian scribes likely erased the Yahwistic reference in his original name "Hananiah." Despite the record, it's unknown why, if the identification is correct, Hananiah wasn't recorded by his Biblical Babylonian name instead.
- Ardi-Nabu, secretary of the crown prince (likely Amel-Marduk): According to Shea, the name "Abednego" is likely a corruption of the Akkadian name Abd-Nabu. The Semitic word Abd means "servant" in both Hebrew and Aramaic. He argued that Babylonians would have more naturally used Akkadian and East Semitic words for a servant of a god, in this case Nabu. "Ardi-Nabu" would've been the West Semitic variant of the Akkadian name. The proposed identification with Abednego also raises an interesting point about 2 Kings 25. It mentions that Jeconiah was freed by the next Neo-Babylonian king, Amel-Marduk, as an act of kindness towards the exiled Judahites.
- Mušallim-Marduk, an overseer of the slave girls: Shea states, as with the previous two, the divine elements of Mishael's name were erased and replaced. Using that method, Marduk likely replaced El in Mishael's name. Although Mušallim seems to be a Babylonian vocalization of the whole Hebrew name instead.

The events of the revolts and loyalty oath to the statue are dated to around 594/593 BCE. John J. Collins considered the "loyalty-oath" hypothesis in relation to Daniel 3, with Jewish exiles already ranking in these early periods amongst Babylonian officials to be doubtful, and if any historical revolt occurred it "cannot be taken as evidence for the historicity of the story in its present form." According to Patrick Mazani, "the association of Ardi-Nabu, Amel-Marduk's official, with the biblical Abednego remains fictitious."

== Tombs ==
In the Kirkuk Citadel in Northern Iraq, two tombs are claimed to house the remains of Hananiah and Azariah (Arabized as Hunayn and 'Uzayr) inside the Mosque of the Prophet Daniel. However, the third tomb is claimed to be not that of Mishael, but rather Daniel. The site used to be a synagogue but was then turned into a church and finally into a mosque.

== In modern Western culture ==
=== Literature ===
- 1762: Tristram Shandy by Laurence Sterne contains a fanciful anecdote (Vol 4. Chapter XXI) about Francis I of France deciding to grant a favour to Switzerland by allowing the "republick" to stand as godparent to his next child: the names proposed by the Swiss for the child are "Shadrach, Mesech, and Abed-nego". Judith Hawley's note in the Norton Critical Edition suggests that this is because the three defied the power of a king.
- 1865: In Anthony Trollope's novel Miss Mackenzie, the protagonist John Ball is a director of two ironically named insurance companies, the Shadrach Fire Assurance Office and the Abednego Life Office. Literary scholar A. O. J. Cockshut called this "Another example of Trollope's fondness for jokes about names." The Spectator in its original unsigned review of the novel in 1865 noted "how happy is Mr. Trollope's humor in inventing names!"
- 1954: Flannery O’Connor’s short story “A Circle in the Fire” closes with an allusion that explains the story’s title: “…a few wild high shrieks of joy as if the prophets were dancing in the fiery furnace, in the circle the angel had cleared for them.”
- 1963: Martin Luther King Jr. references them in his "Letter from Birmingham Jail".
- 1915–1974: Bertie Wooster, a central character in many novels and short stories by British comic author P. G. Wodehouse, makes occasional reference to the three figures, having learned about them in school in the course of winning a prize for scripture knowledge.
- 1961: R. F. Delderfield wrote a novel called Stop at a Winner about Abednego Pascoe who survives the furnace of World War II; his two older brothers were named Shadrach and Meshach.
- 1976: Robert Silverberg wrote a novel based on this story, called Shadrach in the Furnace.
- 1989: "Scintillant Orange", a story in William Vollmann's collection The Rainbow Stories, is an elaboration of the S, M, & A tale.

=== Music ===
- 1734, revised 1774: Il Cantico de' tre fanciulli, cantata by Johann Adolph Hasse (1699–1783)
- 1885: The Three Holy Children, oratorio by Charles Villiers Stanford
- 1930s: "Shadrack", popular song by Robert MacGimsey, performed by several singers including Louis Armstrong
- 1955–1956: Gesang der Jünglinge, electronic music by Karlheinz Stockhausen
- 1966: The Burning Fiery Furnace, a music drama by Benjamin Britten
- 1968: A song, "The Fourth Man in the Fire", by Arthur "Guitar Boogie" Smith, recorded by The Statler Brothers and by Johnny Cash (1969)
- 1972: It's Cool in the Furnace, an album of songs written by Buryl Red and Grace Hawthorne followed by a 1973 musical still performed by churches and religious schools
- 1974: "Loose Booty", recorded by Sly and the Family Stone
- 1976: "Abendigo", recorded by The Abyssinians
- 1979: "Survival", recorded by Bob Marley and the Wailers, "...like Shadrach, Mishrach and Abednego, thrown in the fire but they never get burn..."
- 1980: "Never Get Burn", recorded by The Twinkle Brothers
- 1989: "Shadrach" by Beastie Boys
- 1991: “Infamous Date Rape”, recorded by A Tribe Called Quest, “… she’s hotter than Meshach, Shadrach and Abednego…”
- 1999: "Never Bow Down", recorded by Third Day
- 2005: "Abendigo", cover by Sinéad O'Connor of original by The Abyssinians
- 2007: "Burn Us Up", recorded by Shane and Shane
- 2010: "A Good Name" by Shad
- 2010: "Onward" by Greydon Square
- 2011: Meshach Dreams Back by Jane Siberry
- 2012: "Into the Fire" by Foy Vance
- 2019: "Another in the Fire", recorded by Hillsong United
- 2021: "Fye Fye", recorded by Tobe Nwigwe
- 2023: "Khalas", recorded by Swizz Beats feat. Jay Electronica
- 2024: "That's Who I Praise" by Brandon Lake

=== Film and television ===
- 1995: "Rack, Shack & Benny", an animated video in the VeggieTales franchise. In this version, to keep it child friendly and simplify the story, the title characters – whose names are shortened versions of Shadrach, Meshach, and Abednego, respectively – work in a chocolate factory, and they refuse to worship a giant chocolate bunny or sing "The Bunny Song", which declares that the chocolate bunny is more important than anything else. They are thrown into the factory's furnace but survive, similarly to how the biblical story tells the tale. This video also marks the first appearance of one of series’ main cast, Mr. Nezzer, who appears in the video as the main antagonist. His full name, “Nebby K. Nezzer”, is a pun on the name of Nebuchadnezzar II, and it has remained as his official name.
- 1945: Ivan the Terrible, a Soviet film by the director Sergei Eisenstein. The boyars and clergy who oppose Tsar Ivan IV stage a theatrical performance of this biblical story inside a cathedral, in order to spite him by implying that he has become a tyrant, just like the biblical king Nebuchadnezzar.

== See also ==
- Prayer of Azariah and Song of the Three Holy Children
