= Mosque of the Prophet Daniel, Kirkuk =

Mosque inside the Kirkuk Citadel

Mosque of the Prophet Daniel
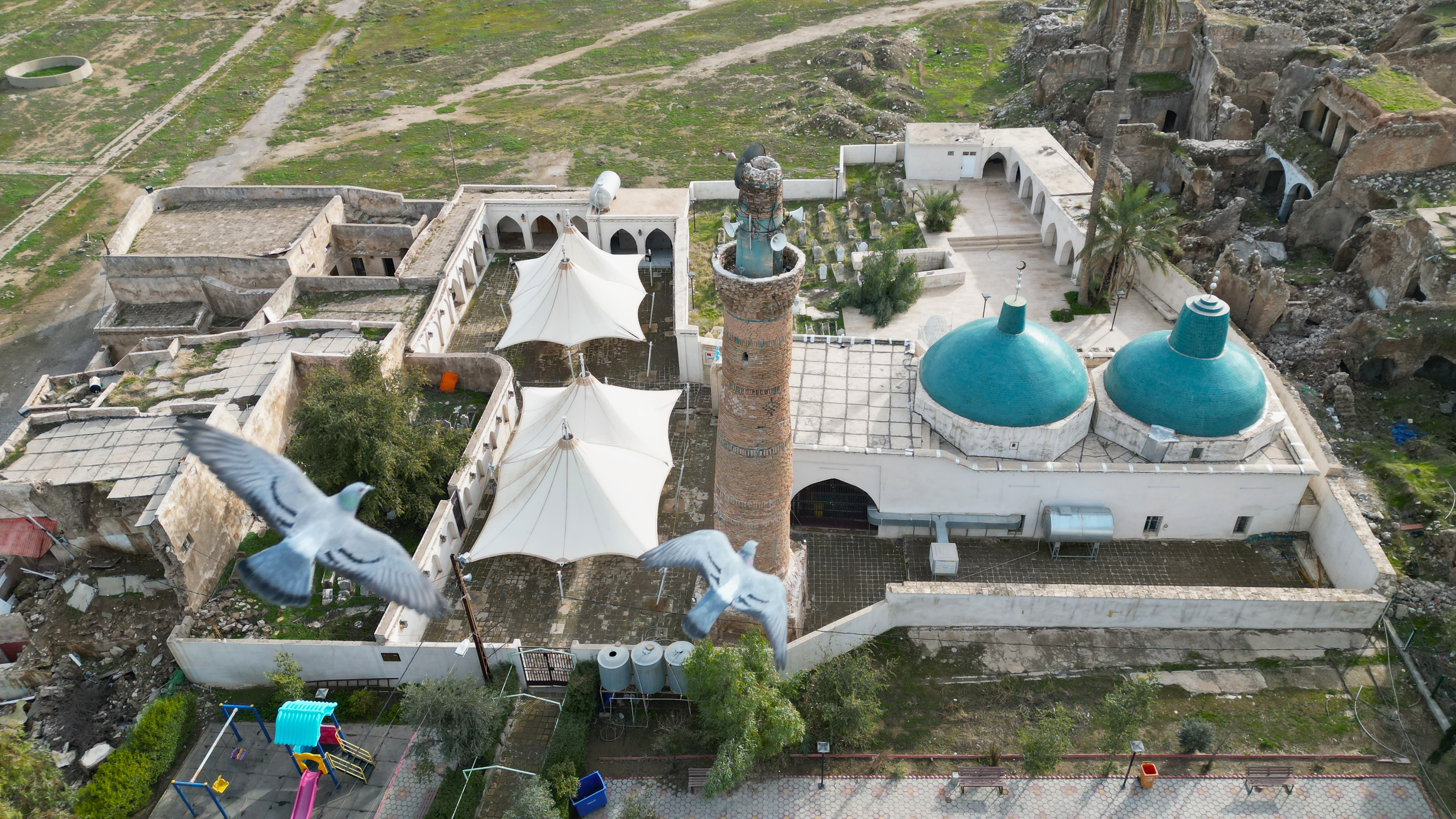
- Aerial view of the Mosque of the Prophet Daniel in 2026

- Location in Iraq

Religion
- Affiliation: Sunni Islam

Location
- Location: Peygamber Daniel Camii, Kirkuk, Kirkuk Governorate, 36001, Iraq
- Country: Iraq
- Interactive map of Mosque of the Prophet Daniel
- Coordinates: 35°28′08″N 44°23′44″E

Architecture
- Type: Mosque
- Style: Persian, Jalayirid
- Completed: c. 8th century (original structure) c. 14th century (current structure)

Specifications
- Dome: 2
- Minaret: 1

The Mosque of the Prophet Daniel (Arabic: جامع النبي دانيال, romanized: Jami' al-Nabī Dānyāl) is a mosque located in the Kirkuk Citadel of Kirkuk, Iraq. It is named after the biblical Daniel, whom locals believe is buried in the mosque along with Shadrach, Meshach, and Abednego. Much like the Great Mosque in the same place, this mosque is a heritage site of the Kirkuk Governorate due to being located within the central citadel of the city.

== History ==
Folklore has it that Umar ibn al-Khattab, the second Rashidun caliph, ordered that thirteen graves be dug to hide the body of Daniel to prevent idolatry, with later narrators adding that one of the purported locations was Susa, Tarsus, and now Kirkuk. An alternative tradition, however, states that the entombed is actually a Muslim scholar named Nabit Daniyal, whose name was later conflated with the biblical prophet Daniel, due to his first name Nabit having similarities with the Arabic word "Nabi" which means Prophet. Regardless of the conflict in the narratives, the Jews and Christians in the area of Kirkuk believed the present mosque to be the burial place of Daniel as well as that of Shadrach, Meshach, and Abednego, even before the advent of Islam.

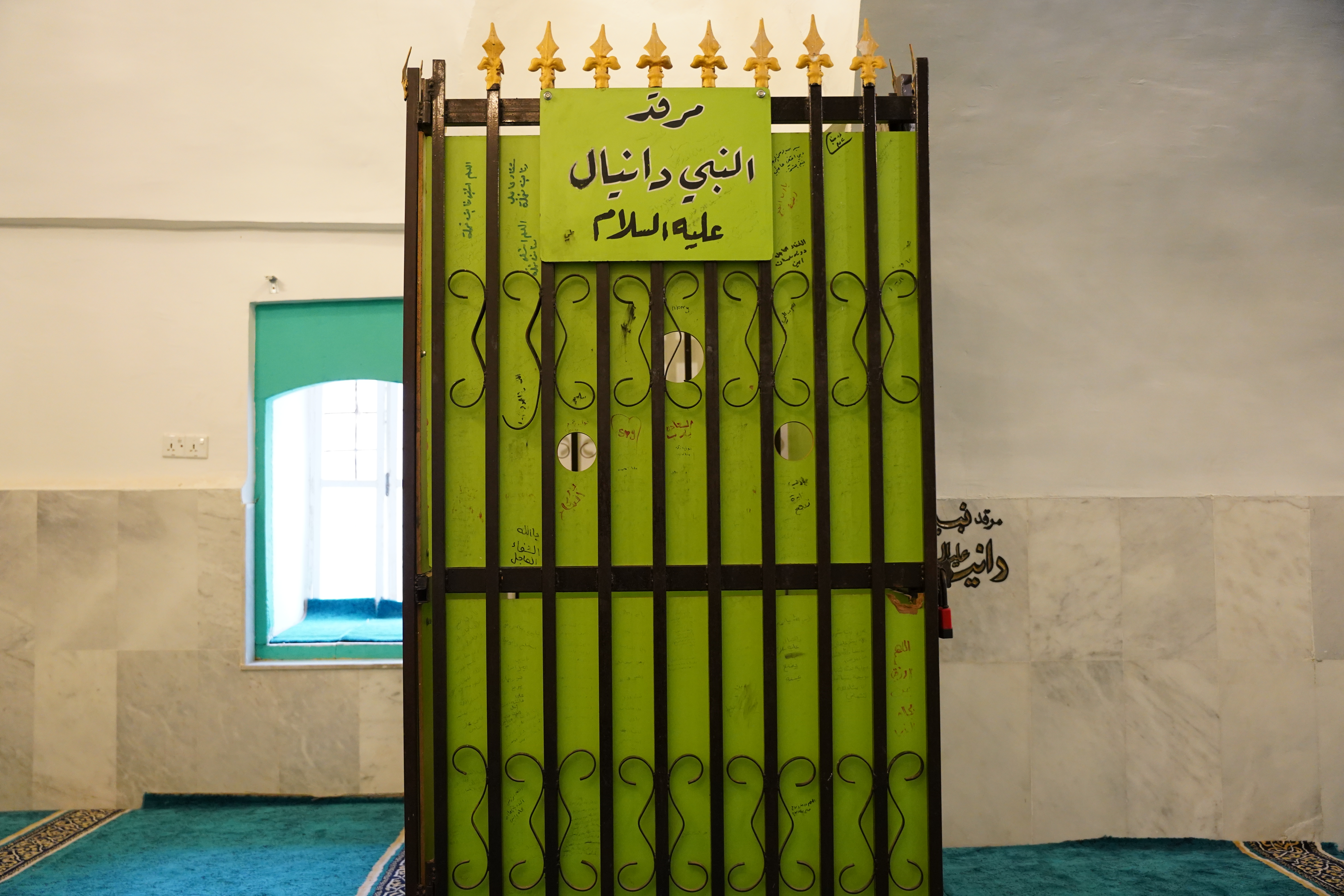
The tomb of Daniel inside the main prayer hall of the mosque.

The original structure was a synagogue that was later converted into a church by the Christianized inhabitants of Kirkuk during the pre-Islamic time period. During the rule of Umayyad caliph Umar ibn Abd al-Aziz (r. 717–720) the church was converted into a mosque. In the 14th century, the Jalayirids completely reconstructed the mosque, adding a brick minaret to the mosque building. The present enshrined graves, however, were only moved into main prayer hall of the building in 1700 during Ottoman rule over Kirkuk, which was not an unexpected move as the Ottomans were fond of building shrines over the tombs of respected prophets. The first cemetery in Kirkuk was also established behind the mosque, as locals wanted to bury their dead close to the revered prophet. After World War I, this cemetery became famous as a cemetery for Ottoman soldiers who had died in the war.

During the Ba'athist period, the mosque was abandoned and left in a dilapidated state, which prompted a series of botched restorations between 1998 and 2003. In 2021, the mosque was officially declared a heritage site of Kirkuk due to being a part of the historic Kirkuk Citadel complex. The mosque is also frequently visited by the local Jews and Christians who pay their respects to the three shrines.

== Architecture ==
The present day mosque dates back to the 14th century and is built in a style that is typical of Persian architecture. The main prayer hall is topped by a pair of identical blue-tiled domes, while the three enshrined graves dedicated to the biblical Daniel and two other saints, Hananiah and Azariah (revered figures from the Book of Daniel) stand side by side in the main prayer hall. The location of the graves is interesting as it defies the orthodox Sunni Islamic view where graves are not allowed to be inside the main prayer hall of a mosque, although as these are only purported graves that may not contain any remains, this may be an exception. A fourth grave belonging to the saint Mishael, or Meschach, has since disappeared from the mosque in the early 21st century while the grave of Azariah, or Abednego, has been replaced with a grave erroneously attributed to the biblical Ezra, who is a separate figure revered by Jews and Sunni Muslims.

The minaret of the mosque is cylindrical in shape and made of brick, adorned with tiles. Much like the rest of the mosque, it dates back to Jalayirid rule and is an example of Jalayirid architecture in the Islamic-ruled periods of the Kirkuk Governorate.

== Other tombs dedicated to Daniel in Iraq ==
In the city of Mosul, there is another mosque containing a tomb dedicated to Daniel. The mosque was blown up in 2014 by rebel factions in Mosul, who viewed it as a place of idolatry. After the rebels had been driven out of Mosul, the mosque was rebuilt in 2020 and reopened its doors in 2023.

A small domed shrine to Daniel was present in a forested area of Diyala, but was destroyed with rocket launchers by rebel militias camping in the area.

== Gallery ==
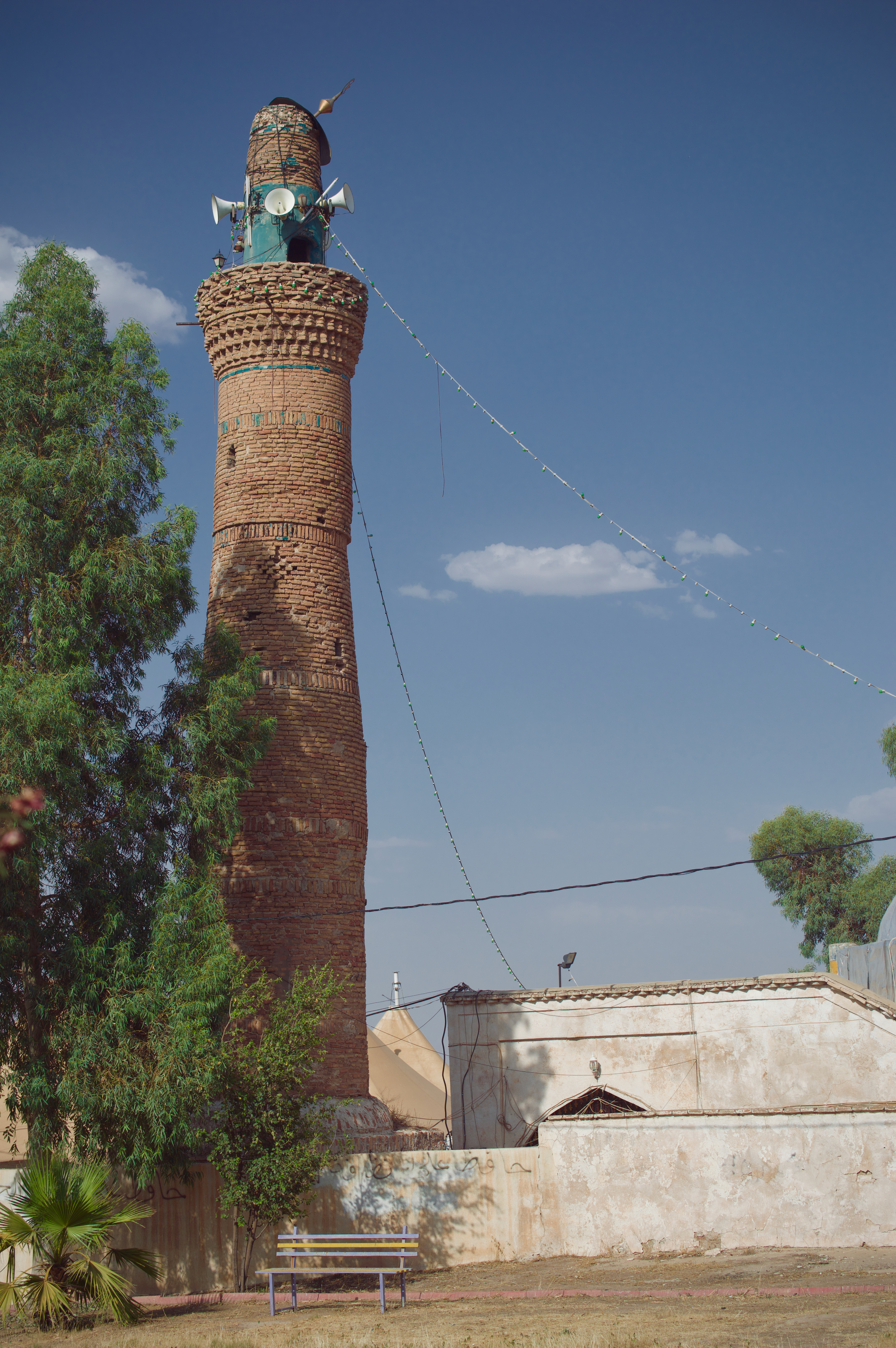
The minaret of the mosque.

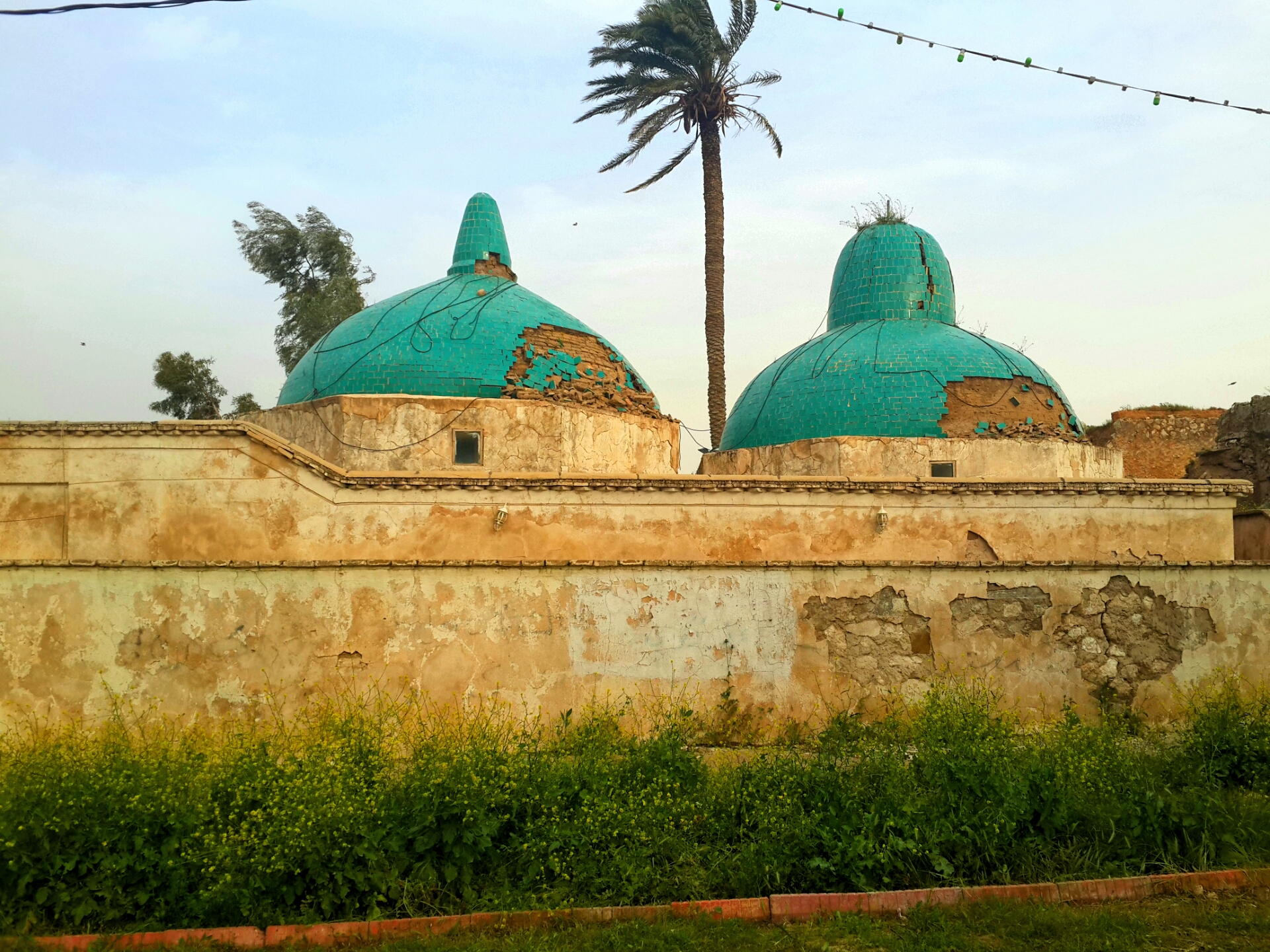
The domes of the mosque.

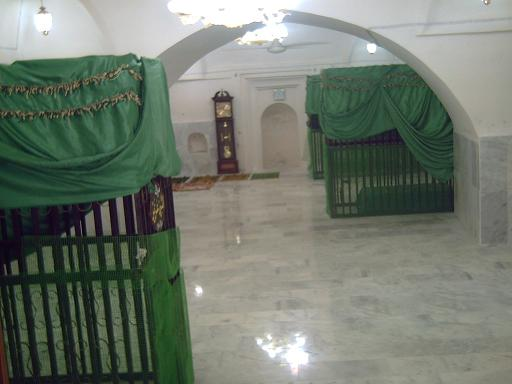
The main prayer hall of the mosque, with three cages around the graves of Daniel, Hananiah, and Azariah.

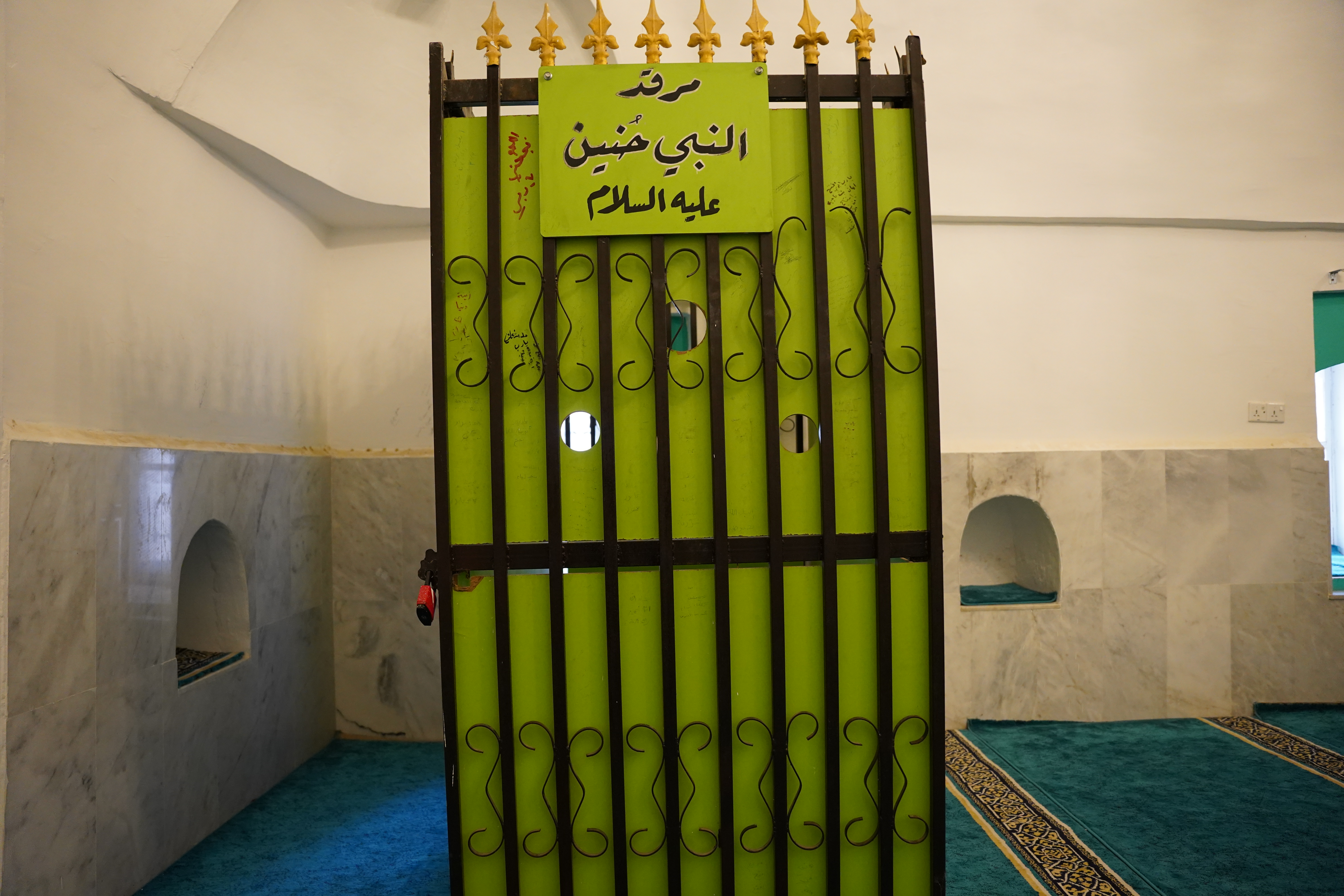
The tomb of Hananiah, also known as Shadrach.

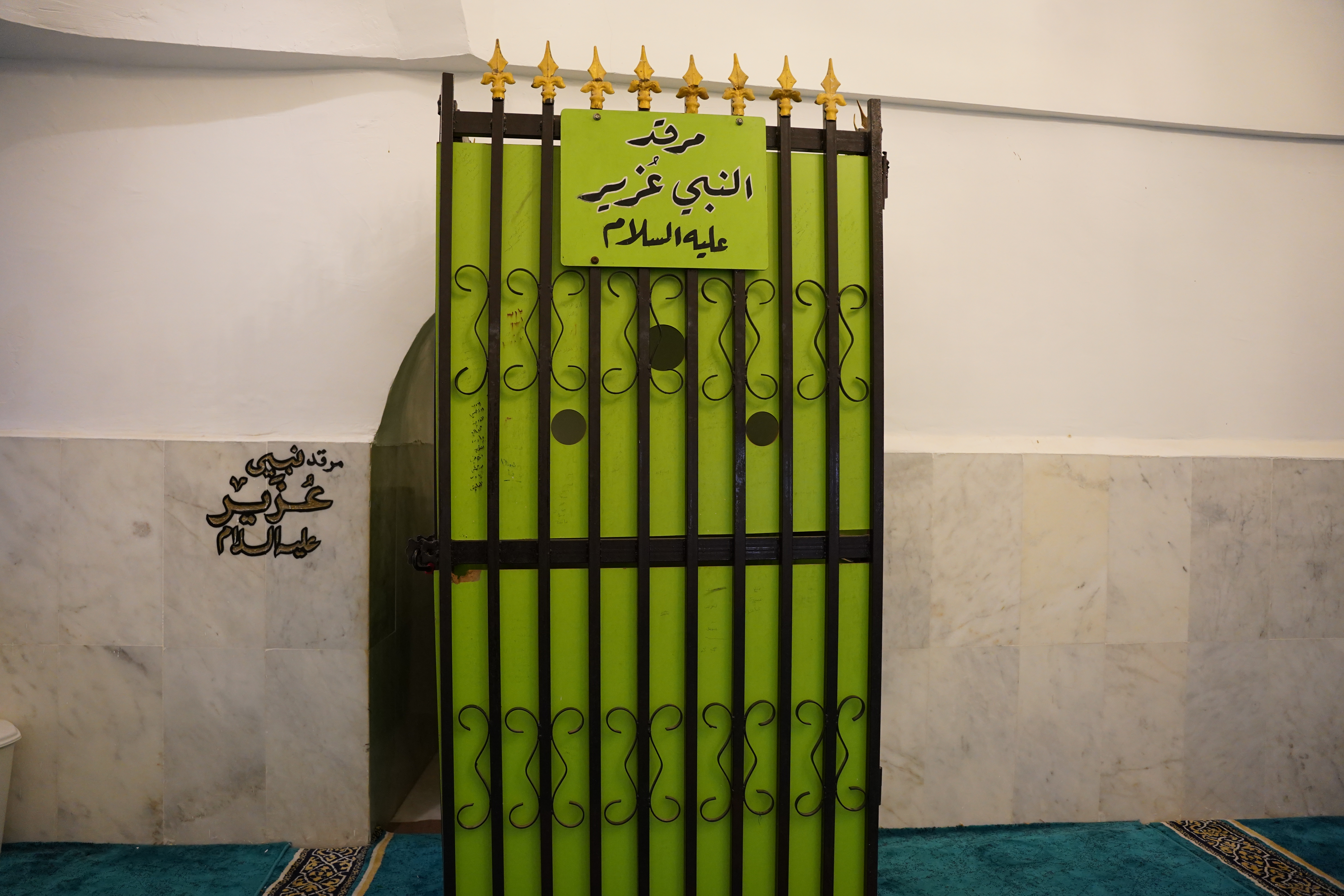
The tomb of Azariah, also known as Abednego, misidentified here as Ezra.

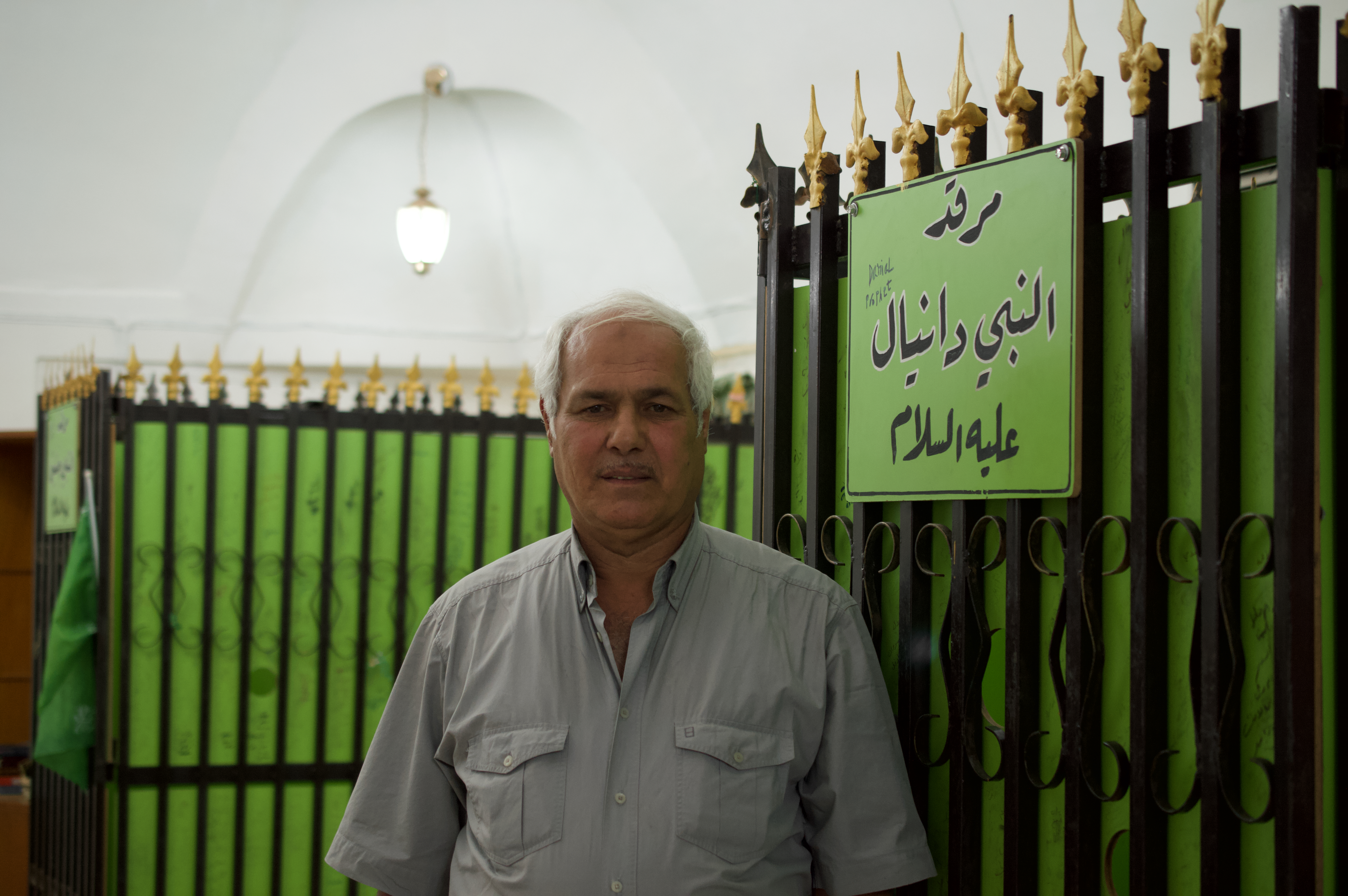
The caretaker photographed in front of two of the tombs.

== See also ==
- Tomb of Daniel
- List of mosques in Iraq
