= Blue Dome, Kirkuk =

Mausoleum in Kirkuk, Iraq

Blue Dome
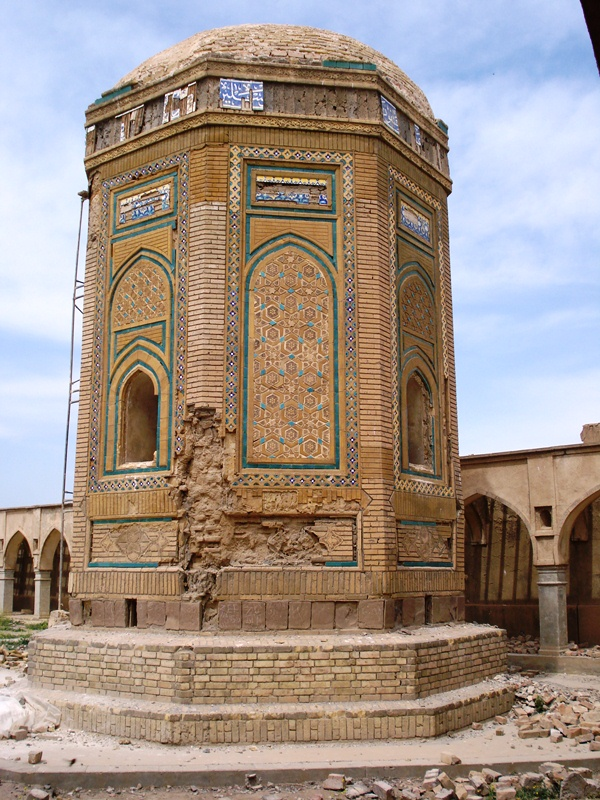
- The Blue Dome, as seen in 2012.
- Interactive map of Blue Dome
- 35°28′14″N 44°23′43″E
- Type: Mausoleum
- Location: Kirkuk, Iraq

History
- Built: 1361
- Built for: Bogdai Khatun

Site notes
- Architectural style: Jalayirid
- Restored: 1998–2003
- Governing body: Provincial government of Kirkuk Governorate

The Blue Dome (Arabic: القبة الزرقاء, lit. Qubbat al-Zarqā, Turkish: Gök Kümbet) is a mausoleum located in Kirkuk, Iraq. Built in the second half of the 14th century during the Jalayirid rule, it is part of the historic Kirkuk Citadel complex.

== History ==
The original mausoleum was built over the grave of Bogdai Khatun, a noblewoman who had died while on the way to Mecca. Bogdai Khatun was a relative of the Jalayirid ruling family, hence a grand mausoleum was commissioned in 1361 for her, as was the case with most relatives of Mongol and Turkic nobility at the time. In the modern times, especially during the Ba'athist period, the Kirkuk Citadel along with most of its monuments, including the Blue Dome, were left in a neglected state, which prompted several botched renovation works to preserve the structures between 1998 and 2003. During one of these controversial restorations, the hexagonal pointed roof over the mausoleum was demolished and then replaced with a flat blue dome of modern style that was not contemporary to architecture from the 14th century of Kirkuk.

== Architecture ==
The building is octagonal in shape, with a wider octagonal base and is situated in a courtyard of unknown purpose. Qashani tiles form decorative patterns on the exterior of the mausoleum, with an identical design on each wall, complemented with Arabic and Kurdish inscriptions and calligraphy. The main facade of the building itself is directed towards Mecca, as per Islamic burial traditions where the deceased has to be buried facing the qibla. The graves of Bogdai Khatun and her family are situated in a crypt below the cylindrical tomb building.

== See also ==
- Turbe
- Kirkuk Citadel
