= Kirkuk Citadel =

Ancient citadel and settlement in Kirkuk, Iraq

- Kirkuk, Kirkuk Governorate in Iraq
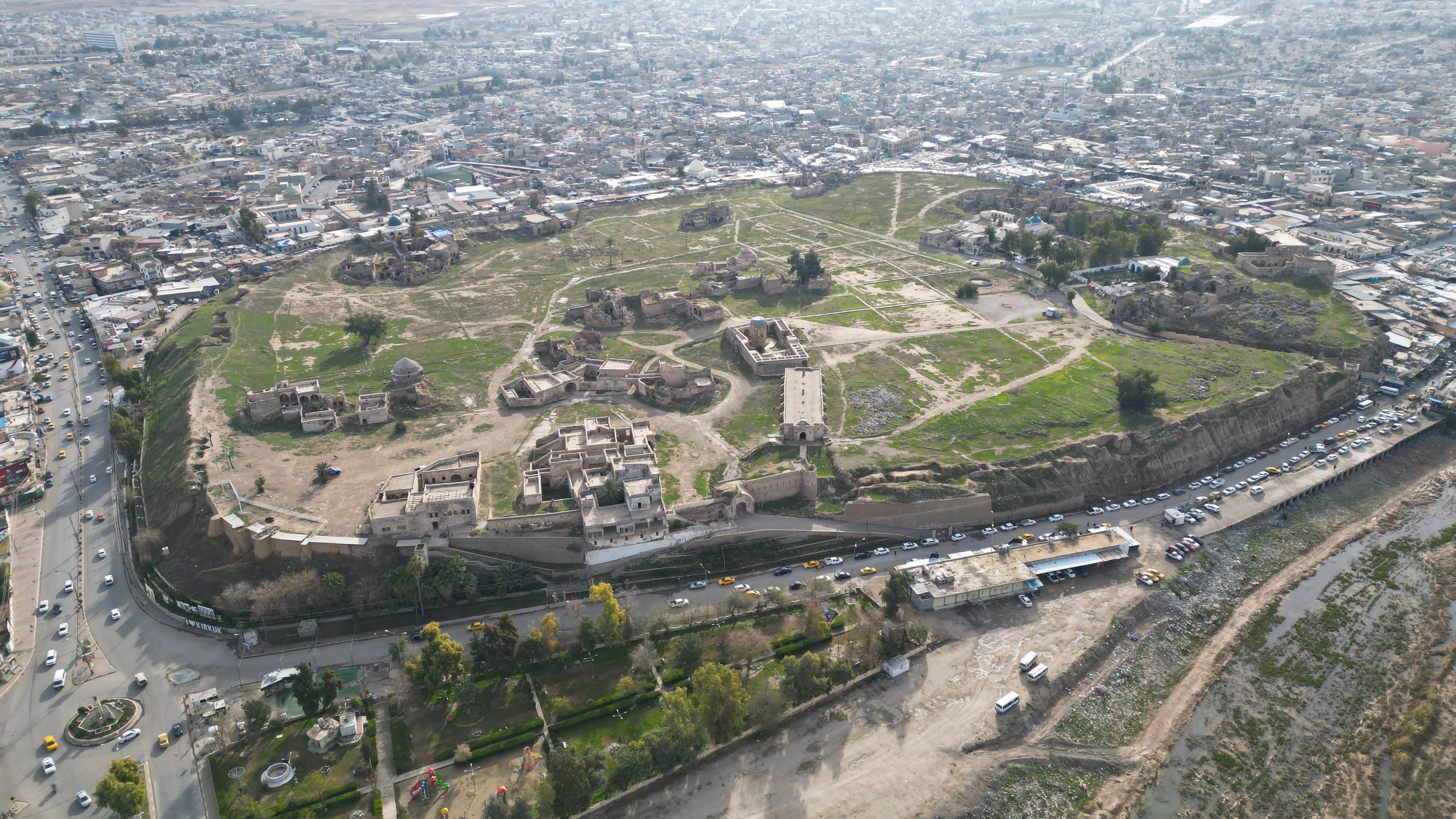
- Aerial view of the citadel as of February 2026.

Site information
- Type: Citadel and religious structures
- Owner: Government of Iraq
- Open to the public: Not always
- Condition: Partially ruined
- Managing agency: Directorate of Antiquities and Heritage; Ministry of Culture, Tourism and Antiquities (Iraq)

Location
- Location of the citadel in Iraq
- Coordinates: 35°28′11″N 44°23′45″E
- Area: 170 Iraqi dunam; 42.5 ha (105 acres)

Site history
- Built: 9th century BCE (prime); 7th century CE (current walls); 14–19th century CE (other structures)
- Built by: Neo-Assyrian Empire (prime); Ottoman Empire (current walls)
- Fate: Partially demolished in 1997

Garrison information
- Designations: UNESCO World Heritage Site tentative list (2021)

The Kirkuk Citadel (Arabic: قلعة كركوك; Kurdish: قەڵای کەرکووک; Turkish: Kerkük Kalesi) is a citadel and associated structures located in the center of Kirkuk, Iraq, and is considered to be the oldest part of the city. The citadel stands on a 40-metre-high (130 ft) tell, located on a plateau across the Khasa River. Although most of the citadel was demolished, parts of it, including mosques, tombs, and houses, still remain intact.

Historically a majority Turcoman but also a multicultural city religiously, economically, and ethnically, the citadel contained many markets, mosques, some dating back as far as the Golden Age of Islam, bearing the name of many distinguished locals, and many Sufi monasteries (Known in Iraq generally as takiyya) or Sufi establishment due to the growth of the Qadiriyya Order in the area. There are also many sites dedicated to Christian and Jewish worship. It also contains one of several sites throughout the Middle East where it is claimed that the Abrahamic Prophet Daniel is buried.

In April 2021, the 42.5-hectare (105-acre) citadel site, alongside its many surviving structures, was added to the tentative list of UNESCO World Heritage Sites due to its historical significance, authentic ancient urban fabric, and social value.

== History ==
In 1923, 51 clay tablets were found by archeologists near the citadel that revealed that the site dates back to at least the 2nd millennium BC. Later excavations in 2000 carried out by the Kirkuk Directorate of Antiquity in its northern sides revealed that its walls were built by thick adobe bricks with semicircular abutments. The topography, climate, construction materials, absence of orthogonal grids, consideration of civil aesthetics and social segregation in the citadel showed evidence that the site is a descent of the ancient Mesopotamian cities, like the Erbil Citadel and many others that shared a similar appearance. Despite these discoveries, the clear origins of the citadel are disputed; some historians believe the oldest parts of the structure were built by the nomadic Gutian people around the 2nd millennium BC, while others assert that the citadel and its mound were constructed by the Assyrian King Ashurnasirpal II between 850 and 884 BCE as a military defense line for the city.

King Seleucus I Nicator built a strong rampart with 72 towers around the 72 streets and the two entries to the citadel. A jewel of the citadel is the so-called "Red Church", with traces of mosaics dating to the period before the Islamic conquest of Iraq in the 7th century CE. It is believed that Timur visited the citadel in 1393 during his military expedition. The modern walls date from the Ottoman period.

For centuries, Kirkuk was defined by the citadel at its core. Visiting Kirkuk in 1735, an unnamed French traveler described the city as split between two main sections: the citadel, which was sparsely populated at the time, and the plains around it, which was where markets and trade was conducted. Two centuries later, another traveler, the New Zealand civil engineer A. M. Hamilton, described the citadel in his Travels in Northern Iraq book:

It is an ancient place. Successive cities, built one upon the other, have raised mound which stands well above the surrounding plain. Only the main residential quarter is today contained within the wall built upon the mound, for the straggling bazaar had long ago overflowed onto the flat land by the river where it is at times threatened by widespread floods. In spite of the bombardment of floodwaters, the bridge, of a series of short-span masonry arches, is one of the few built during the Turkish regime that still stands.

=== Destruction and neglect ===
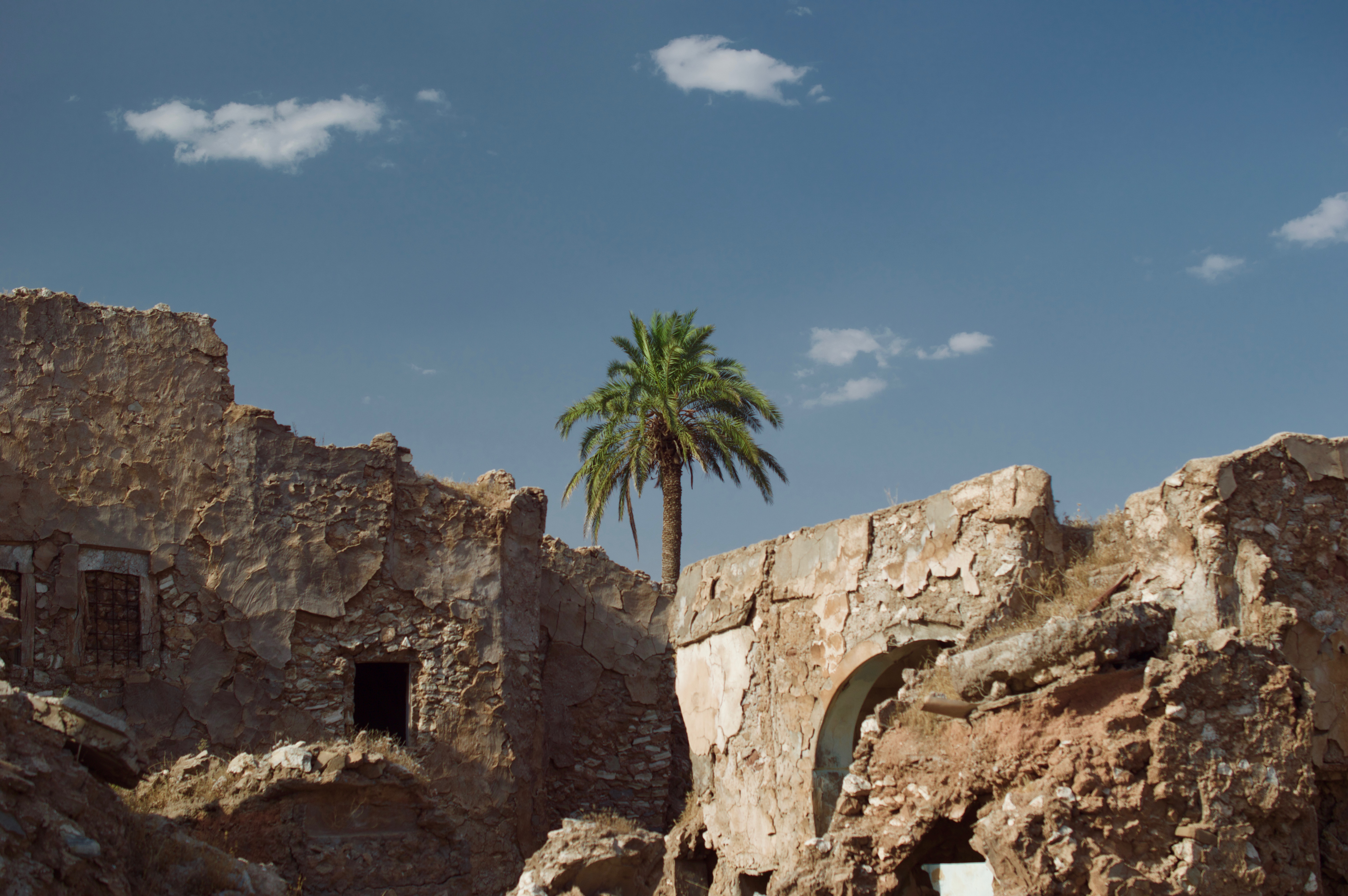
A palm tree rising over the ruins of the Kirkuk Citadel.

In a cassette tape found in 1991 during the uprisings allegedly recorded by Iraqi military general, Ali Hassan al-Majid, while he was the city's governor stated that he wanted to force Arabization on the city's Turcomen population and character, which began with the renaming of the area to "Ta'mim." This was part of the Iraqi Ba'ath Party's Arabization policy which had begun in 1974.

In 1998, 250 million dinars were allocated for the demolition of the citadel's quarters under the supervision of general Iyad Futayyih. The Newspaper Sawt al-Ta'mim claimed that the campaign was an effort to "remove rubble and maintain the archaeological sites that will be preserved in the Kirkuk Citadel." The people of the citadel, including Turcomans and Chaldeans who have been living in it for hundreds of years, were forced out. Almost all the residential buildings in the existing historical urban fabric were then demolished, keeping only a few out of around 800 houses and some important monuments. Iraqi opinionist, Nusrat Mardan, criticized the international community in 2003 for ignoring the destruction of the Kirkuk Citadel yet focusing greatly on the destruction of the Buddhas of Bamiyan statues in Afghanistan by the Taliban.

Between 1998 and 2003, inappropriate methods and materials were used to renovate the remaining structures. Nine isolated monuments and nine small houses considered to be valuable remain of the old city on the tell. Despite the large scale of the loss and endangered status, the renovated and authentic architecture of the city remains in the surviving monuments. The houses contain architecture different from ones found in Baghdad or Erbil while the religious structures are important pilgrim sites such as the Mosque of the Prophet Daniel. As of March 2025, parts of the citadel were at risk of further deterioration due to severe neglect despite calls from some of the people of Kirkuk for a joint intervention.

== Surviving structures ==
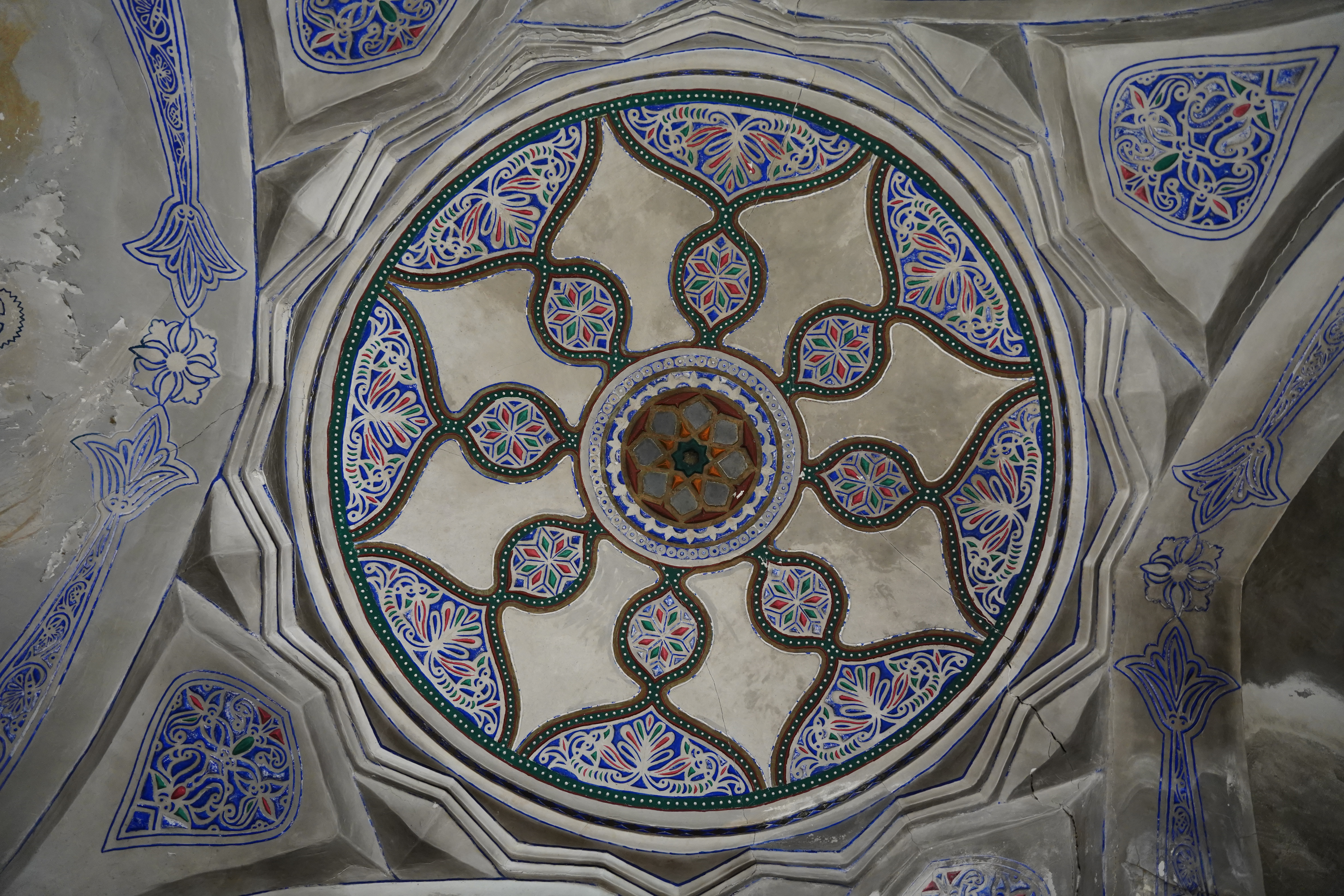
The interior of a dome that can be found inside the Dar Abdullah Effendi Yaqubi Evi.

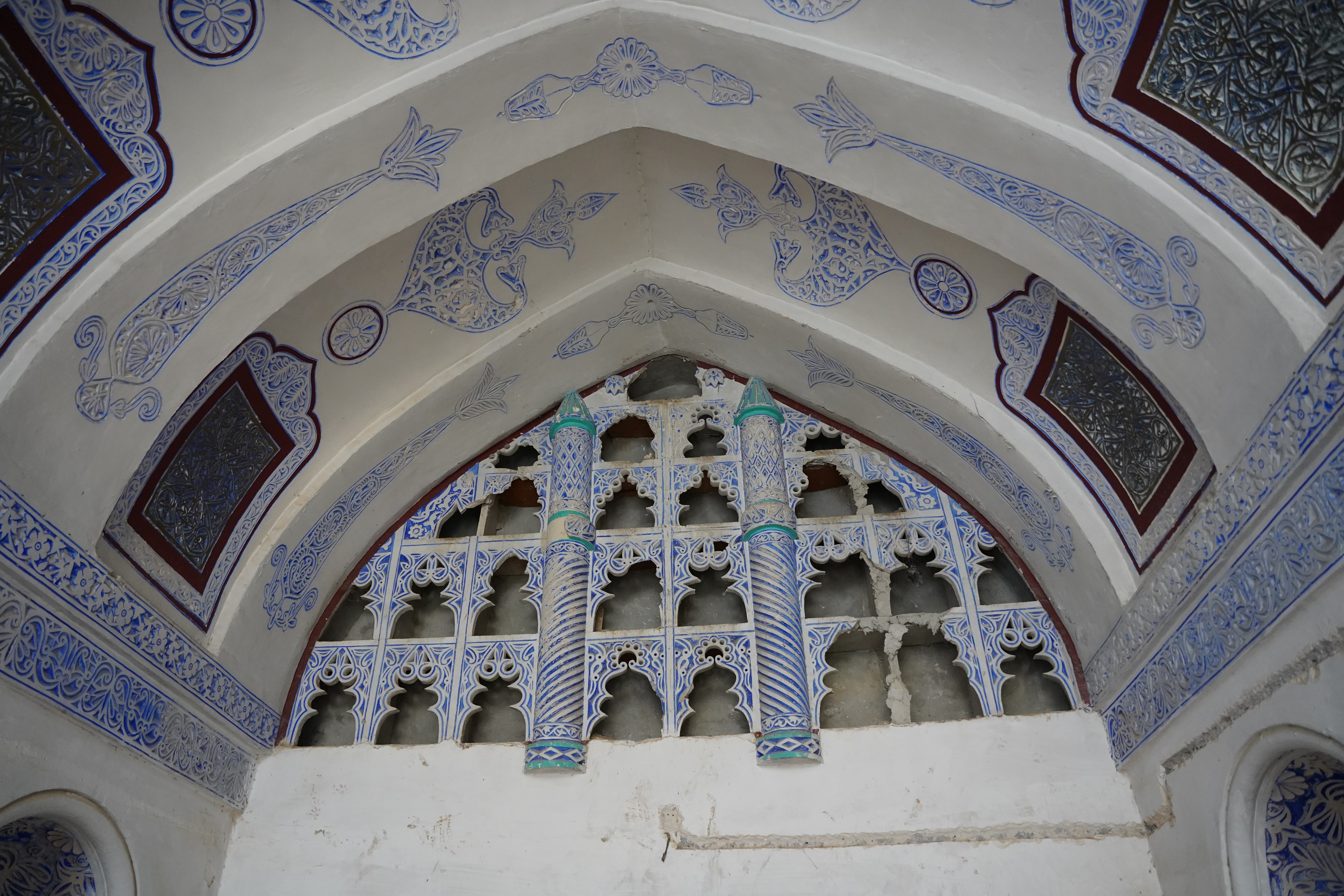
A chamber with a chini-khana decorated in Islamic decorations inside the Dar al-Tayfur.

The Kirkuk Citadel contained three main neighborhoods. These were al-Maidan Neighborhood from the north, al-Qal'a Neighborhood in the center, and al-Hammam Neighborhood from the south. The citadel, beyond its fortifications, contains a number of other structures including many mosques, heritage houses, tombs, religious complexes, and markets. Most of these locations have been documented by UNESCO. The religious sites are notable pilgrim and worship sites for both for Muslims and Christians.

=== Al-Ariyyan Mosque ===
Located in the former al-Hammam Neighborhood of the fortress, al-Ariyyan Mosque (Arabic: جامع العريان) dates back to 1142 AH, as evidenced by the stone piece fixed in its entrance. The mosque is distinguished by its architecture. The pulpit of the mosque was built with plaster and stone, and its sides were decorated with plaster decorations that represent geometric shapes, including six-pointed stars surrounded by a frame of foliate decoration. The mihrab decorated with colorful floral and geometric designs in various colors. There are lower parts of those decoration, as floral designs appeared beneath them when removed, above which are the words of the 37th verse of Surat Al Imran: “So her Lord accepted her graciously and blessed her with a pleasant upbringing—entrusting her to the care of echariah. Whenever Zechariah visited her in the sanctuary, he found her supplied with provisions.”

=== Houses and bazaars ===
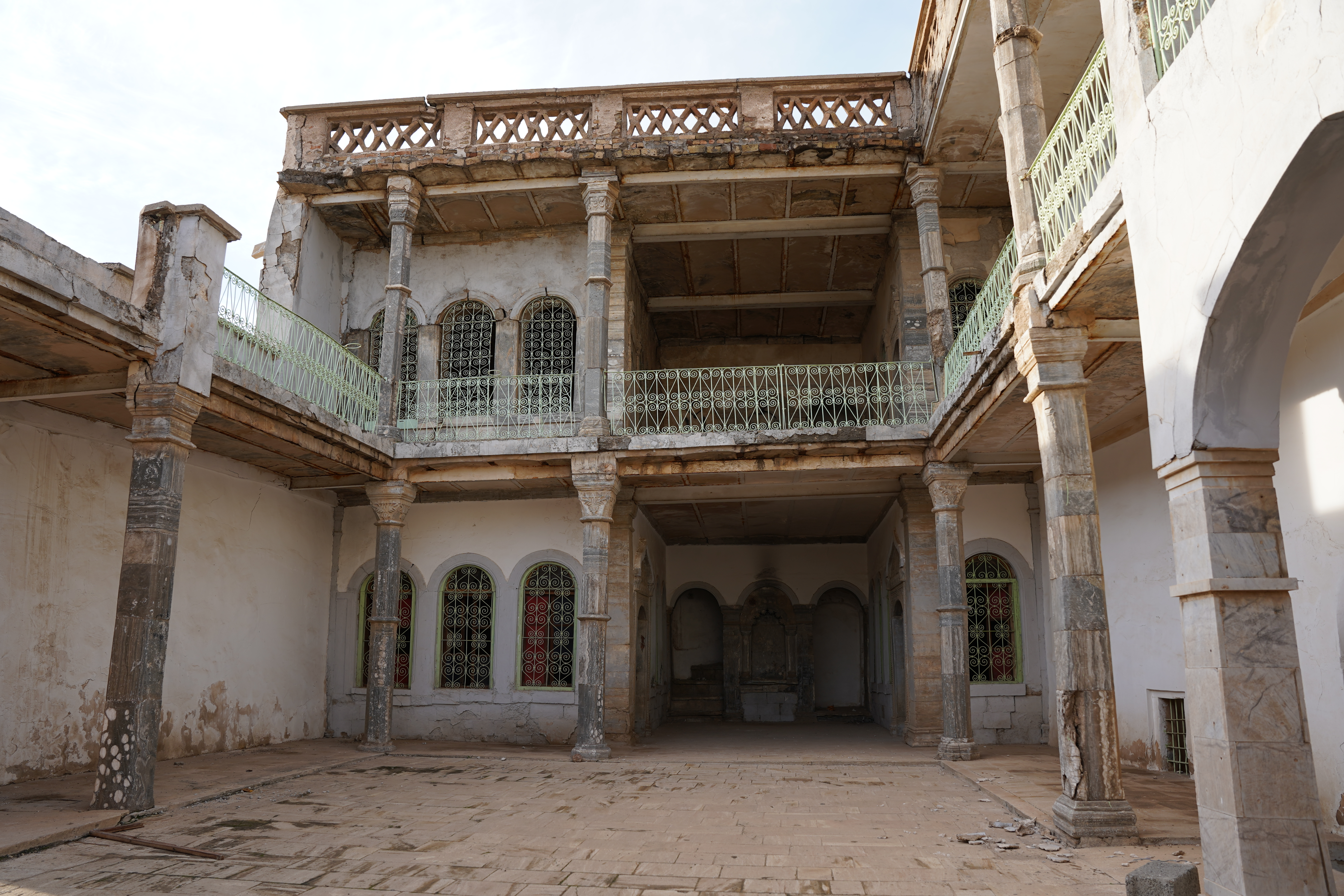
The ruins of Dar al-Tayfur

The tell contains many heritage houses that still survive alongside their architecture and design. Among these houses is the Dar al-Tayfur, which is divided into several floors. On the upper floor is a balcony overlooking the courtyard of the first floor from three sides. It has delicate marble columns, and its windows are framed with decorations. It has a second door that leads to the second house, which includes large rooms divided into sections. The third house, nicknamed the Bayt al-'Aris, has a façade with a small balcony and a rectangular room. All three houses contain balconies that overlook the bazaar building which contains three rooms for stores.

=== Tomb of Gok Kunbet ===
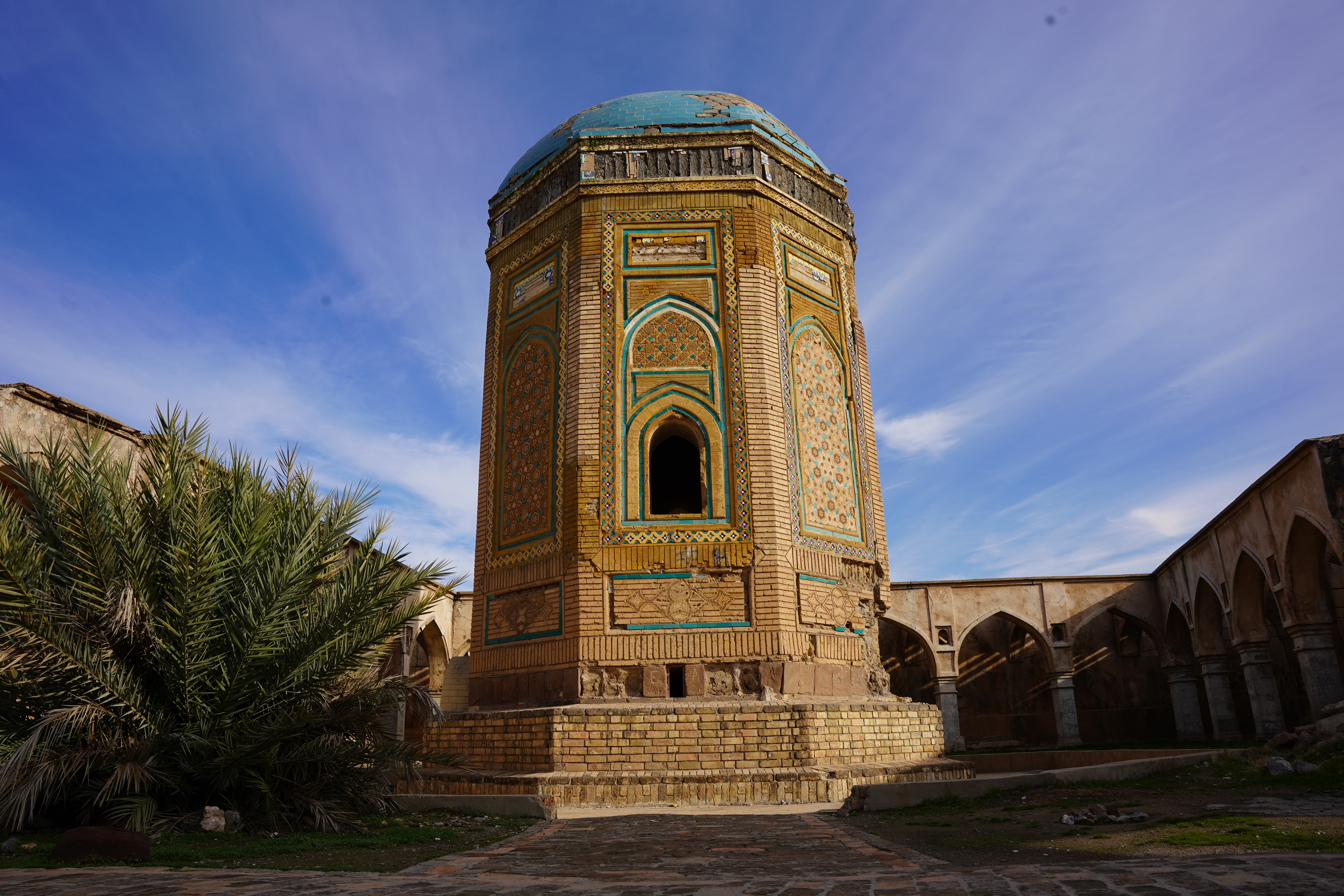
A general view of the Blue Dome within the complex.

The Tomb of Gok Kunbet, also known as the Blue Dome, is a mausoleum and a courtyard surrounded by arcades that once belonged to an old traditional house in the area. The structure dates back to 1361, during the period of the Jalayirid Sultanate. The main structure of the Blue Dome is octagonal built with mudbricks and decorated with brick panels around its facades. During one restoration effort in the 1980s, a pyramid-shaped dome was added to the top but was later removed and replaced back with the blue dome. The tomb of the mausoleum is dedicated to a woman who passed away in 1361 during the early period of the sultanate. The Blue Dome is located close to the northern gate of the citadel.

The former inhabitants of the citadel believed that the tiles used in its decoration were green in color, but an examination of the remaining parts of the tiles showed that they were in fact blue in color. Because of this misconception, the structure is also known as the Green Dome by some.

=== Tombs of Prophet Daniel, Azariah, and Hananiah ===
Inside the Mosque of Prophet Daniel, there are tombs allegedly containing the tomb of the Abrahamic prophet Daniel, as well as the tombs of two of his companions, Azariah and Hananiah. The tombs are topped by two blue domes and a minaret that originated from the end of the era of the Mongol Empire. The site used to be a synagogue, but it was converted into a church, and then eventually into a mosque. The first cemetery in Kirkuk is situated adjacent to the shrine. It contains the tombs of people who respected Daniel and aspired to be buried next to him.

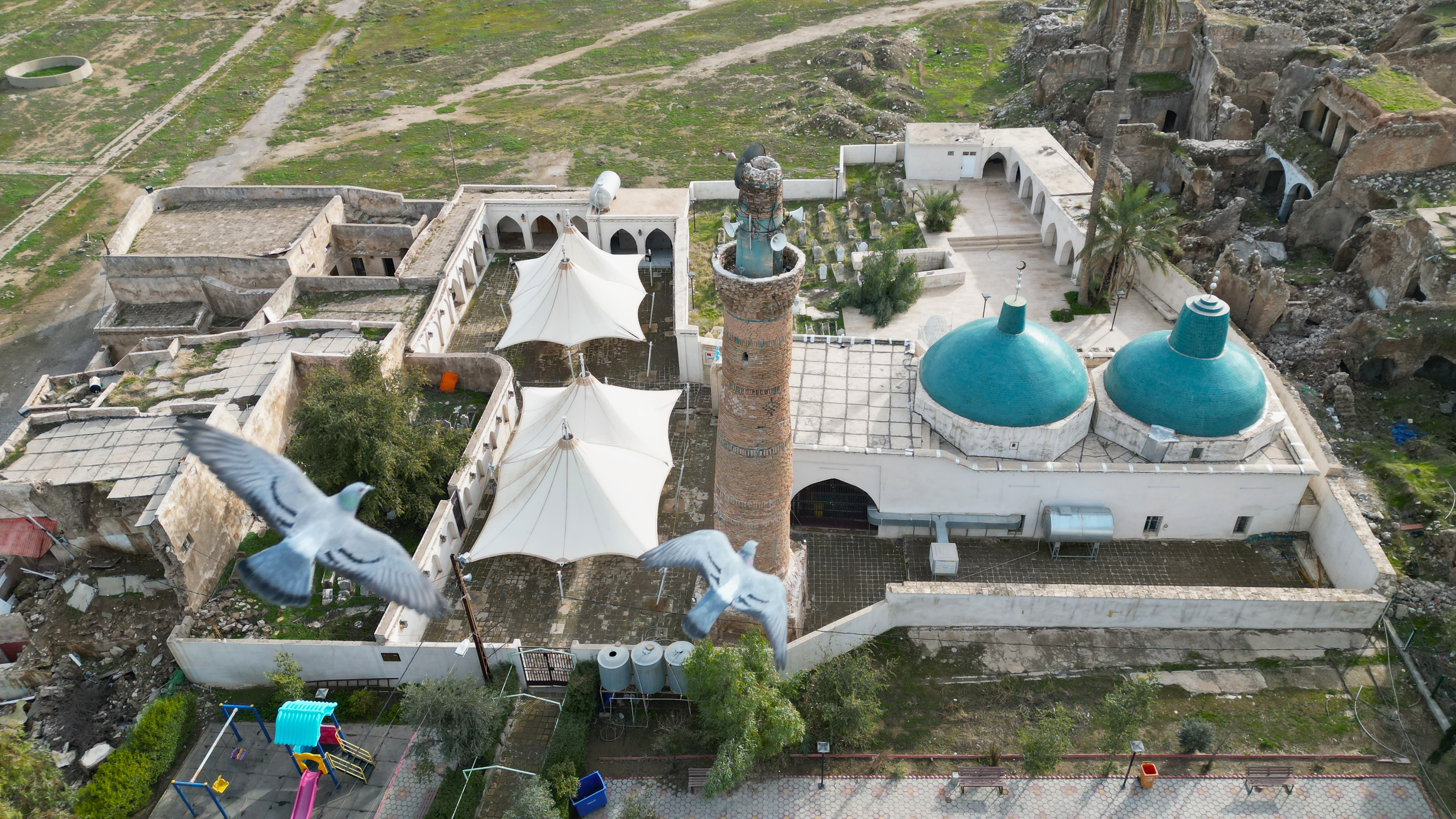
An aerial view of the Mosque of the Prophet Daniel

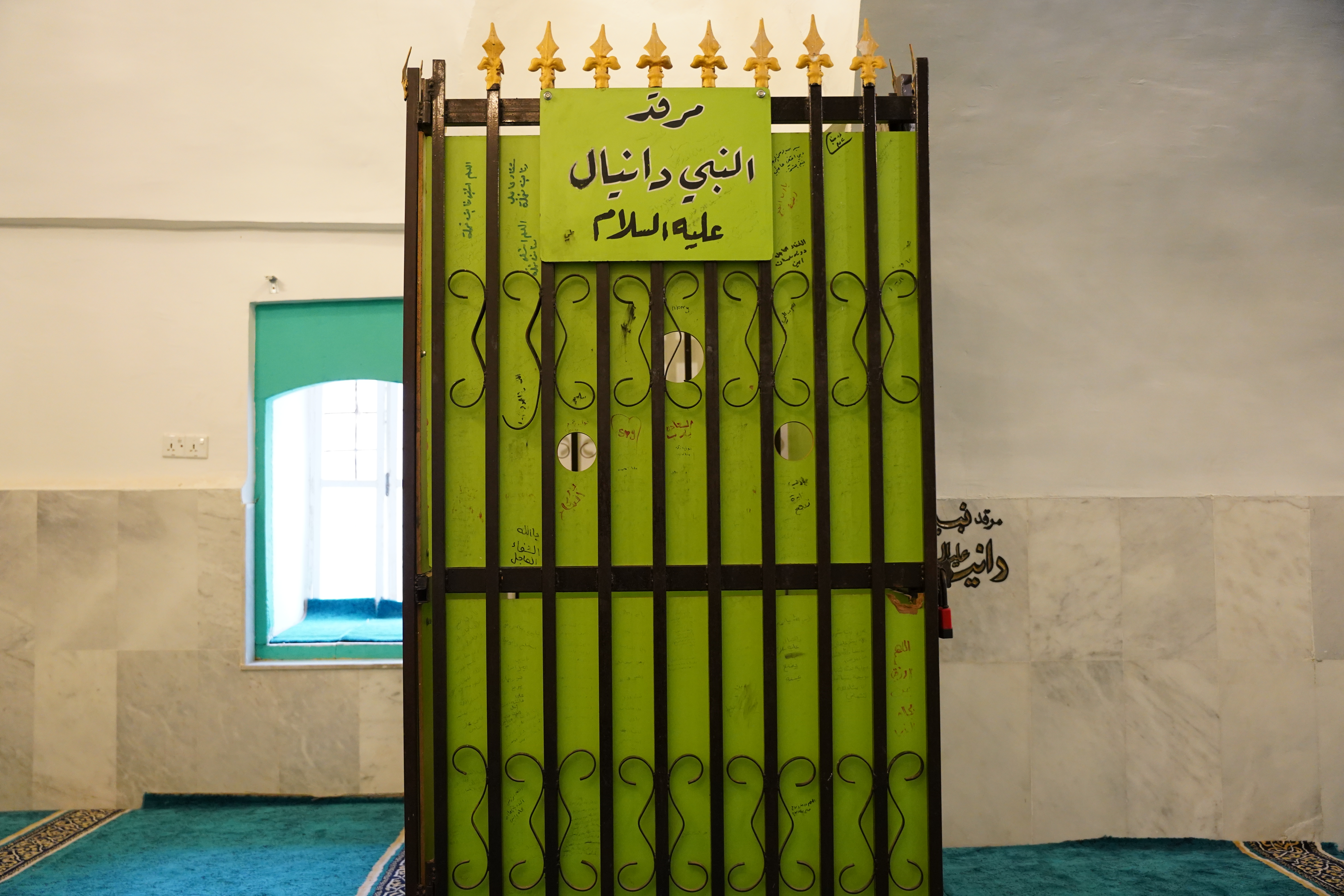
The tomb of Daniel

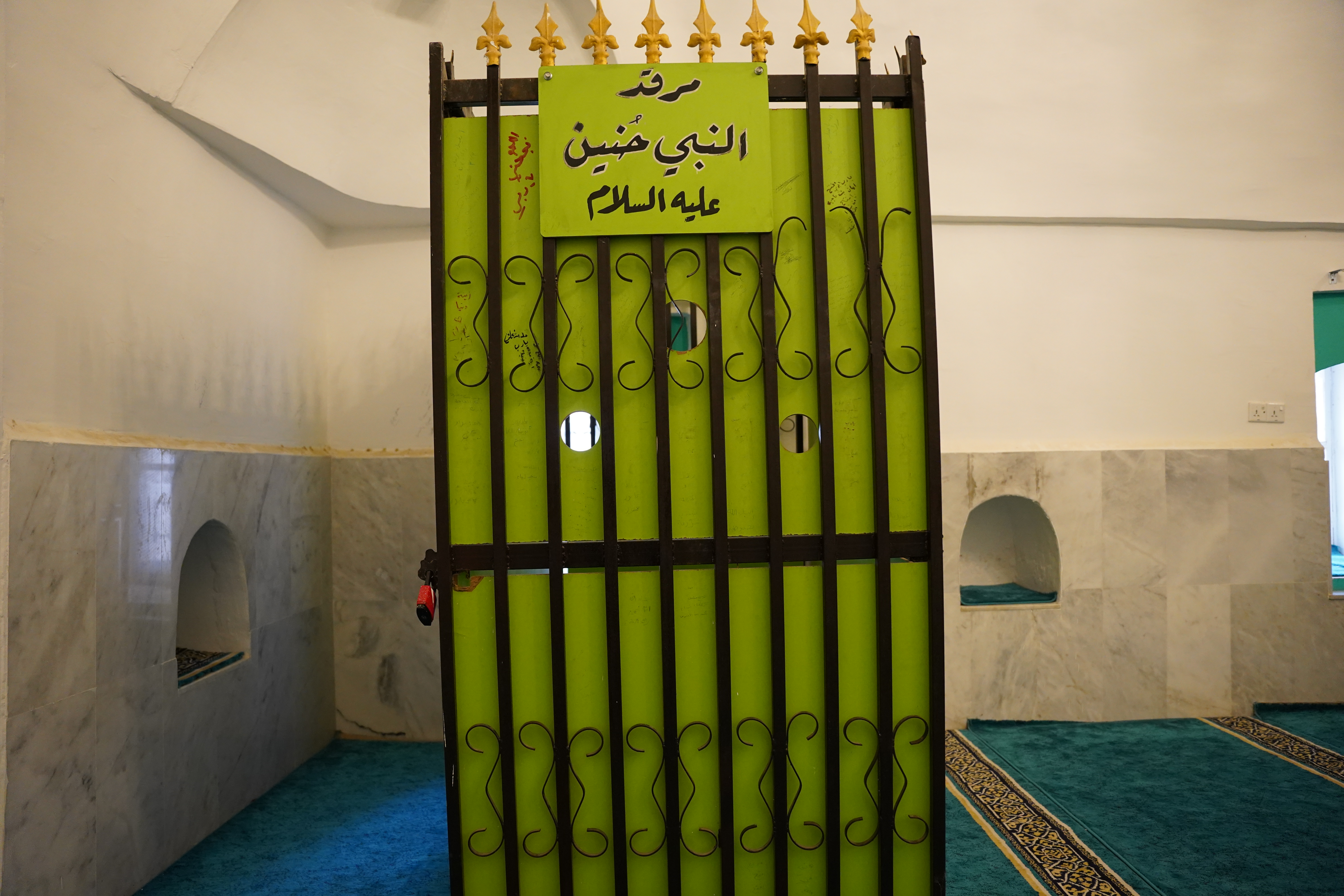
The tomb of Hananiah

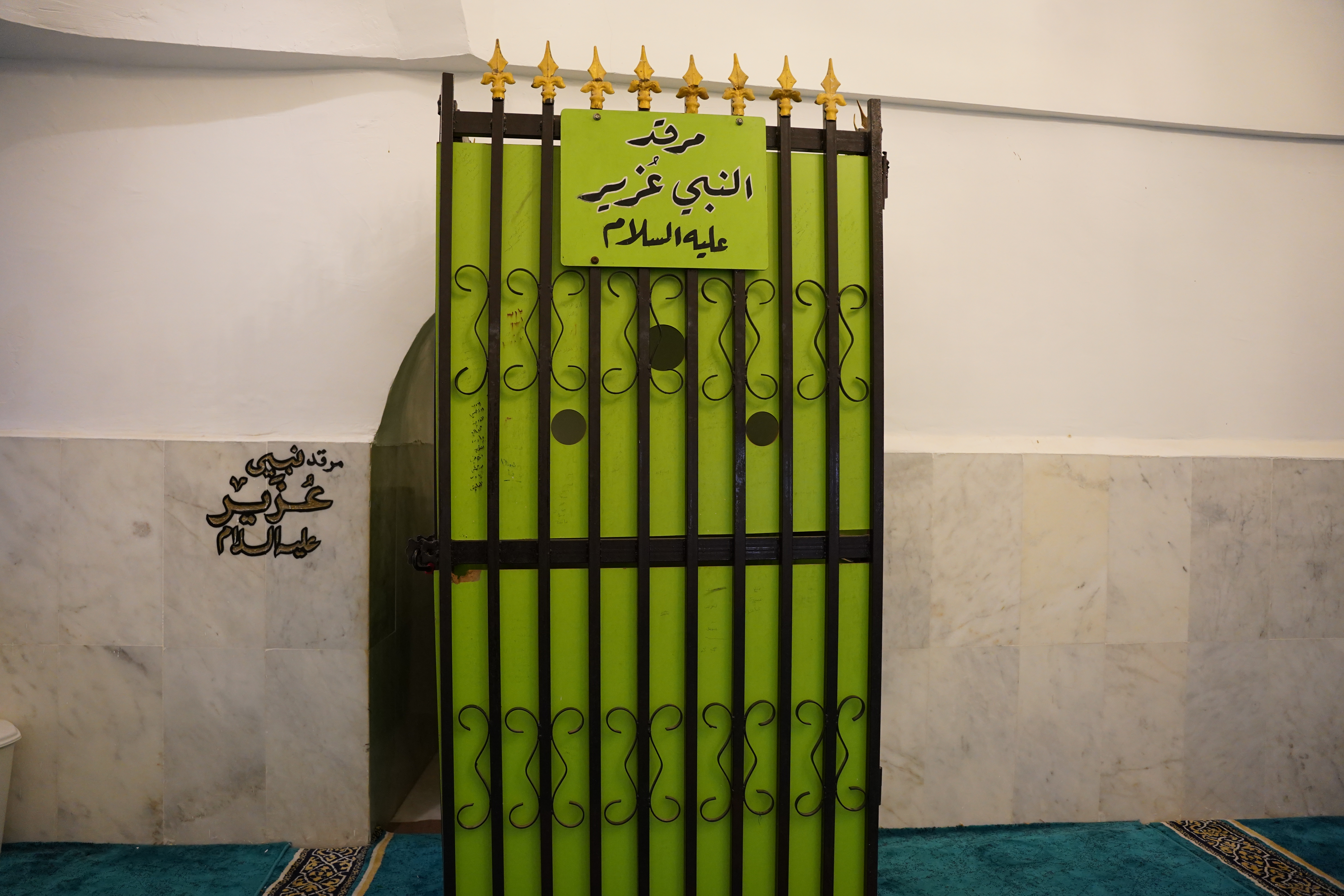
The tomb of Azariah

=== Ulu Camii Mosque ===
The Ulu Camii Mosque, translated from old Turkish as the Great Mosque and also known as the Mosque of the Virgin Mary, is the main mosque of the Kirkuk Citadel and among its last actively functioning. The mosque holds Islamic prayers and the Friday prayers weekly, and people from around the area gather here for the prayers. The mosque is rectangular in shape and contains a blue dome. There was also a minaret connected to the site on the east side, but only its base survives.

=== Umm al-Ahzan Cathedral ===
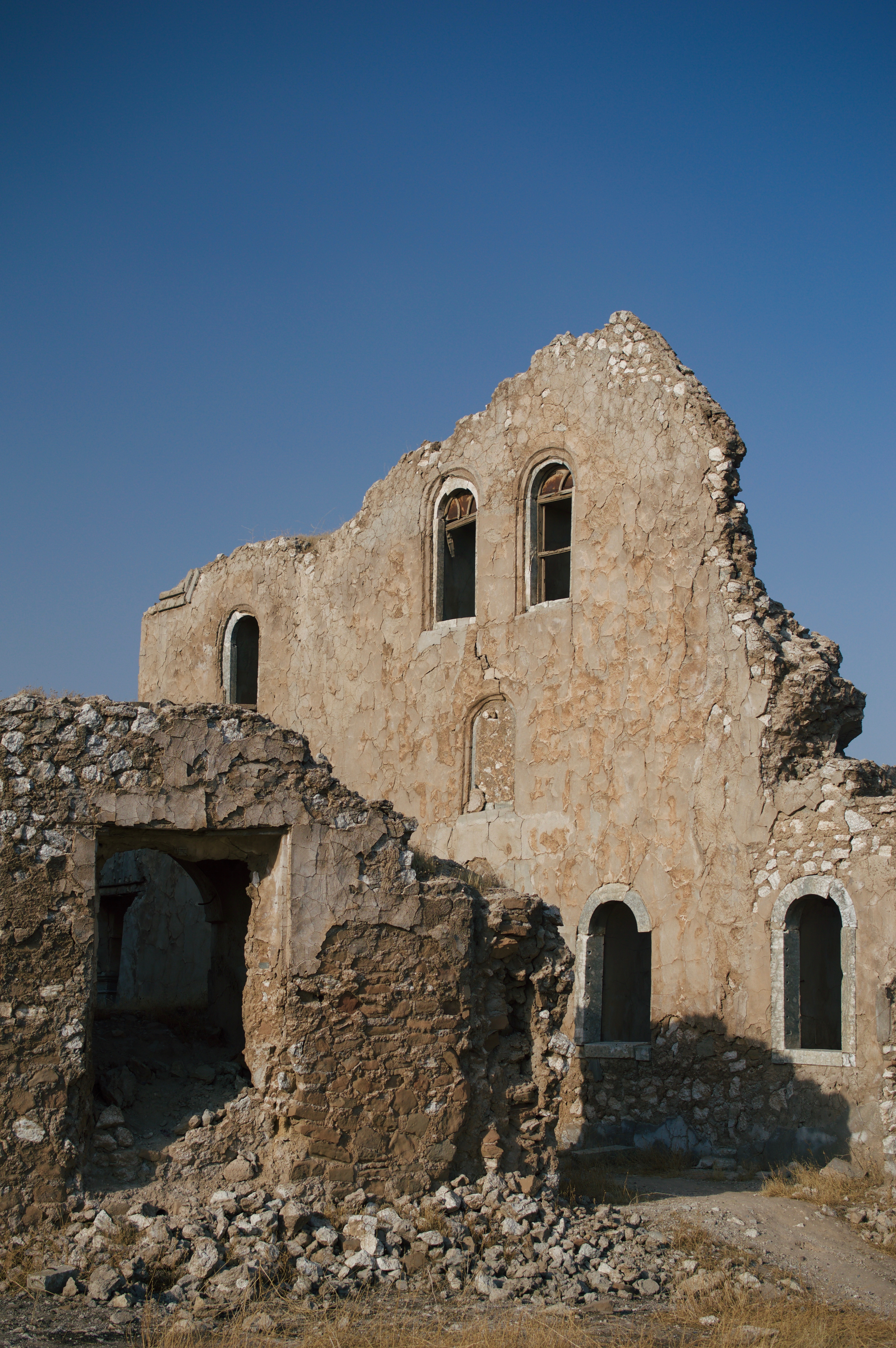
Ruins of the Umm al-Ahzan Cathedral.

Umm al-Ahzan Cathedral (Arabic: كاتدرائية أم الأحزان) is a 19th century Chaldean cathedral built at the time of Chaldean Patriarch Joseph VI Audo and consecrated in 1862 under the name of Mother of Sorrows (or Our Lady of Seven Sorrows). This cathedral shares the same name with the Chaldean cathedral-church in Baghdad built in 1843, the Cathedral of Our Lady of Sorrows. The cathedral was built to relocate Chaldean Christian activities from the village of Koria to the Kirkuk Citadel due to the population of Christians in the tell. Currently, the cathedral is in ruins and, despite its heritage value, there hasn't been any attempts to preserve it or rebuild it.

The cathedral was notorious for its poor construction even prior to the events of 1997. In 1961, the Patriarch Raphael Rabban ordered work to consolidate the building but was unsuccessful. The main concerns with the cathedral's construction was the climate variations, humidity, incorrect use of cement, and the heavy vault residing on five pillars. Currently, documents and objects previously housed within the cathedral are on display at the archdiocese’s museum.

== See also ==
- Citadel of Erbil
- Military history of Iraq
- List of castles in Iraq
