= Abdul Rahman Mustafa =

Kurdish politician (born 1951)

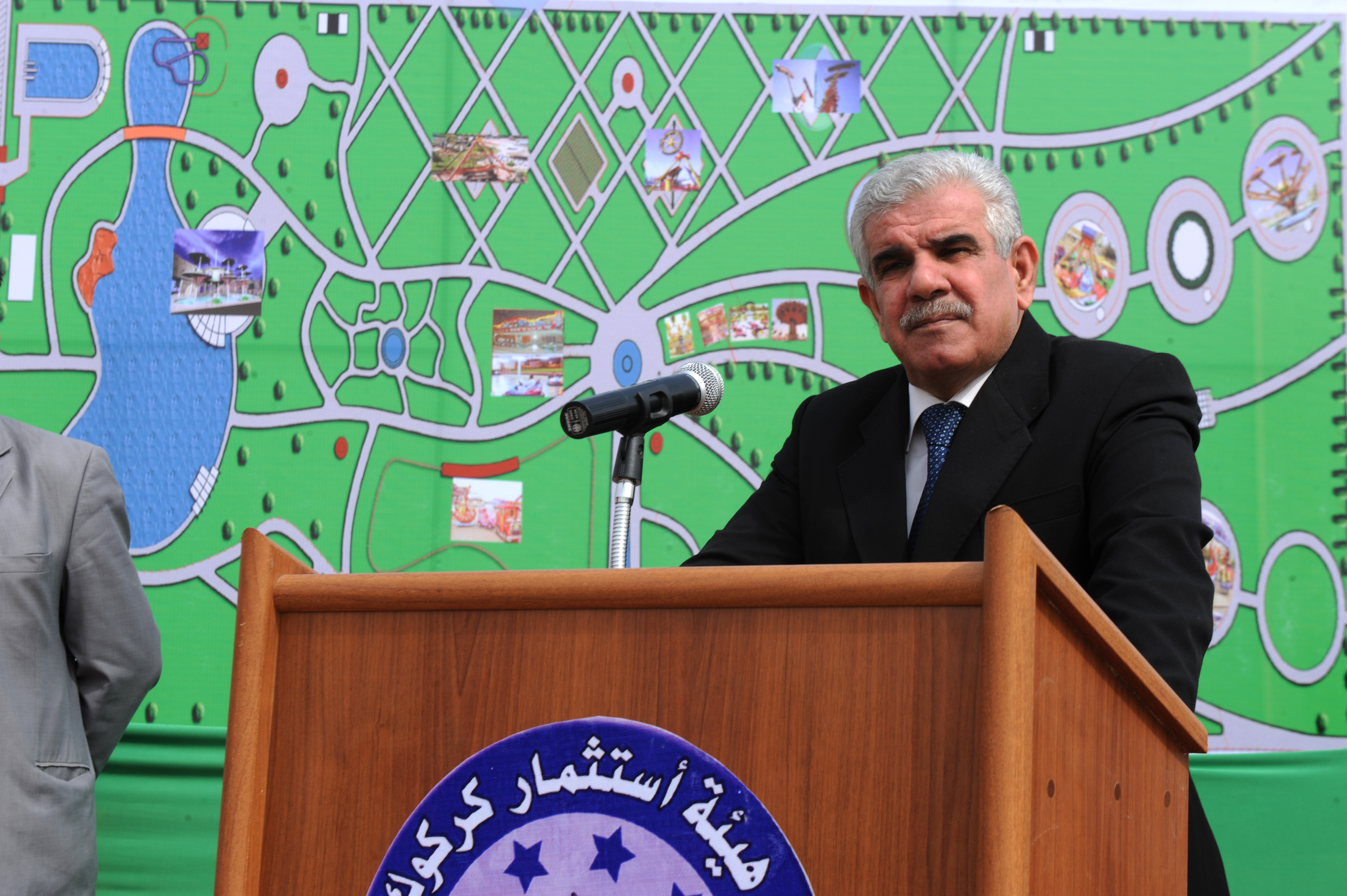
- Abdul Rahman Mustafa (2010)

Governor of Kirkuk
- In office 2003 – 3 April 2011
- Deputy: Ismail Ahmed Rajab Al Hadidi (2003-2005); Rakan Al-Jabouri (2005-2011)
- Succeeded by: Najmiddin Karim

Personal details
- Born: August 9, 1951 (age 75) Kirkuk, Iraq
- Citizenship: Iraq
- Party: Kurdistani Coalition
- Other political affiliations: Kurdistan List (2009–2013)
- Spouse: Peri Saber Ahmed
- Education: University of Baghdad
- Profession: Lawyer, civil engineer

Abdul Rahman Mustafa is an Iraqi Kurdish politician who served as the governor of Kirkuk, was elected in 2003 by multiethnic Kirkuk City Council under supervision of Coalition Provisional Authority in Post-Saddam Hussein Iraq. Has a law degree from Baghdad University. Visited Dallas, Texas as part of partners for peace, an International Goodwill agreement with Dallas.

After years of an Arab dominated government under Saddam Hussein, many Kurds celebrated the election of a Kurdish political representative. Abdel Rahman Mustafa repeatedly denies allegation from Turkey and some Turkmen representative that any attempts have been made to change the demographic character of Kirkuk or to "re-kurdify" the city after Arabization program under the former Saddam Hussein regime.

In 2006, there was an unsuccessful assassination attempt aimed at Mustafa by a suicide bomber, but he managed to survive.

Mustafa submitted his resignation from his position as governor of Kirkuk in early 2011, citing the numerous problems facing Kirkuk and problems faced when trying to satisfy different parties in the province.
