= Kirkuk =

City in Kirkuk Governorate, Iraq

Kirkuk كركوك (Arabic)
- City
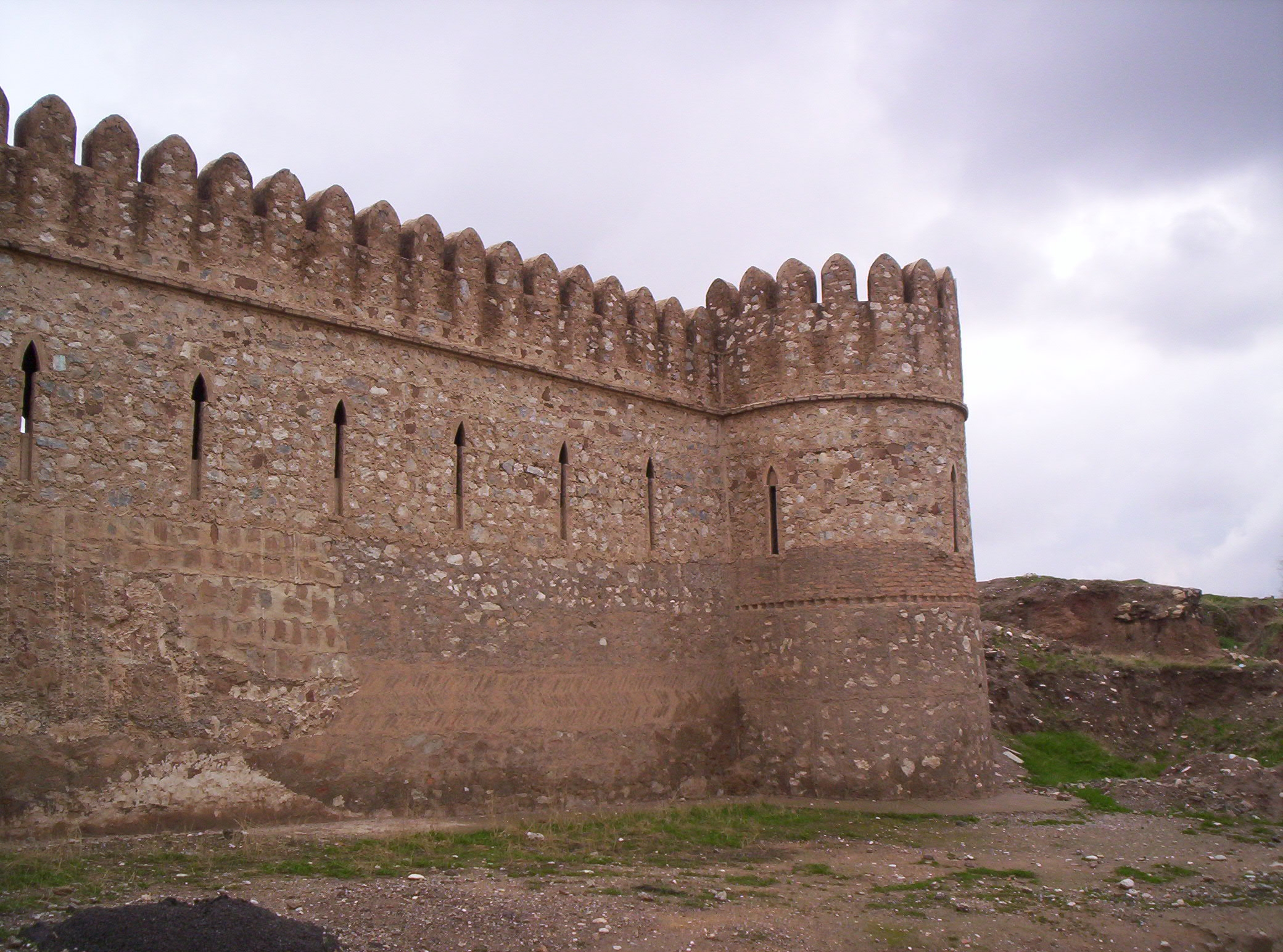
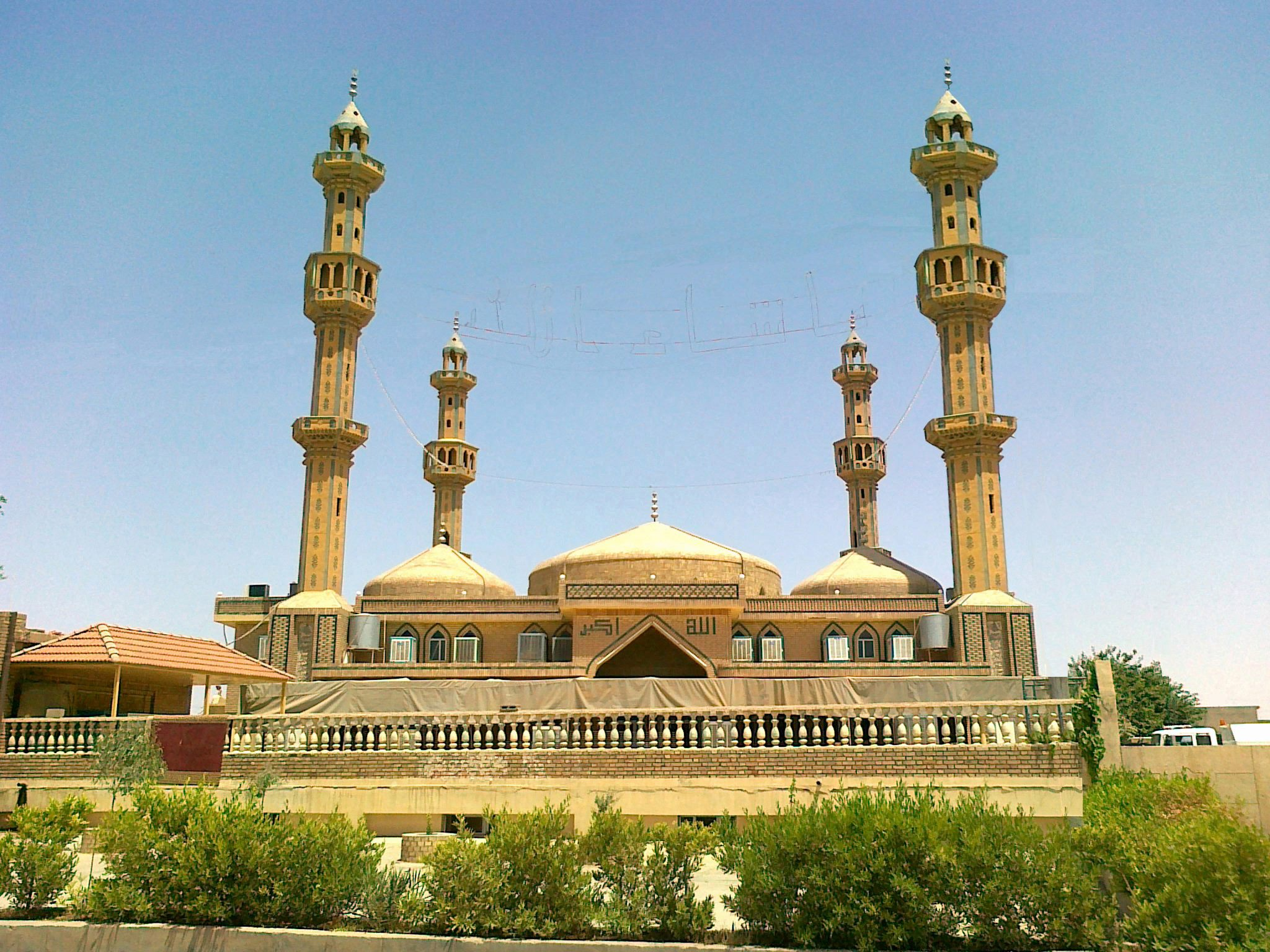
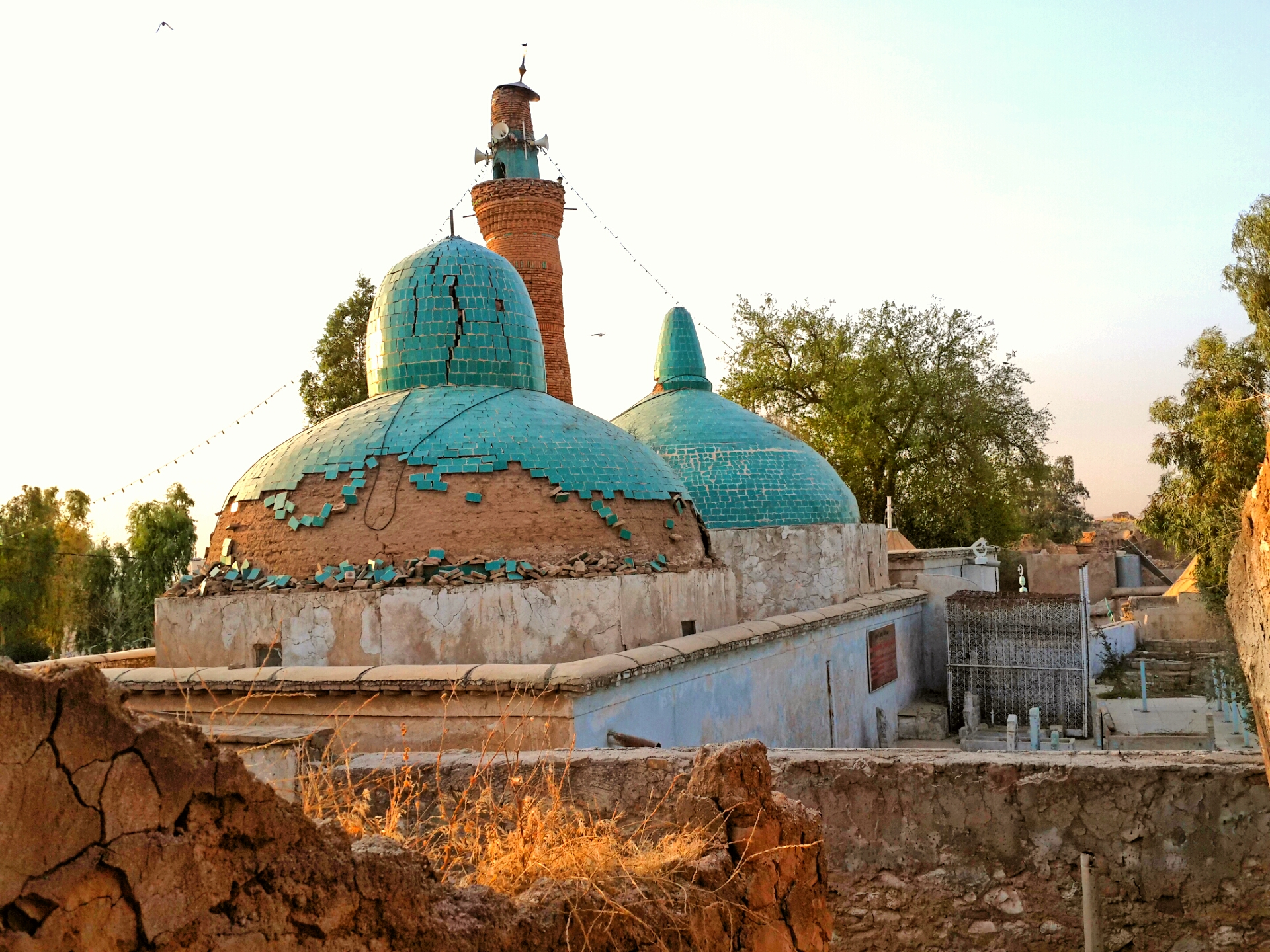
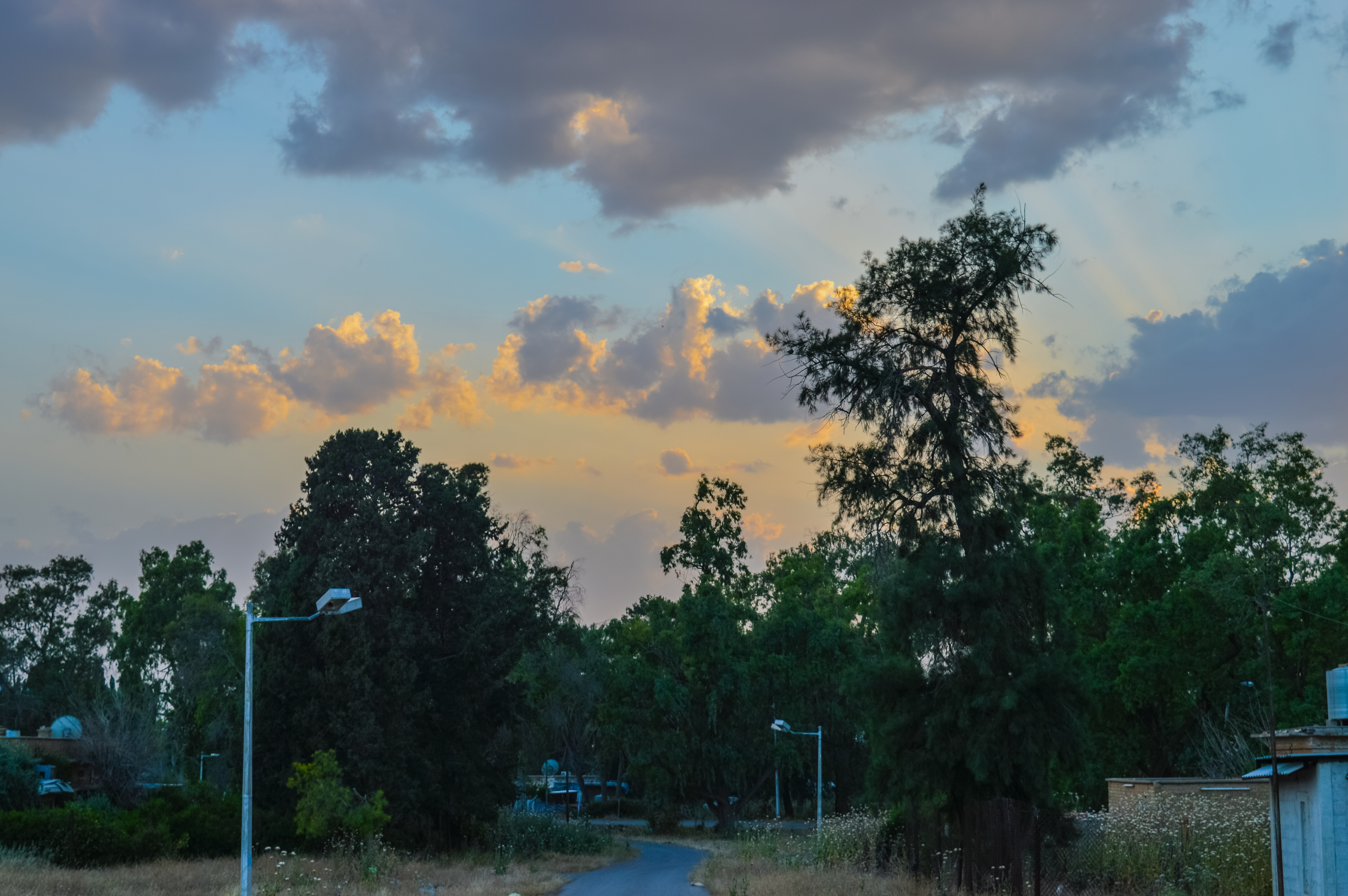
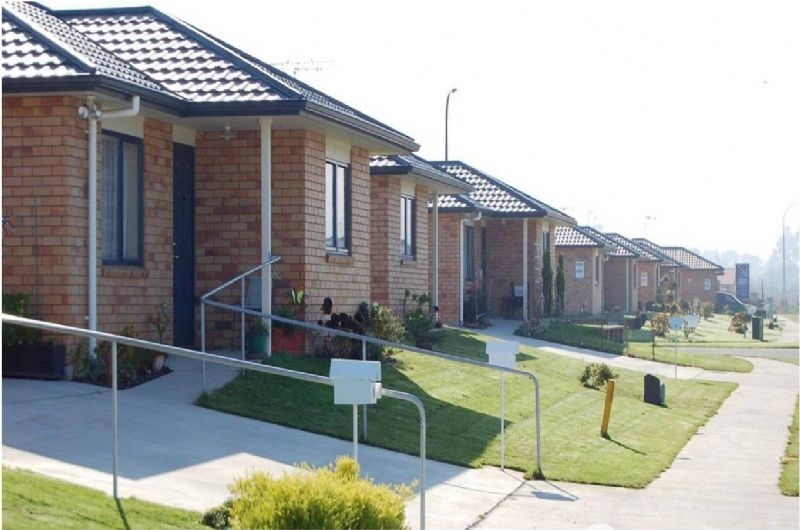
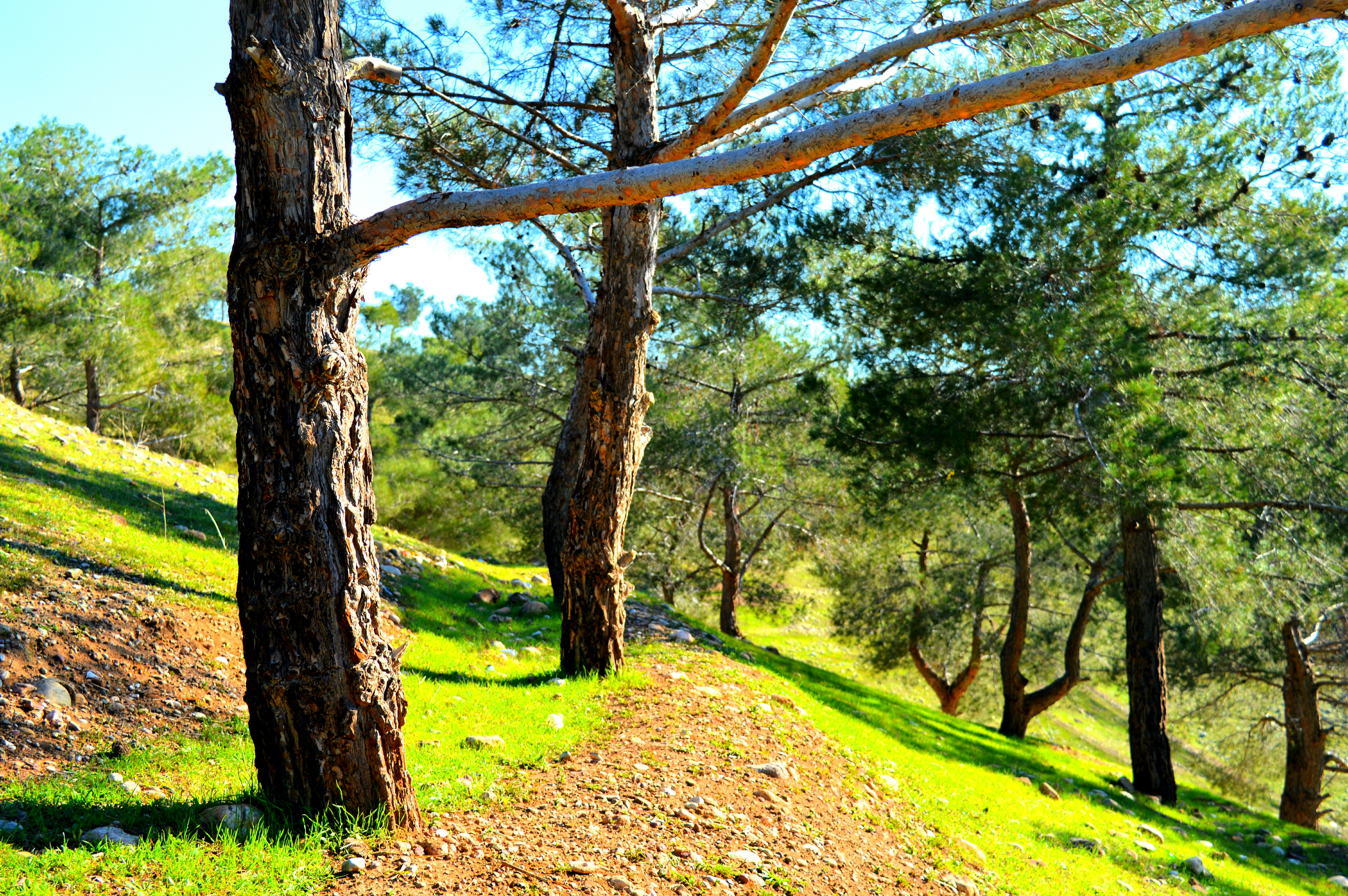
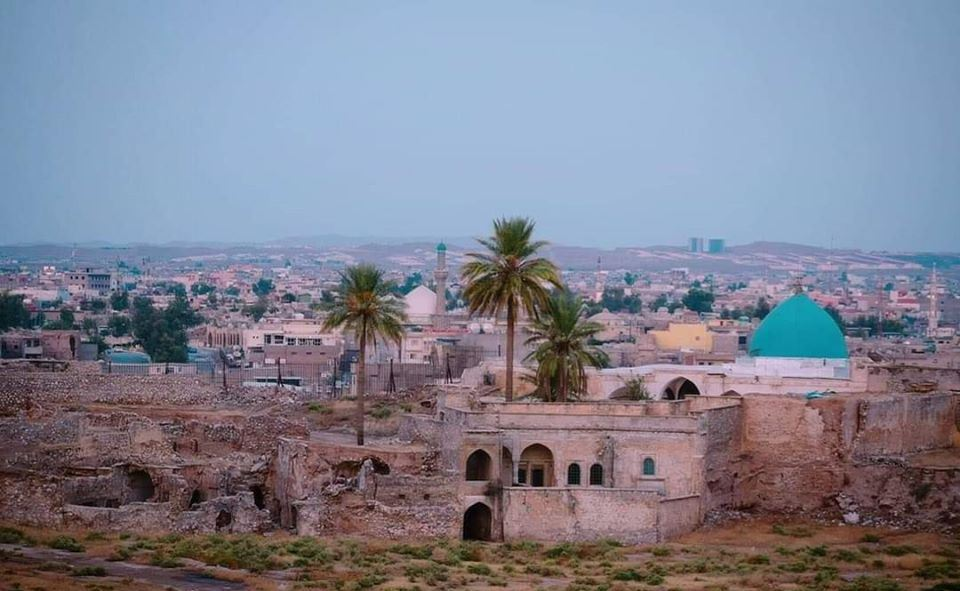

- Location within Iraq
- Coordinates: 35°28′0″N 44°19′0″E
- Country: Iraq
- Governorate: Kirkuk
- District: Kirkuk
- Elevation: 350 m (1,150 ft)

Population (2024)
  - Total: 1,249,197
- Time zone: UTC+03:00 (AST)

Kirkuk (Arabic: كركوك, romanized: Kirkūk; Kurdish: کەرکووک, romanized: Kerkûk; Syriac: ܟܪܟܘܟ, romanized: Kerkouk; Turkish: Kerkük) is a major city in northern Iraq, serving as the capital of the Kirkuk Governorate. The city is home to a diverse population of Kurds, Iraqi Turkmens and Arabs, as well as smaller numbers of Assyrians. Kirkuk sits on the ruins of the original Kirkuk Citadel which sits near the Khasa River.

Due to its diverse population, shaped by various forms of demographic engineering such as Arabization, the status of Kirkuk is highly contested and has led to recurring disputes. Jalal Talabani described Kirkuk as "the Jerusalem of Kurdistan," emphasizing its central symbolic and political importance to Kurds, while the government of Iraq has instead portrayed the city as a "small version of Iraq," presenting it as a model for coexistence among the country’s diverse communities. Turkmen, meanwhile, regard Kirkuk as a historic city of theirs. Following the adoption of the 2005 Iraqi Constitution, Kirkuk was designated a disputed territory under Article 140, requiring normalization of demographics, a census, and a referendum to decide whether it belongs to the Kurdistan Region or remains under Iraqi authority. Intended to be completed by 2007, the process remains unresolved, leaving the city's status in limbo.

== Etymology ==
The ancient name of Kirkuk was the Hurrian Arrapha During the Parthian era, a Korkura/Corcura (Ancient Greek: Κόρκυρα) is mentioned by Ptolemy, which is believed to refer either to Kirkuk or to the site of Baba Gurgur 4.5 kilometres (2.8 mi) from the city. Since the Seleucid Empire it was known as karkā d-ḇeṯ slōḵ (Syriac: ܟܪܟܐ ܕܒܝܬ ܣܠܘܟ), which means 'Citadel of the House of Seleucid' in Mesopotamian Aramaic, the lingua franca of the Fertile Crescent in that era.

The region around Kirkuk was known historically in the Eastern Aramaic and Syriac Assyrian sources as Beth Garmai (Syriac: ܒܝܬܓܪܡܝ). The name "Beth Garmai" or "Beth Garme" may be of Syriac origin which meaning "the house of bones", which is thought to be a reference to bones of slaughtered Achaemenids after a decisive Macedonian victory in the Battle of Gaugamela. An alternative explanation for the name's origin suggests that it may have been derived from a people, possibly an Assyrian or Persian tribe.

It was one of a number of independent Neo-Assyrian states which flourished during the Parthian empire (150 BC–226 AD).

It is also thought that region was known during the Parthian and Sassanid periods as Garmakan, which means the 'Land of Warmth' or the 'Hot Land'. In Persian "Garm" means warm;

After the 7th century, Muslim writers used the name Kirkheni (Syriac for "citadel") to refer to the city. Others used other variant, such as Bajermi (a corruption of Aramaic "B'th Garmayeh" or Jermakan (a corruption of Persian Garmakan) .

== History ==
=== Ancient history ===
It is suggested that Kirkuk was one of the places occupied by Neanderthals based on archeological findings in the Shanidar Cave settlement. A large amount of pottery shards dating to the Ubaid period were also excavated from several Tells in the city.

=== Early Bronze ===
==== Akkadian Period ====
Ancient Arrapḫa was a part of Sargon of Akkad's Akkadian Empire (2335–2154 BC), and city was exposed to the raids of the Lullubi during Naram-Sin's reign.

==== Gutian Period ====
Later the city was occupied around 2150 BC by language Isolate speaking Zagros Mountains dwellers who were known as the Gutian people by the Semitic and Sumerian of Mesopotamians. Arrapḫa was the capital of the short-lived Guti kingdom (Gutium).

==== Ur III Period ====
The Gutians were driven from Mesopotamia by the Neo-Sumerian Empire c. 2115 BC.

=== Middle Bronze ===
Arrapḫa became a part of the Old Assyrian Empire (c.2025–1750 BC), before Hammurabi briefly subjected Assyria to the short-lived Babylonian Empire, after which it again became a part of Assyria c.1725 BC.

=== Late Bronze ===
==== Mitanni Period ====
However, by the middle of the 2nd millennium B.C. the Indo-Aryan Mittani of Anatolia formed a ruling class over the language isolate speaking Hurrians, and began to expand into a Hurri-Mitanni Empire. In the 1450s they attacked Assyria, sacking Assur, and bringing the cities of Gasur and Arrapḫa under their control. From c.1450 to 1393 BC the kings of Assyria paid tribute to the kingdom of Mittani.

==== Assyrian Period ====
The Middle Assyrian Empire (1365–1020 BC) overthrew the Hurri-Mitanni in the mid 14th century BC. Arrapha became part of Assyria proper, with the Hurrian population driven away from the region. In the 11th and 10th centuries BC the city rose to prominence, becoming an important city in Assyria until the fall of the Neo-Assyrian Empire (911–605 BC).

=== Iron Age ===
It remained as such throughout the Neo-Assyrian Empire (911–605 BC) where it became an important Assyrian city.

After the fall of Assyria between 612 and 599 BC it was still an integral part of the geo-political province of Assyria – Achaemenid Assyria, Athura, Seleucid Syria, Assyria (Roman province) and Assuristan. In the Parthian and Sassanid eras Kirkuk was capital of the small Assyrian state of Beth Garmai (c.160 BC–250 AD).

The city briefly came to be part of the short-lived Median Empire before falling to the Achaemenid Empire (546–332 BC) where it was incorporated into the province of Athura (Achaemenid Assyria).

Later it became part of the Macedonian Empire (332–312 BC) and succeeding Seleucid Empire (311–150 BC) before falling to the Parthian Empire (150 BC–224 AD) as a part of Athura. The Parthians seemed to only exercise loose control, and a number of small Neo-Assyrian kingdoms sprang up in the region between the 2nd century BC and 4th century AD, one such kingdom named "ܒܝܬܓܪܡܝ", (that is Bit Garmai in Syriac) had Arrapha as its capital. Christianity also arose during this period, with Arrapha and its surrounds being influenced by the Assyrian Church of the East. The Sassanid Empire destroyed these kingdoms during 3rd and early 4th centuries AD, and Arrapha was incorporated into Sassanid ruled Assuristan (Sassanid Assyria).

In AD 341, the Zoroastrian Shapur II ordered the massacre of all Assyrian Christians in the Persian Sassanid Empire. During the persecution, about 1,150 were martyred in Arrapha.

=== Islamic Conquests of Mesopotamia ===
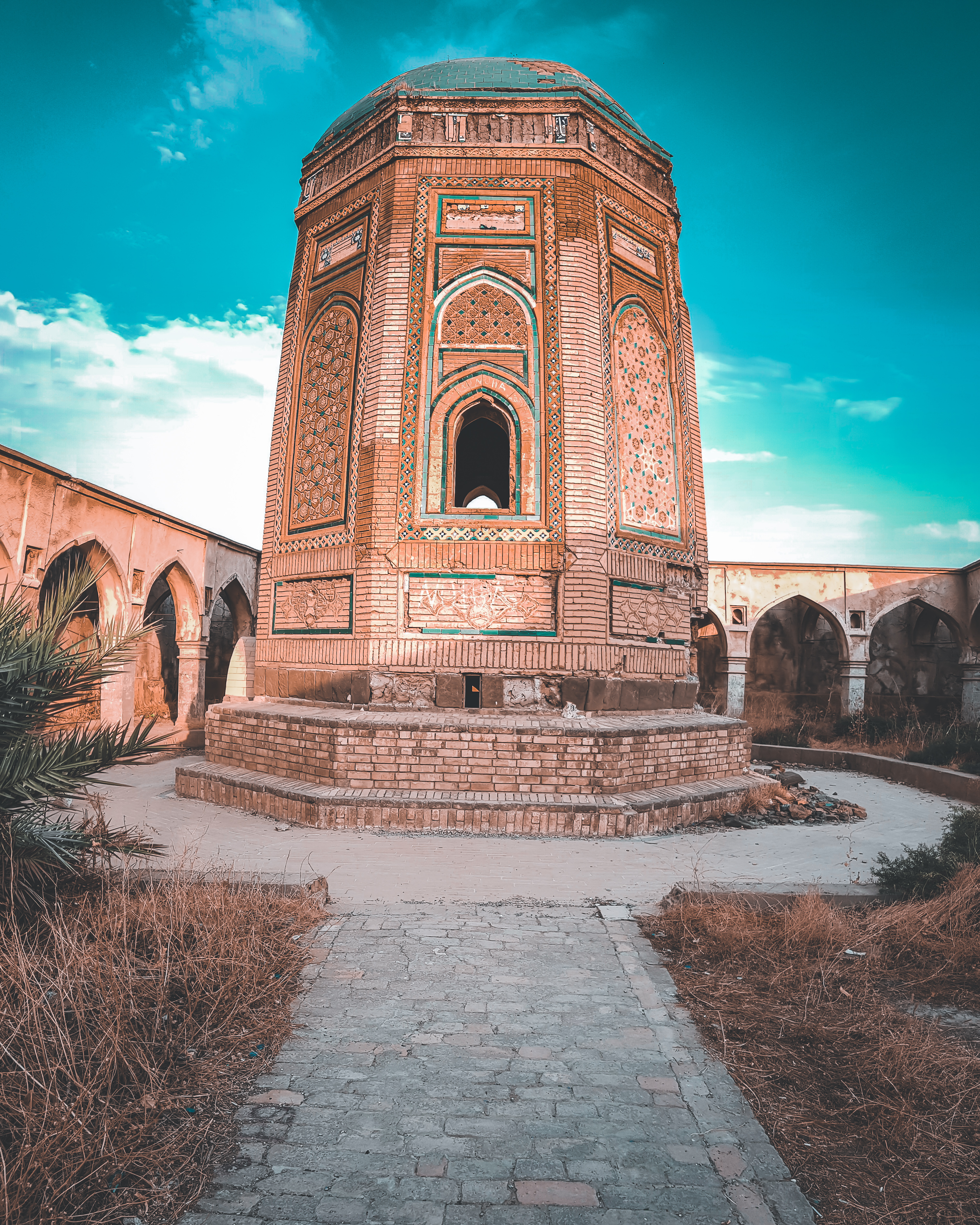
The blue dome at Kirkuk Citadel

Arab Muslims fought the Sassanid empire in the 7th century AD, conquering the region. The city was a part of the Islamic Caliphate until the tenth century. Kirkuk and the surrounding areas were then ruled by the Hasanwayhid Kurds & Annazid Kurds from 1014 to 1120 AD, then it was taken over by Seljuk Turks for many years. After the divided empire collapsed, the city came under the Abbasids rule once again Suleiman Shah who was the governor of the city until it was taken over by Mongols in 1258. After the Mongol invasion, the Ilkhanate was founded in the region and the city became a part of it. The Ilkhanid rule ended when in 1336, the Ardalan took over the city, despite being vassals themselves of the various in Persia centred succeeding Turkic federations in the region, namely that of the Qara Qoyunlu, and the Aq Qoyunlu specifically. After the Battle of Chaldiran in 1514 the city came under the Soran Emirate control until it was taken over by Babanids in 1694. In 1851 it became under direct control of the Ottoman Empire. Ottoman rule continued until World War I when the Ottomans were pushed out of the region by the British Empire.

=== British occupation ===
At the end of World War I, the British occupied Kirkuk on 7 May 1918. Abandoning the city after about two weeks, the British returned to Kirkuk a few months later after the Armistice of Mudros. Kirkuk avoided the troubles caused by the Kurdish nationalist Mahmud Barzanji, who quickly attempted to overthrow the British Mandate in Iraq and establish his own fiefdom in Sulaymaniyah.

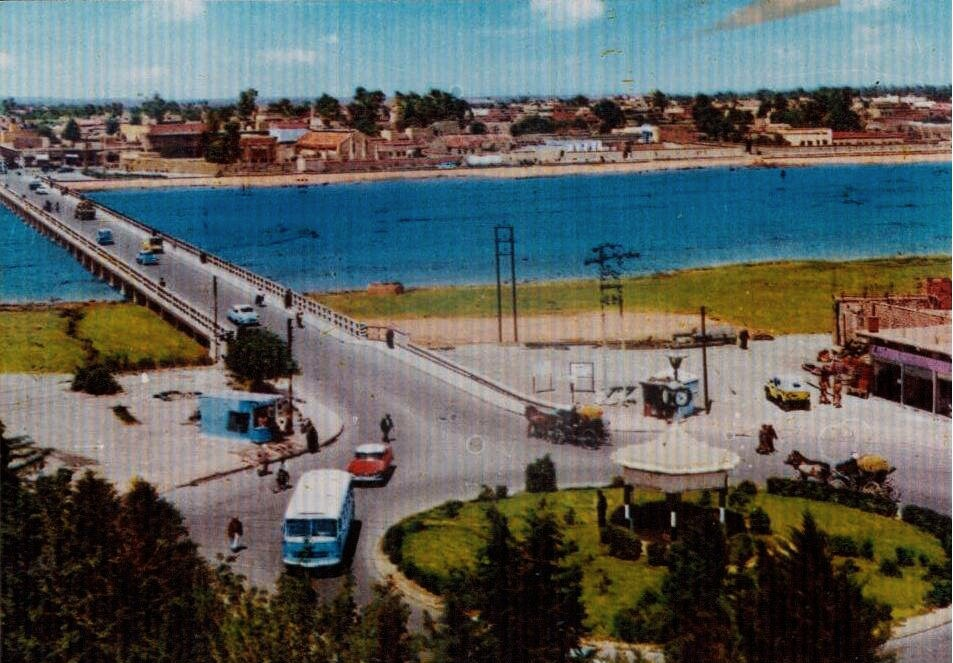
Kirkuk city in the 70s

=== Entry into the Kingdom of Iraq ===
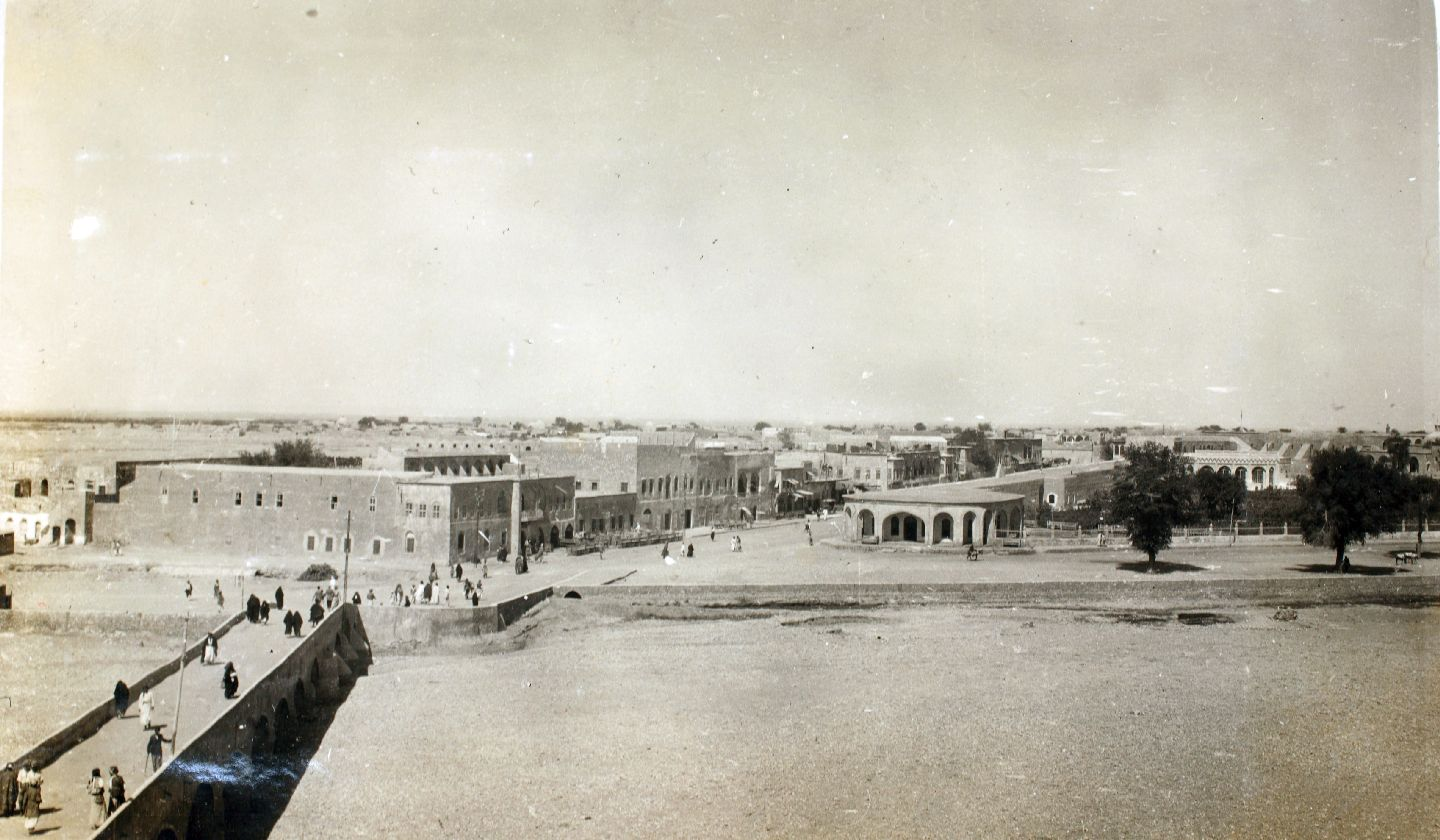
an old picture of Kirkuk

As both Turkey and Great Britain desperately wanted control of the Vilayet of Mosul (of which Kirkuk was a part), the Treaty of Lausanne in 1923 failed to solve the issue. For this reason, the question of Mosul was sent to the League of Nations. A committee travelled to the area before coming to a final decision: the territory south of the "Brussels line" belonged to Iraq. By the Treaty of Angora of 1926, Kirkuk became a part of the Kingdom of Iraq.

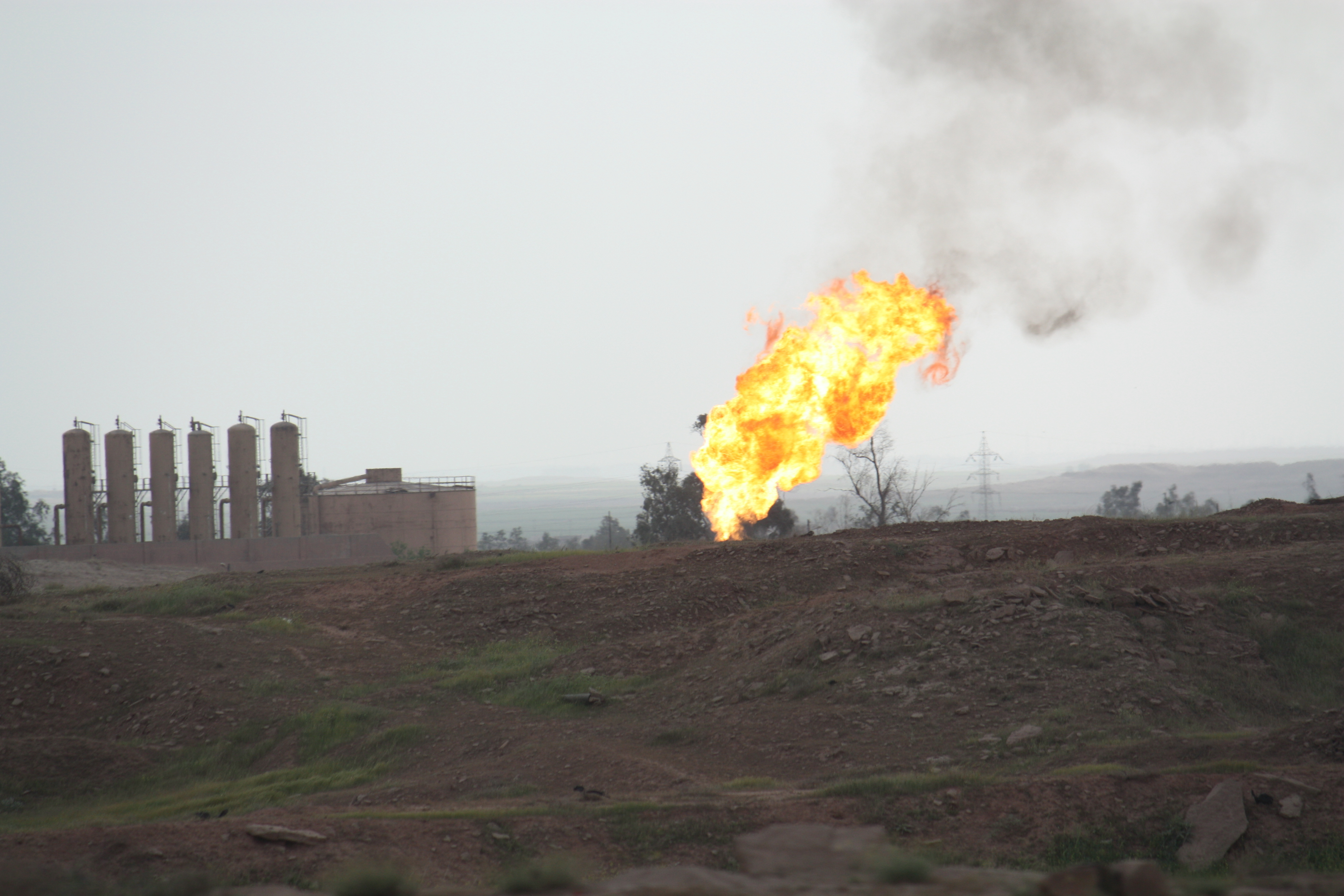
Baba Gurgur

=== Kurdish autonomy and Arabization ===
In 1970 the Iraqi government reached an agreement with Kurdish leader Mustafa Barzani called the March Agreement of 1970, but the question of whether the oil-rich province of Kirkuk would be included within the Kurdish autonomous region remained unresolved, pending a new census.

Despite the signing of the March Agreement, relations between the Kurds and Iraqi government continued to deteriorate due to the unresolved status of Kirkuk, and there were two attempts to assassinate Barzani in 1972. In response to Barzani's continued demands during the early 1970s for Kirkuk to be recognized as part of the autonomous region under the terms of the March Agreement, settlement construction for newly arrived Arab families increased drastically as the Ba'athist government implemented Arabization policies to increase the Arab population of Kirkuk. Kurds were forbidden from buying property in Kirkuk, and could sell their properties only to Arabs. They were denied permission to renovate properties in need of maintenance, and poor Shi'a Arab families were paid to move to Kirkuk, while Kurds were paid to move out.

Negotiations between Barzani's Kurdish Democratic Party and the Iraqi government collapsed in March 1974 and Barzani rejected President Ahmed Hassan al-Bakr declaration of Kurdish autonomy. Many disputes persisted between the Kurds and Arabs and the conflict escalated into the Second Iraqi–Kurdish War (also called the Barzani rebellion). The rebellion collapsed after Iran withdrew its support for Barzani's forces following the 1975 Algiers Agreement and the Ba'ath regime intensified Arabization efforts.

After Barzani's rebellion was defeated in 1974, the districts of Chemchemal and Kelar, which had been part of Kirkuk, became part of Sulaymaniyah and Kifri became part of Diyala province. Other Arab-populated districts, like Zab, became part of Kirkuk. Kurds, Turkmen and Christian populations were forcibly relocated and replaced with Shi'a from Iraq's south. The expulsions continued after the 1991 uprisings. Kurdish villages were razed and thousands of new homes were built, including at least 200 homes for relatives of Iraqi soldiers killed during the Iran-Iraq War. Between 1968, when the Ba'ath Party first rose to power in Iraq, and 2003 between 200,000 and 300,000 persons were forcibly relocated out of Kirkuk. According to the Iraqi Ministry of Planning, by August 2005 (during the Iraq War), approximately 224,544 Kurds had returned to Kirkuk and 52,973 Arab persons had left the city.

=== Gulf War ===
In 1991, Saddam Hussein invaded Kuwait and was quickly routed by the United States in the First Gulf War (also called Operation Desert Storm). In the aftermath of the Iraqi army's defeat, rebellions broke out in Iraq; first in southern Iraq on March 1, and in the northern Kurdish region a few days later. By March 24, Kurdish Peshmerga forces had seized control of Kirkuk, but they were only able to hold it until March 28 when it was reclaimed by Hussein's forces. The US and UK began to enforce a no-fly zone in Northern Iraq and a de facto Kurdish Autonomous region emerged in the North. Arabs families were expelled from the Kurdish region and relocated to Kirkuk, which was still controlled by the Iraqi government. In these circumstances, Hussein's government further intensified the decades long policy of Arabization in Kirkuk, requiring that Kurds, Turkmen and Assyrians fill out "ethnic identity correction" forms and register as Arabs and many who refused to comply were forcibly relocated north of the Green Line. In May 1991, Massoud Barzani announced that Baghdad had conceded Kirkuk as the capital of the autonomous region, but when the Iraqi government demanded the Kurds join the Ba'athist government the dispute once again escalated to violent conflict and in October 1991 Iraqi forces had withdrawn from several Kurdish provinces in the North including Erbil, Dohuk and Sulaymaniyah.

=== Iraq War (2003–2011) and return of displaced Kurds ===
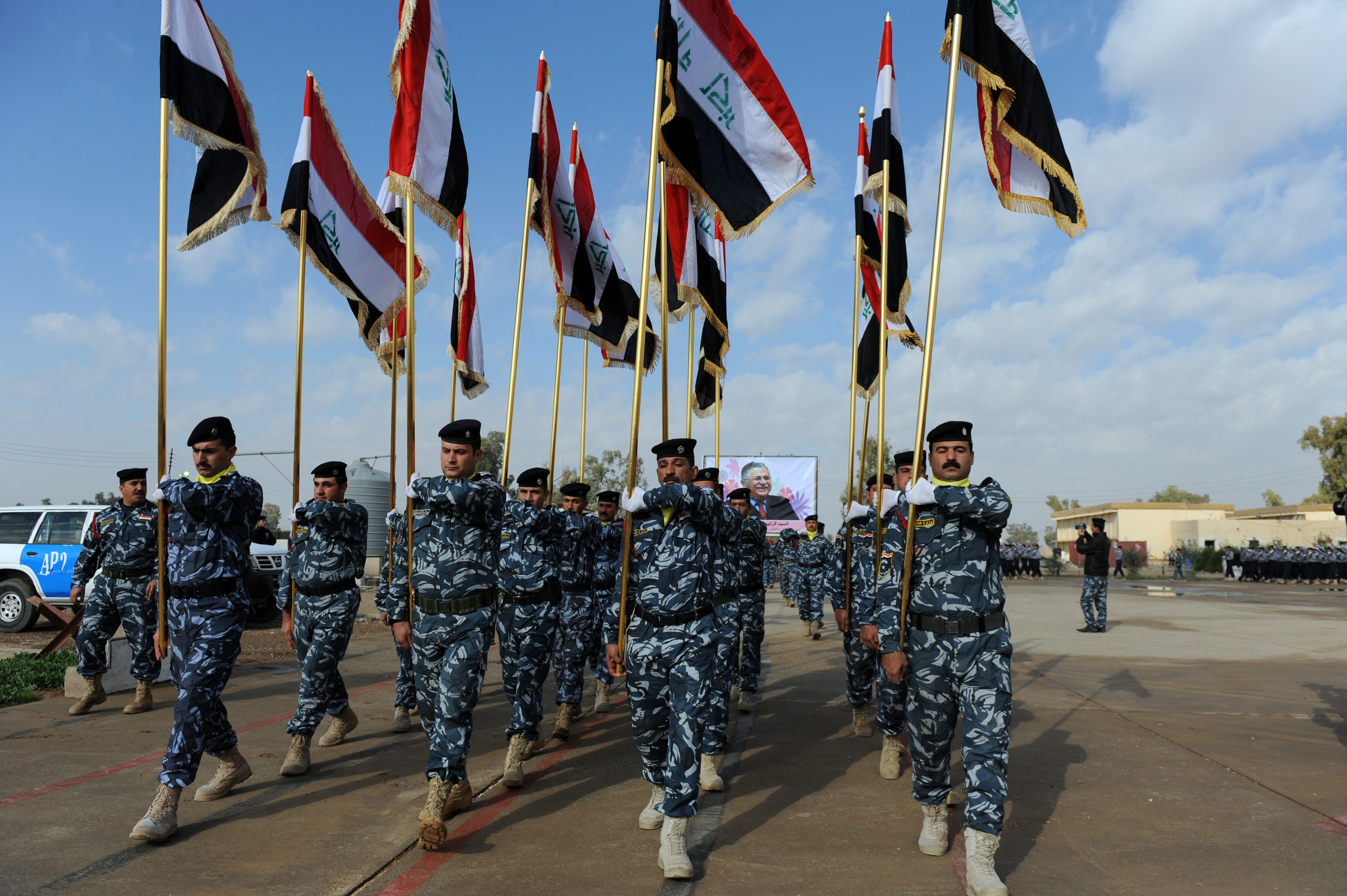
Iraqi Personnel Graduate From Kirkuk

American and British military forces led an invasion of Iraq in March 2003, marking the start of the Second Iraq War. Kurdish peshmerga fighters assisted in the 2003 capture of Kirkuk. Though the peshmerga were allowed to operate even after the Coalition Provisional Authority (CPA) disbanded and outlawed most of the armed militias in Iraq, the peshmerga were eventually asked to withdraw from Kirkuk and other Kurdish held provinces.

Under the supervision of chief executive of Coalition Provisional Authority L. Paul Bremer, a convention was held on 24 May 2003 to select the first City Council in the history of this oil-rich, ethnically divided city. Each of the city's four major ethnic groups was invited to send a 39-member delegation from which they would be allowed to select six to sit on the City Council. Another six council members were selected from among 144 delegates to represent independents social groups such as teachers, lawyers, religious leaders and artists.

Kirkuk's 30 members council is made up of five blocs of six members each. Four of those blocs are formed along ethnic lines—Kurds, Arabs, Assyrian and Turkmen—and the fifth is made up of independents which meant 10 more council seats given to two main Kurdish Parties by Paul Bremer as token of appreciation for cooperation with American Forces. Turkmen and Arabs complained that the Kurds allegedly hold five of the seats in the independent block. They were also infuriated that their only representative at the council's helm was an assistant mayor whom they considered pro-Kurdish. Abdul Rahman Mustafa (Arabic: عبدالرحمن مصطفى), a Baghdad-educated lawyer was elected mayor by 20 votes to 10. The appointment of an Arab, Ismail Ahmed Rajab Al Hadidi (Arabic: اسماعيل احمد رجب الحديدي), as deputy mayor went some way towards addressing Arab concerns.

On 30 June 2005, through a secret direct voting process, with the participation of the widest communities in the province and despite all the political legal security complexities of this process in the country generally and in Kirkuk in particular, Kirkuk witnessed the birth of its first elected Provincial Council. The Independent Electoral Commission of Iraq IECI approved the elections and announced the outcome of this process, which filled the 41 seats of Kirkuk Provincial Council as follows:

- 26 seats 367 List Kirkuk Brotherhood List KBL
- 8 seats 175 List Iraqi Turkmen Front ITF
- 5 seats 299 List Iraqi Republic Gathering
- 1 seats 178 List Turkmen Islamic Coalition
- 1 seats 289 List Iraqi National Gathering

The new Kirkuk Provincial Council started its second turn on 6 March 2005. Its inaugural session was dedicated to the introduction of its new members, followed by an oath ceremony supervised by Judge Thahir Hamza Salman, the Head of Kirkuk Appellate Court.

Kirkuk is located in a disputed area of Iraq that runs from Sinjar on the Syrian border southeast to Khanaqin and Mandali on the Iranian border. Kirkuk has been a disputed territory for around eighty years — Kurds wanted Kirkuk to become part of the Kurdistan Region, which has been opposed by the region's Arab and Turkmen populations.

The Kurds sought to annex the long disputed territory to the Kurdistan Regional Government (KRG) through Article 140 of the Iraqi Constitution that was enacted in 2005. Under Article 140 the Ba'athist Arabization policy would be reversed: Displaced Kurds who had relocated to areas in the Kurdish autonomous region would return to Kirkuk, while the Arab Shi'a population would be compensated and relocated to areas in the south. After the Ba'athist regimes demographic and redistricting policies were undone a census and referendum would determine whether Kirkuk would be administered by the KRG or Baghdad.

Following the 2010 parliamentary election the Kurds signed the Erbil Agreement and backed Nouri al-Maliki on the condition that Article 140 would be implemented.

=== Violence after U.S. withdrawal ===
Three churches in Kirkuk were targeted with bombs in August 2011. On 12 July 2013, Kirkuk was hit by a deadly bomb, killing 38 people in an attack on a café. A few days prior, on 11 July 2013, over 40 people were killed in a series of bombings and shootings across Iraq, including in Kirkuk.

=== Kurdish control (2014–2017) ===
On 12 June 2014, following the 2014 Northern Iraq offensive of the Islamic State, during which it secured control of Tikrit and nearby areas in Syria, the Iraqi army retreated from their positions in Kirkuk and the Peshmerga of the Kurdistan Regional Government then took the city.

On 21 October 2016, the Islamic State launched multiple attacks in Kirkuk to divert Iraqi military resources during the Battle of Mosul. Witnesses reported multiple explosions and gun battles in the city, most centered on a government compound. At least 11 workers, including several Iranians, were killed by a suicide bomber at a power plant in nearby Dibis. The attack was brought to an end by 24 October, with 74 militants being killed and others (including the leader) being arrested.

==== Kurdification ====
Under Kurdish control, Turkmen and Arab residents in Kirkuk experienced intimidation, harassment and were forced to leave their homes, in order to increase the Kurdish demographic in Kirkuk and bolster their claims to the city. Multiple Human Rights Watch reports detail the confiscation of Turkmen and Arab families' documents, preventing them from voting, buying property and travelling. Turkmen residents of Kirkuk were detained by Kurdish forces and compelled to leave the city. Kurdish authorities expelled hundreds of Arab families from the city, demolishing their homes in the process.

United Nations reports since 2006 have documented that Kurdish authorities and Peshmerga militia forces were illegally policing Kirkuk and other disputed areas, and that these militia have abducted Turkmen and Arabs, subjecting them to torture.

=== Iraqi central government control (2017–present) ===
On 16 October 2017, the Iraqi national army and PMF militia retook control of Kirkuk as the Peshmerga forces fled the city without fighting.

Kirkuk has been a disputed territory for around eighty years. The KRG wanted Kirkuk to become part of the Kurdistan Region, which is opposed by the region's Arab and Turkmen populations.

There has been a long planned referendum to resolve Kirkuk's status under Article 140 of the Iraqi Constitution.

In 2023, Anti-Kurdish unrest started in Kirkuk after the building used by the Joint Operation Command in Iraq was transferred to the KDP.

== Demographics ==
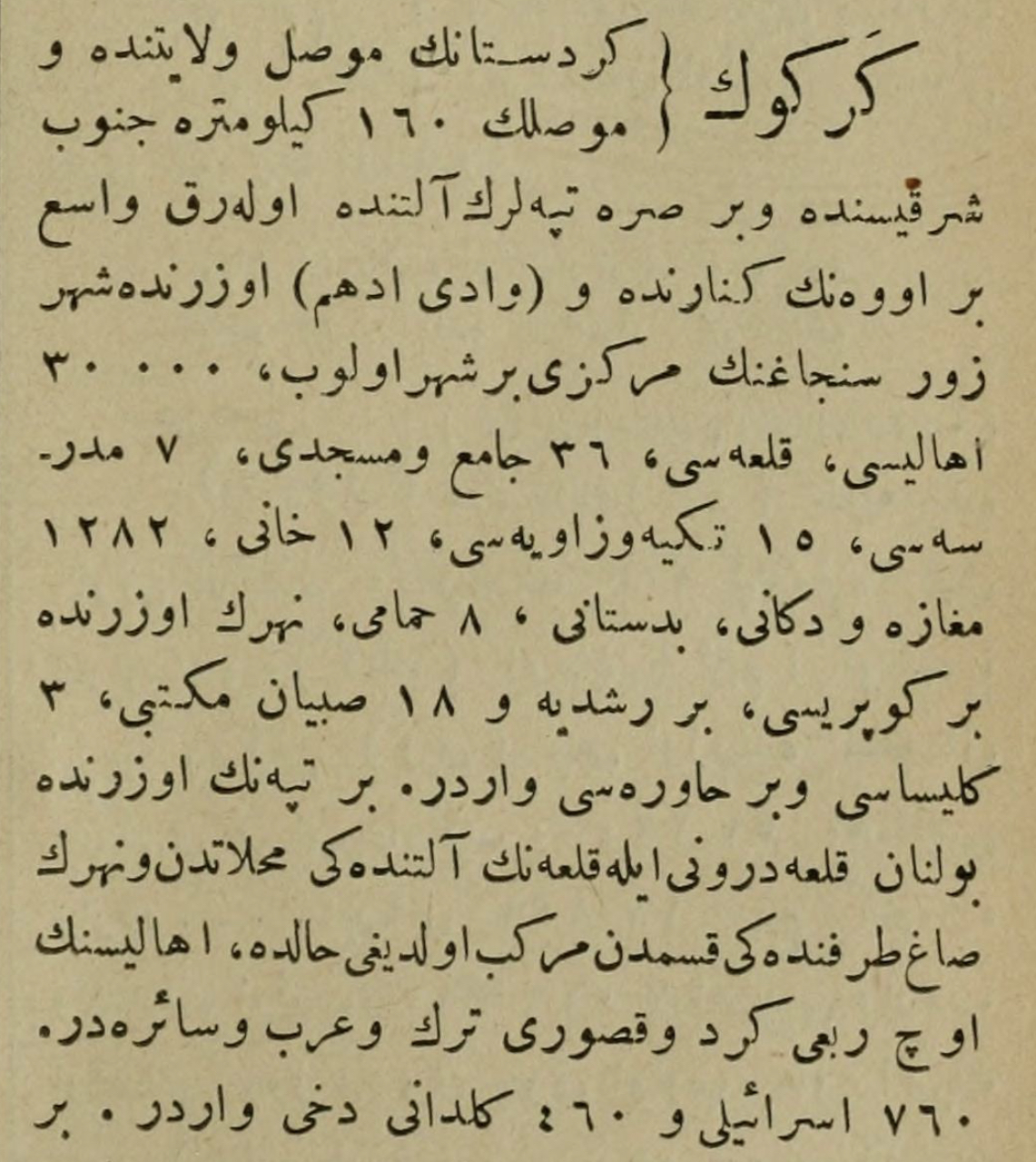
Kirkuk in Kâmûsü'l-A'lâm.

Şemseddin Sâmi mentioned Kirkuk city in the Kâmûsü'l-A'lâm written in the late 19th century. And says "Kirkuk is located to the southeast of the Mosul vilayet in Kurdistan, with a population of 30,000." then he says "The Kurds make up three-quarters of the people of Kirkuk, and the rest are Turks, Arabs, 760 Jews and 460 Chaldeans."

Kirkuk's population was predominantly Turkmen in the early 20th century, when Turkish was the most common language spoken at home. The city had a population near 30,000 in the late 1910s. The Turkmen were majority in the city centre, dominating the political and economic life of the area.

The most reliable census concerning the ethnic composition of Kirkuk dates back to 1957. The Turkish-speaking Turkmen formed the plurality in the city of Kirkuk, whilst the Kurds were the plurality in the governorate. The provincial borders were later altered, the province was renamed al-Ta'mim, and some Kurdish-majority districts were added to Erbil and Sulamaniya provinces.

Census results for the city proper of Kirkuk in 1957
Mother tongue	Population	Percentage
Turkish (Turkmen)	45,306	37.6%
Kurdish	40,047	33.3%
Arabic	27,127	22.5%
Syriac	1,509	1.3%
Hebrew	101	0.1%
Total	120,402	

A report by the International Crisis Group points out that figures from the 1977 and 1997 censuses "are all considered highly problematic, due to suspicions of regime manipulation" because Iraqi citizens were only allowed to indicate belonging to either the Arab or Kurdish ethnic groups; consequently, this skewed the number of other ethnic minorities. Many Iraqi Turkmen declared themselves as Arabs (because the Kurds were not desirable under Saddam Hussein's regime), reflecting the changes wrought by Arabisation.

=== Ethnic groups ===
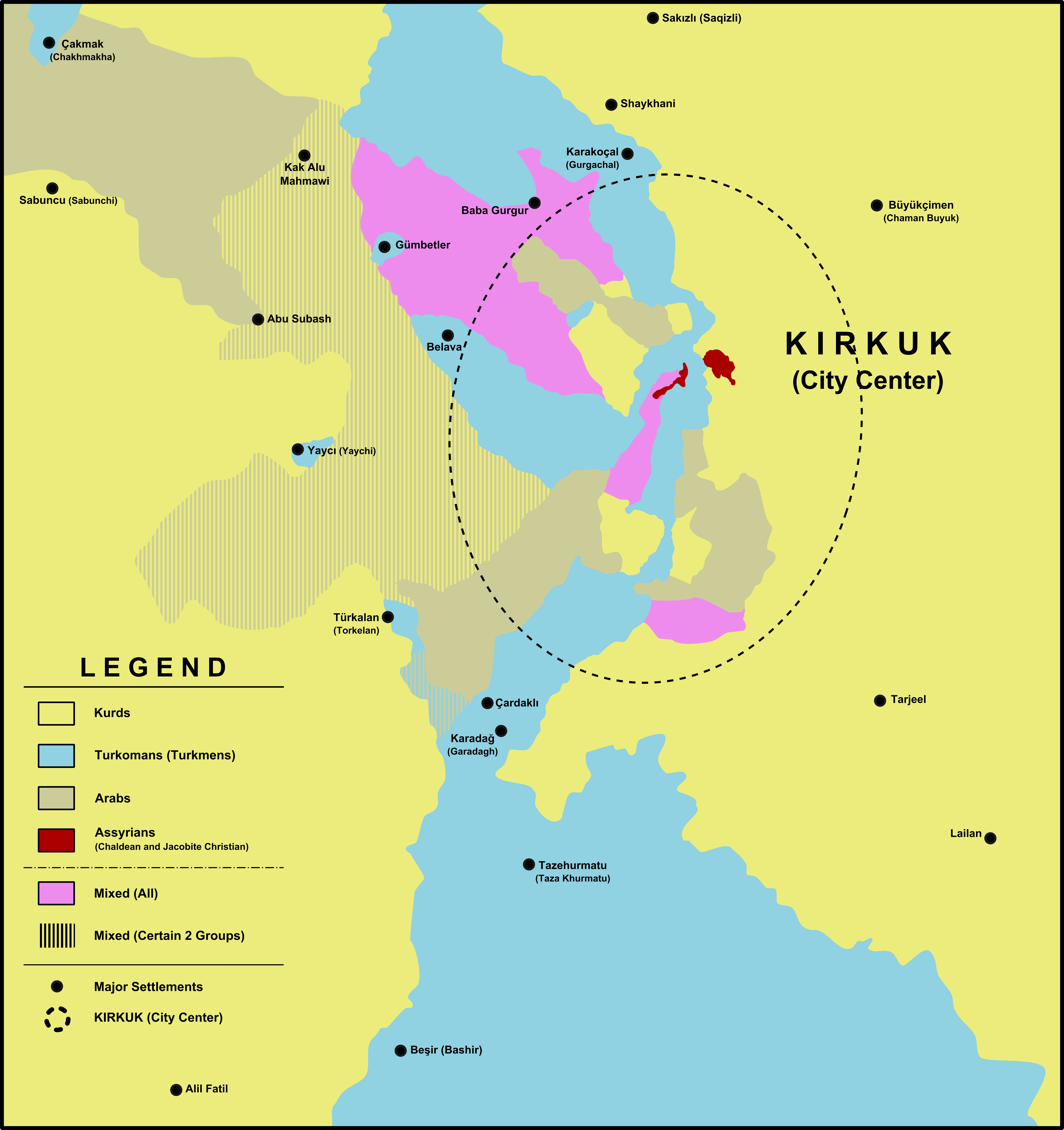
Ethnic groups in Kirkuk and its environs in 2014, at the time of the capture of the area by Kurdish forces.

After attacks by ISIS, Kurdish authorities who were suspicious of the Arab refugees in Kirkuk, expelled hundreds of Arab families who had fled to the region during Iraq's war against ISIS. The refugees were sent to camps for the displaced or to their places of origin. Some of the displaced described themselves as locals and not as internally displaced.

==== Arabs ====
The principal Arab extended families in the city of Kirkuk were: the Tikriti and the Hadidi (Arabic: حديدي). The Tikriti family was the main Arab family in Kirkuk coming from Tikrit in the 17th century. Other Arab tribes who settled in Kirkuk during the Ottoman Period are the Al-Ubaid (Arabic: آل عبيد) and the Al-Jiburi (Arabic: آل جبور). The Al-Ubaid came from just northwest of Mosul when they were forced out of the area by other Arab tribes of that region. They settled in the Hawija district in Kirkuk in 1805 during the Ottoman Period.

==== Armenians ====
In 2017, around 30 Armenian families resided in the city. The community has also an Armenian Apostolic church.

==== Assyrians ====
The Seleucid town, like many other Upper Mesopotamian cities had a significant indigenous Assyrian population. Christianity was established among them in the 2nd century by the bishop Tuqrītā (Theocritos). During the Sasanian times the town became an important centre of the Assyrian Church of the East, with several of its bishops rising to the rank of Patriarch. Tensions among Christians and Zoroastrians led to a severe persecution of Christians during the reign of Shapur II (309–379 A.D.) as recorded in the Acts of the Persian Martyrs. Persecution resumed under Yazdegerd II in 445 A.D. who massacred thousands of them. Their situation greatly improved under the Sasanians in the following two centuries after the advent of a national Persian church of free of Byzantine influence, namely Nestorianism. Persecution resumed under Yazdegerd II in 445 A.D. who massacred thousands of them. Tradition puts the death toll at 12,000 among them the patriarch Shemon Bar Sabbae. The city was known as the centre of the prosperous Ecclesiastical Province of Beth Garmai which lingered until the conquests of Timur Leng in 1400 A.D. During the Ottoman period most of Kirkuk's Christians followed the Chaldean Catholic Church whose bishop resided in the Cathedral of the Great Martyrion which dates back to the 5th century. The cathedral was however used as a powder storage and was blown up as the Ottomans retreated in 1918.

The discovery of oil brought more Christians to Kirkuk, however they were also affected by the Arabization policy of the Baath Party. Their numbers continued to plummet after the American invasion, and they occupy 4% of municipal offices, a percentage thought to be representative of their numbers in the city.

They are ethnic Assyrians who speak their own dialect of Turkish and religiously follow the Chaldean Catholic Church from Kirkuk who lived in or near the citadel, where they adopted the Turkish language from Iraqi Turkmen, especially during the Ottoman Empire. Their dialect is mutually intelligible with the Iraqi Turkmen dialect. Their official hymns, eulogies, and prayers are in Turkish. Their bible is in the Ottoman Turkish language written in the 1800s and is recited by community leaders. The Citadel Christians are not to be confused with the community of Iraqi Turkmen who follow the Roman Catholic Church, which numbered around 30,000 in 2015 and live all across Turkmeneli, including Kirkuk, while the Citadel Christians were exclusively in Kirkuk before the migrations.

==== Jews ====
Jews had a long history in Kirkuk. Ottoman records show that in 1560 there were 104 Jewish homes in Kirkuk, and in 1896 there were 760 Jews in the city. After World War I, the Jewish population increased, especially after Kirkuk became a petroleum center; in 1947 there were 2,350 counted in the census. Jews were generally engaged in commerce and handicraft. Social progress was slow, and it was only in the 1940s that some Jewish students acquired secondary academic education. By 1951 almost all of the Jews had left for Israel.

==== Kurds ====
Kirkuk is claimed by the Kurdistan Regional Government as its capital, but they do not control the city or province, and Kirkuk is not part of the Kurdistan Region. The last reliable census shows that the Kurds constituted less than a third of Kirkuk's population.

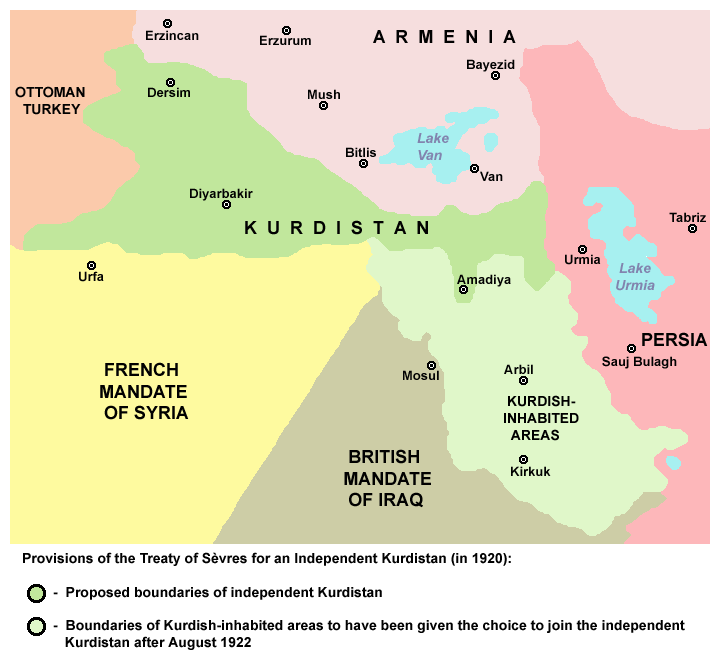
Provisions of the Treaty of Sèvres for an independent Kurdistan (in 1920)

The Baban family was a Kurdish family that, in the 18th and 19th centuries, dominated the political life of the province of Sharazor, in present-day Iraqi Kurdistan. The first member of the clan to gain control of the province and its capital, Kirkuk, was Sulayman Beg. Enjoying almost full autonomy, the Baban family established Kirkuk as their capital. It was from this time that Kurds in Iraq began to view Kirkuk as their capital. This persisted even after the Babans moved their administration to the new town of Sulaymaniya, named after the dynasty's founder, in the late 18th century.

==== Turkmens ====
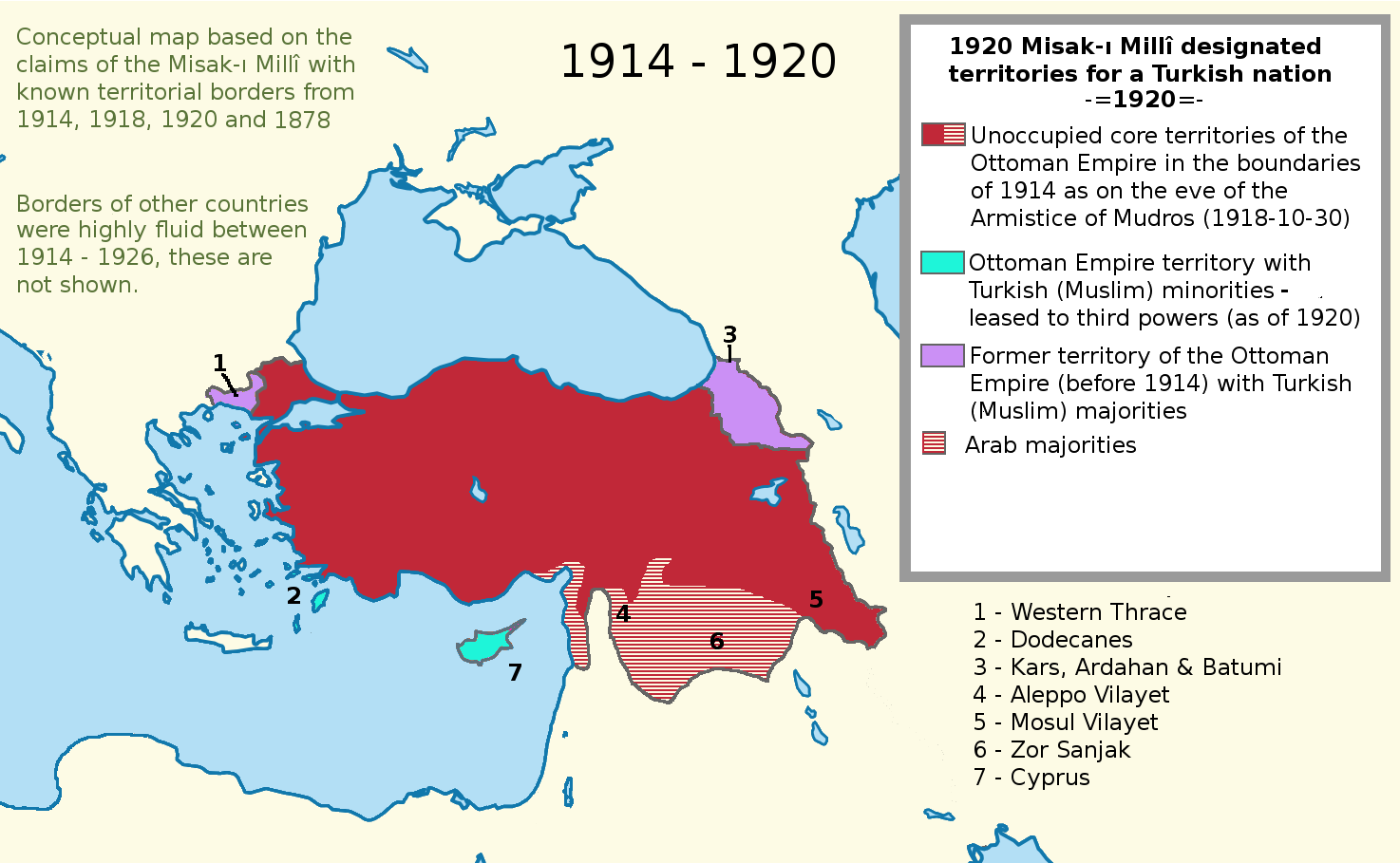
The Republic of Turkey's borders according to the National Pact

Iraqi Turkmens view the city as their capital, with the last reliable census showing the city of Kirkuk had a Turkmen majority.

In the city of Kirkuk, Turkmens reside in the neighborhoods of Tisin, Musalla, Korya, Baghdad Road, Sarıkahya, Şaturlu, Beyler, Piryadi, Almas, Arafa, Bulak, Çukur, İmam Abbas, Cırıt Square, Çay, 1 June and Beşiktaş. They are sparsely dispersed in other neighborhoods. It is also known that Christian Turkmens live in the neighborhoods of Şaturlu, Almas and Arafa in Kirkuk. There are many Turkmen villages around Kirkuk. These villages include Türkalan, Yayçı, Çardaklı, Kızılyar, Kümbetler, Bulova and Beşir.

The riverfront, the historical homes, alleyways, the old cemeteries, and the prevailing musical modes of Kirkuk historically belong to the Turkmen. The old names of most of the villages and districts in Kirkuk, as well as the prevalent trades and occupations, trace back to Turkmen families.

The Turkmen are believed to be descendants of numerous Turkic migration waves. The earliest arrivals date back to the Umayyads and Abbasid eras, when they arrived as military recruits. Considerable Turcoman settlement continued during the Seljuq era when Toghrul entered Iraq in 1055 with his army composed mostly of Oghuz Turks. Kirkuk remained under the control of the Seljuq Empire for 63 years. However, the largest Turkic migration waves occurred during the four centuries of Ottoman rule (1535–1919) when Turkish migrants from Anatolia were encouraged to settle in the region; indeed, it is largely from this period that modern Turkmens claim association with Anatolia and the modern Turkish state.

In particular, following the conquest of Iraq by the Ottoman sultan Suleiman the Magnificent in 1535, Kirkuk came firmly under Ottoman control and was referred to “Gökyurt” (Blue Homeland) in the Ottoman records, "perhaps indicating that Kirkuk was identified as a particularly Turkic town by that time." Under the Ottomans, Turkish migrations from Anatolia to Kirkuk occurred throughout the centuries; firstly during the initial conquest of 1535, followed by the arrival of Turkish families with the army of sultan Murad IV in 1638, whilst others came later with other notable Ottoman figures. These families occupied the highest socioeconomic strata and held the most important bureaucratic jobs until the end of Ottoman rule. During this period, the Turcoman were the predominant population of Kirkuk city and its close environs but Kurds constituted the majority of the rural population of Kirkuk. Kirkuk had a population near 30,000 in the late 1910s, Turkmens were majority in the city center, dominating the political and economic life of the area.

Currently Iraqi Turkmen politicians hold just over 20 percent of seats on Kirkuk's city council, while Turkmen leaders say they make up nearly a third of the city.

== Economy ==
The discovery of vast quantities of oil in the region after World War I provided the impetus for the annexation of the former Ottoman Vilayet of Mosul (of which the Kirkuk region was a part), to the Iraqi Kingdom, established in 1921. Since then and particularly from 1963 onwards, there have been continuous attempts to transform the ethnic make-up of the region. Pipelines from Kirkuk run through Turkey to Ceyhan on the Mediterranean Sea and were one of the two main routes for the export of Iraqi oil under the Oil-for-Food Programme following the Gulf War of 1991. This was in accordance with a United Nations mandate that at least 50% of the oil exports pass through Turkey. There were two parallel lines built in 1977 and 1987.

In 1927, Iraqi and American drillers working for the foreign-owned and British-led Iraq Petroleum Company (IPC) struck a huge oil gusher at Baba Gurgur ("St. Blaze" or father blaze in Kurdish) near Kirkuk. The IPC began exports from the Kirkuk oil field in 1934. The Company moved its headquarters from Tuz Khormatu to a camp on the outskirts of Kirkuk, which they named Arrapha after the ancient city. Arrapha remains a large neighborhood in Kirkuk to this day. The IPC exercised significant political power in the city and played a central role in Kirkuk's urbanization, initiating housing and development projects in collaboration with Iraqi authorities in the 1940s and 1950s.

The presence of the oil industry had an effect on Kirkuk's demographics. The exploitation of Kirkuk's oil, which began around 1930, attracted both Arabs and Kurds to the city in search of work. Kirkuk, which had been a predominantly Iraqi Turkmen city, gradually lost its uniquely Turkmen character. At the same time, large numbers of Kurds from the mountains were settling in the uninhabited but cultivable rural parts of the district of Kirkuk. The influx of Kurds into Kirkuk continued through the 1960s. According to the 1957 census, Kirkuk city was 37.63% Iraqi Turkmen, 33.26% Kurdish with Arabs constituting 22.53% of its population. Assyrians comprised 1.25% of the population.

In 1972 the Iraqi government, led by then Vice-President Saddam Hussein, nationalized the Iraqi Petroleum Company, after being unable to reach an agreement that would increase oil exports and resolve a longstanding dispute over Law 80 of 1961. The Iraqi government began to sell its oil to Eastern bloc countries and the IPC's French partner CFP. After reaching an agreement with the Iraqis in 1973, the IPC members were able to retain some of their interests in southern Iraq through the Basra Petroleum Company but had lost Iraq's main oilfields, including the Kirkuk field. Some analysts believe that poor reservoir-management practices during the time of Saddam may have seriously, and even permanently, damaged Kirkuk's oil field. One example showed an estimated 1,500,000,000 barrels (240,000,000 m^{3}) of excess fuel oil being re injected. Other problems include refinery residue and gas-stripped oil. Fuel oil reinjection has increased oil viscosity at Kirkuk making it more difficult and expensive to get the oil out of the ground.

Over all, between April 2003 and late December 2004 there were an estimated 123 attacks on energy infrastructures, including the country's 7,000 km-long pipeline system. In response to these attacks, which cost Iraq billions of U.S dollars in lost oil-export revenues and repair costs, the United States military set up the Task Force Shield to guard Iraq's energy infrastructure and the Kirkuk–Ceyhan Oil Pipeline in particular. In spite of the fact that little damage was done to Iraq's oil fields during the war itself, looting and sabotage after the war ended was highly destructive and accounted for perhaps eighty percent of the total damage.

== Main sites ==
Ancient architectural monuments of Kirkuk include:

- the Prophet Daniel's Tomb
- the Kirkuk Citadel
- Qaysareyah of Kirkuk
- the Qishla of Kirkuk

The archaeological sites of Qal'at Jarmo and Yorgan Tepe are found at the outskirts of the modern city. In 1997, there were reports that the government of Saddam Hussein "demolished Kirkuk's historic citadel with its mosques and ancient church".

The architectural heritage of Kirkuk sustained serious damage during World War I (when some pre-Muslim Assyrian Christian monuments were destroyed) and, more recently, during the Iraq War. Simon Jenkins reported in June 2007 that "eighteen ancient shrines have been lost, ten in Kirkuk and the south in the past month alone".

== Geography ==
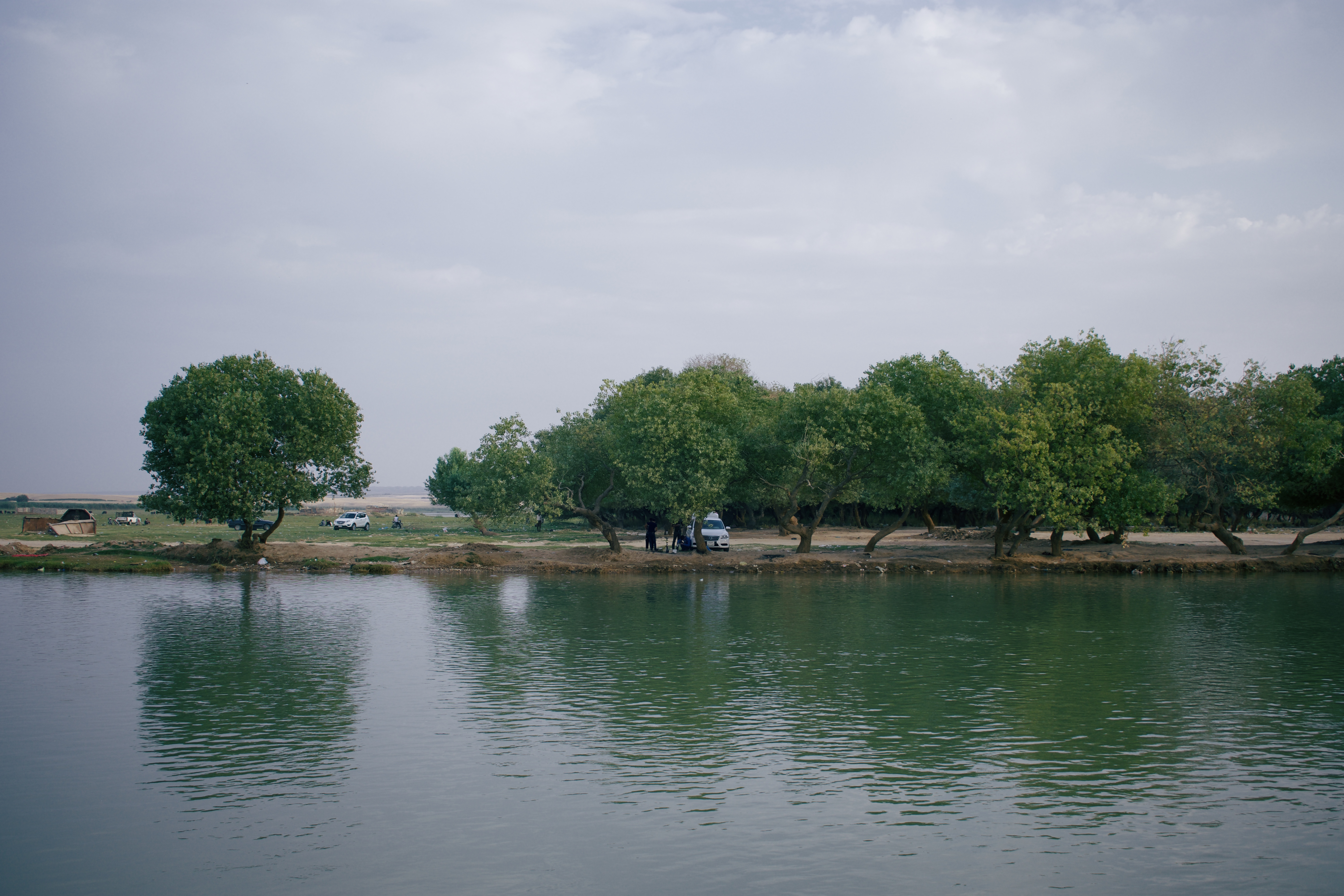
Alton Kopri, between Kirkuk and Erbil

Kirkuk is located 238 kilometres (148 miles) north of Baghdad.

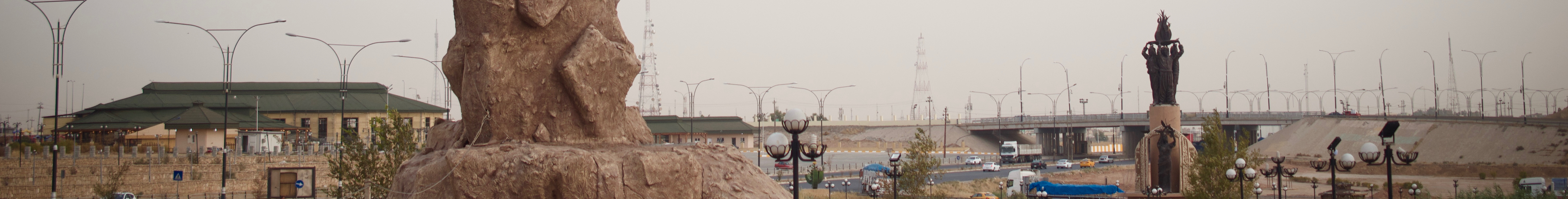
Statue of a Peshmerga with the Kurdistan flag at the entrance to Kirkuk on the road with Erbil

=== Climate ===
Kirkuk experiences a hot semi-arid climate (Köppen climate classification: BSh) with extremely hot and dry summers and mild winters with moderate rainfall. Snow is rare but it fell on 22 February 2004, and from 10 to 11 January 2008.

Climate data for Kirkuk (1991–2020, extremes since 1938)
Month	Jan	Feb	Mar	Apr	May	Jun	Jul	Aug	Sep	Oct	Nov	Dec	Year
Record high °C (°F)	27.5 (81.5)	26.7 (80.1)	34.4 (93.9)	40.3 (104.5)	44.5 (112.1)	48.1 (118.6)	50.9 (123.6)	50.6 (123.1)	47.0 (116.6)	42.0 (107.6)	33.4 (92.1)	30.9 (87.6)	50.9 (123.6)
Mean daily maximum °C (°F)	14.4 (57.9)	16.4 (61.5)	21.0 (69.8)	27.0 (80.6)	34.4 (93.9)	40.7 (105.3)	43.8 (110.8)	43.6 (110.5)	38.6 (101.5)	31.6 (88.9)	22.9 (73.2)	16.6 (61.9)	29.3 (84.6)
Daily mean °C (°F)	9.6 (49.3)	11.3 (52.3)	15.6 (60.1)	21.2 (70.2)	28.2 (82.8)	34.1 (93.4)	36.9 (98.4)	36.5 (97.7)	31.6 (88.9)	25.4 (77.7)	16.7 (62.1)	11.5 (52.7)	23.2 (73.8)
Mean daily minimum °C (°F)	5.2 (41.4)	6.4 (43.5)	10.7 (51.3)	14.9 (58.8)	21.1 (70.0)	26.4 (79.5)	29.3 (84.7)	28.9 (84.0)	24.6 (76.3)	19.5 (67.1)	11.5 (52.7)	6.7 (44.1)	17.1 (62.8)
Record low °C (°F)	−6.7 (19.9)	−6.7 (19.9)	−5.6 (21.9)	1.0 (33.8)	6.7 (44.1)	13.0 (55.4)	20.0 (68.0)	19.4 (66.9)	9.4 (48.9)	1.1 (34.0)	−2.0 (28.4)	−6.1 (21.0)	−6.7 (19.9)
Average precipitation mm (inches)	66.6 (2.62)	54.7 (2.15)	50.7 (2.00)	37.8 (1.49)	14.0 (0.55)	0.1 (0.00)	0.3 (0.01)	0.0 (0.0)	0.7 (0.03)	14.9 (0.59)	43.1 (1.70)	54.9 (2.16)	337.8 (13.3)
Average precipitation days	11	11	11	9	5	0	0	0	0	5	7	10	69
Average relative humidity (%)	72.4	67.1	58.0	51.2	35.7	25.3	23.6	25.3	29.3	40.5	59.0	69.4	46.4
Source 1: WMO (precipitation days 1976–2008), DWD(extremes for 1938-1976)
Source 2: Meteomanz(record high since 2009)

== Notable people ==
- Ibtisam Abdallah (Arab novelist)
- Seyyid Abdullah Pasha (Ottoman grand vizier)
- Najiba Ahmad (Kurdish writer and poet)
- Fadhil Al Azzawi (Arab writer and poet)
- Herdi Noor Al-Deen (Kurdish soccer player)
- Saadeddin Arkej (Turkmen, Honorary Leader of Iraqi Turkmen Front)
- Selim Bayraktar (Turkmen actor)
- Hijri Dede (Turkmen poet)
- Chopy Fatah (Kurdish singer)
- Ismail Ahmed Rajab Al Hadidi (Arab politician)
- Mohsen Abdel Hamid (Kurdish politician)
- Muhammad Sadiq Hassan (Turkmen poet)
- Hajim al-Hassani (Arab politician)
- Rafiq Hilmi (Kurdish poet, writer and academic)
- Jirair Hovnanian was an Armenian-American home builder based in New Jersey.
- Kevork Hovnanian (Armenian founder of Hovnanian Enterprises)
- İsmet Hürmüzlü (Turkmen actor)
- Adnan Karim (Kurdish singer)
- Najmiddin Karim (former Kurdish governor of Kirkuk, Neurosurgeon, and founder of The Washington Kurdish Institute)
- Fathi Safwat Kirdar (Turkmen painter)
- Lütfi Kırdar (Turkmen politician, Minister of Health and Social Security in Turkey)
- Nemir Kirdar (Turkmen billionaire, businessman, financier, founder and CEO of Investcorp)
- Younis Mahmoud (Arab Captain of the Iraqi soccer team)
- Rashad Mandan Omar (Turkmen Minister of Science and Technology in the Interim Iraq Governing Council and the Iraqi Interim Government)
- Ali Merdan (Kurdish musician)
- Talib Mushtaq (Turkmen diplomat and Arab nationalist in Iraq during the 1930s)
- Abdul Rahman Mustafa (former Kurdish governor of Kirkuk)
- Kamaran Najm (photojournalist)
- Salih Neftçi (Turkmen engineer and economist)
- Osama Rashid (Arab-Dutch soccer player)
- Arshad al-Salihi (Turkmen, former President of Iraqi Turkmen Front)
- Karekin Simonian, ethniclly Armenian and Iraqi-born Australian internationally recognized referee in Olympic weightlifting and bodybuilding.
- Riza Talabani (Kurdish poet)
- Mehmet Türkmehmet (Turkmen soccer player)
- Rebwar Taha (Kurdish politician, former Governor of Kirkuk)

== Sister cities ==
Kirkuk is twinned with:

- Konya, Turkey

== See also ==
- Arabization
- Chaldean Catholic Archeparchy of Kirkuk-Sulaimaniya
- Kirkuk Massacre of 1924
- Kurdification
- List of largest cities of Iraq
- Operation Fath 1

== Notes ==
=== References ===
- Bosworth (1954). The Encyclopaedia of Islam Vol. V. Brill. pp. 144–147. ISBN 978-90-04-06056-2.
- Edwards, I. E. S.; Gadd, C. J.; Hammond, N. G. L. (1991). The Cambridge Ancient History: Vol. 1, pt. 1. Cambridge University Press. ISBN 9780521227179.
- Edwards, Iorwerth Eiddon Stephen; Charlesworth, Martin Percival; Boardman, John (1970). The Cambridge Ancient History: Vol. 1, part 2. Cambridge University Press. ISBN 9780521077910.
- Morony, Michael (1989a). "BĒṮ GARMĒ". Encyclopaedia Iranica, Vol. IV, Fasc. 2. p. 187.
