= Michael L. Chyet =

American linguist

- Born: 1957 (age 68–69)
- Occupations: Librarian; Linguist
- Known for: Kurdish dictionaries
- Parent: Stanley Chyet

Academic background
- Education: B.A., UCLA (1980); M.A., UC Berkeley (1986); C.Phil., UC Berkeley (1987); Ph.D., UC Berkeley (1991)
- Thesis: 'And a Thornbush Sprang Up Between Them:' Studies of Mem û Zin, a Kurdish Romance. (1991)
- Doctoral advisor: Martin Schwartz

Academic work
- Discipline: Near Eastern Studies
- Institutions: Library of Congress

Michael Lewisohn Chyet (born 1957) is an American linguist and librarian.

== Early life and education ==
He grew up in Cincinnati, Ohio. His father, Stanley Chyet, was a reform rabbi and "a prominent scholar and professor of American Jewish history, translator of Hebrew literature, [and] poet." The family accompanied him on a sabbatical year in Jerusalem when Chyet was 13.

He studied at a Hebrew day school as a youth and learned Latin at prep school, picking up an enthusiasm for languages at age twelve and learning to read in Yiddish, German, French and Russian. He subsequently "mastered Arabic, neo-Aramaic, Turkish, Spanish, Persian, and Serbo-Croatian" and "can handle around 35 languages with varying degrees of fluency" according to a 2003 Jerusalem Post profile. His specialty is Kurdish, which he discovered at age 18, when he was introduced to a folk dance described as belonging to the "Kurdish minority of Eastern Turkey."

Chyet studied Arabic in college, receiving his bachelor's degree from UCLA in 1980. He trained with Interns for Peace in Israel in 1981. He received his Ph.D. in Mideast languages and folklore from the University of California, Berkeley. His dissertation was titled "'And a Thornbush Sprang Up Between Them:' Studies of Mem û Zin, a Kurdish Romance."

== Career ==
He is a cataloguer of Middle Eastern languages at the Library of Congress, having initially joined the Library in fiscal year 2000 as a contract cataloger for Arabic. As of fiscal year 2011, he was responsible for cataloging in "Kurdish; plus Arabic, Persian, Turkish." Formerly, as of 1996, he was senior editor of the Kurdish Service of the Voice of America, where he worked until moving to the Library of Congress. Before that, he was Judaica and Middle East Language specialist in the cataloging department of the University of California, Berkeley's main library. He was also professor of Kurdish at the University of Paris and taught at the Washington Kurdish Institute.

He has written a Kurdish-English dictionary published by Yale University Press. An expanded edition in two volumes (and with a third English-Kurdish volume) was published in 2020. While the first edition used only the Latin alphabet, the second edition also employed the Arabic alphabet.
