= Qishla of Kirkuk =

Ottoman army barracks in Kirkuk, Iraq

Coordinates: 35.47125°N 44.38856°E

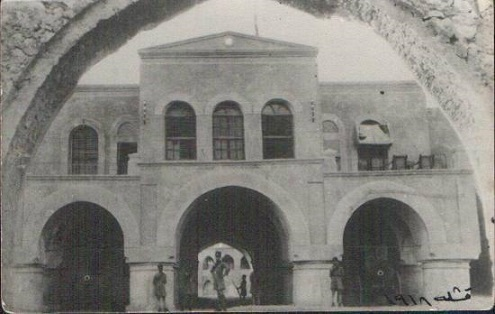
Qishala of Kirkuk

The Qishla of Kirkuk is a historical building in Kirkuk, Iraq.

According to the Ottoman Calendars (Arabic: السالنامات العثمانية), the Qishla was built in 1863 to be the headquarters of the Ottoman army in Kirkuk. The building is located in the city centre, occupying about 6 acres (24,000 m^{2}). The word Qishla is a Turkish word means the place where the army stay at the winter.

According to The Union of the Turkmen Artists, The Institution of Cultural heritage in Kirkuk is planning to repair the south part of the Qishla to make it a cultural centre and a museum.

On the 8th of February 2016, 12 meters of the Qishla collapsed.
