= Washington Kurdish Institute =

American non-profit organization

The Washington Kurdish Institute
- Formation: September 1996; 29 years ago
- Headquarters: Washington, D.C., U.S.
- Website: dckurd.org

Washington Kurdish Institute (Sorani Kurdish: ئینستیتیوتی کوردیی واشینگتن) is a 501(c)(3) educational and research organization focused on Kurds. It was established in Washington DC in September 1996 by Najmiddin Karim, Its objectives are raising awareness of Kurdish issues, promoting human rights in Kurdish areas and supporting development of civil society among Kurds. The institute has a Board of Directors headed by Najmiddin Karim.

It also has an advisory committee composed of renowned Kurdologists such as Martin van Bruinessen, Abbas Vali, Amir Hassanpour and Michael Chyet. The institute offers Kurdish language courses at beginner and advanced levels for both dialects of Sorani and Kurmanji.

Martin van Bruinessen said in 2000 that the Washington Kurdish Institute was "playing an important role in political lobbying on behalf of the Kurds".
