= Ismail Ahmed Rajab Al Hadidi =

Iraqi Kurdish politician

Ismail Ahmed Rajab Al Hadidi is an Iraqi Kurdish politician who served as the deputy governor of Kirkuk. Al Hadidi was born in 1955, and was elected as deputy for the mayor of Kirkuk, Abdul Rahman Mustafa in 2003 by the multiethnic city council of Kirkuk, after a Coalition Provisional Authority's organized election for a local city council in Kirkuk in May 2003, in post-Saddam Iraq. Al Hadidi was wounded in the leg in an assassination attempt in November 2003.
