= Beth Garmai =

Historical region around the city of Kirkuk in northern Iraq

Map showing the Roman-Sasanian borders.

Beth Garmai, (Arabic: باجرمي, lit. 'Bājarmī', Middle Persian: Garamig/Garamīkān/Garmagān, New Persian: Garmakan, Kurdish: Germiyan/گەرمیان, Classical Syriac: ܒܝܬ ܓܪܡܐ, romanized: Bêṯ Garmē, Latin and Greek: Garamaea) is a historical Assyrian region around the city of Kirkuk in northern Iraq. It is located at southeast of the Little Zab, southwest of the mountains of Shahrazor, northeast of the Tigris and Hamrin Mountains, although sometimes including parts of southwest of Hamrin Mountains, and northwest of the Sirwan River.

The name "Beth Garmai" or "Beth Garme" may be of Syriac origin which meaning "the house of bones", which is thought to be a reference to bones of slaughtered Achaemenids after a decisive Macedonian victory in the Battle of Gaugamela. An alternative explanation for the name's origin suggests that it may have been derived from a people, possibly a Persian tribe.

The region was a province, Garmekan, under the Sasanians. It was a prosperous metropolitan province centered at Karkha D'Beth Slokh (Kirkuk), It had a substantial Assyrian population who mostly followed the Church of the East until the fourteenth century, when the region was conquered by Timurlane, who conducted massacres of the indigenous Assyrian population of what is today Northern Iraq, Southeast Turkey and Northeast Syria.

== See also ==
- Beth Garmaï (East Syrian Ecclesiastical Province)
- Assyria
- Assyrian people
- Assyrian Church of the East
- Asuristan
- Beth Nuhadra
- Assur
- Adiabene
- Osroene

== Sources ==
- Wilmshurst, David (2000). The Ecclesiastical Organisation of the Church of the East, 1318–1913. Louvain: Peeters Publishers. ISBN 9789042908765.
- Morony, Michael (1989a). "BĒṮ GARMĒ". Encyclopaedia Iranica, Vol. IV, Fasc. 2. p. 187.
