= Sahdona =

7th-century Syrian bishop and theologian

- Bishop of Mahoze
- See: Beth Garmai
- In office: 640s

Personal details
- Born: ca. 600 Halmon, Sassanid Empire
- Died: ca. 649 Edessa, Rashidun Caliphate

Sahdona of Halmon (Classical Syriac: ܣܗܕܘܢܐ, literally "little martyr") also known as Sahdona of Mahoze and Sahdona the Syrian, Hellenised as Martyrius, was a 7th-century East Syriac monk, theologian and Bishop who later defected to the West Syriac Church before returning to the Church of the East.

== Biography ==
Sahdona was born around 600 AD in the village of Halmon near Beth Nuhadra north of Nineveh. He joined the Beth Abe Monastery at his youth and took part in a delegation headed by the Catholicos Ishoyahb II to seek peace with the Byzantine Empire after the Sasanian defeat in a recent war. Around 635/640 Sahdona was shortly consecrated as the bishop of Mahoze d'Arewan.

=== Defection ===
It seems that Sahdona was part of a delegation to the west and was involved in a debate with the monks of a certain Non-Chalcedonian (i.e. West Syriac) monastery. The monks, defeated, suggested that their opponents see their abbot. Sahdona accepted and after the second debate declared his conversion to the West Syriac Church. He was shortly accused of heresy and deposed. Sahdona first found refuge in Nisibis and later in Edessa. He later returned to the Church of the East but was excommunicated by Ishoyahb II so he stayed for the rest of his life in Edessa where he died around 649 AD.

== Works ==
Sahdona authored the voluminous "Book of Perfection" while a monk in Beth Abe and is considered the most significant work of East Syriac monasticism. He also left several letters to fellow monks concerning monastical rules.
