= Beth Garmaï (East Syriac ecclesiastical province) =

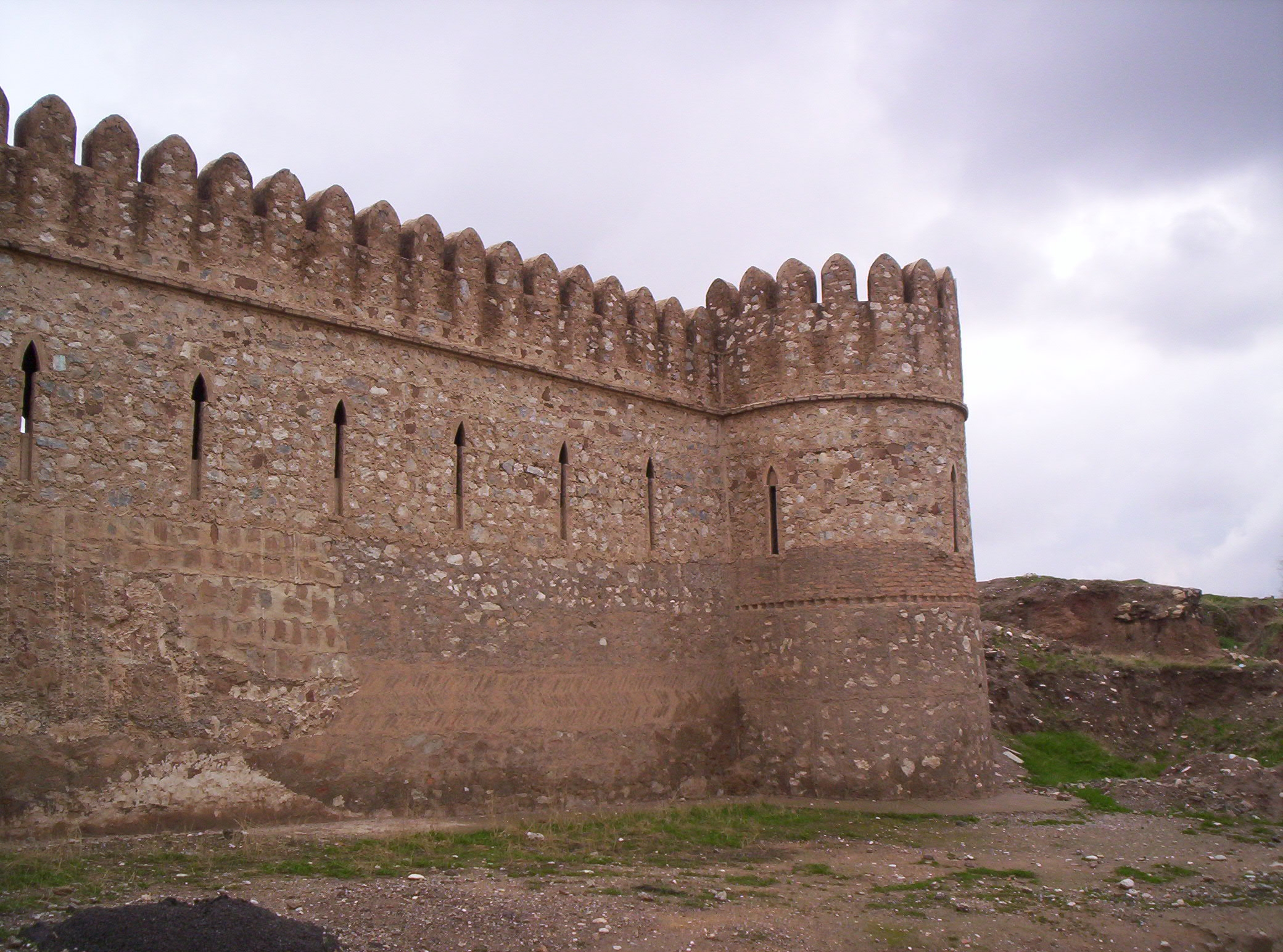
The citadel of Kirkuk

Metropolitanate of Beth Garmai was an East Syriac metropolitan province of the Church of the East between the fifth and fourteenth centuries. The region of Beth Garmai (Syriac: ܒܝܬܓܪܡܝ) is situated in northern Iraq, bounded by the Little Zab and Diyala Rivers and centered on the town of Karka d'Beth Slokh (Syriac: ܟܪܟܐ ܕܒܝܬ ܣܠܘܟ, modern Kirkuk). Several bishops and metropolitans of Beth Garmaï are mentioned between the fourth and fourteenth centuries, residing first at Shahrgard, then at Karka d'Beth Slokh, later at Shahrzur and finally at Daquqa. The known suffragan dioceses of the metropolitan province of Beth Garmaï included Shahrgard, Lashom (ܠܫܘܡ), Khanijar, Mahoze d'Arewan (ܡܚܘܙܐ ܕܐܪܝܘܢ), Radani, Hrbath Glal (ܚܪܒܬܓܠܠ), Tahal and Shahrzur. The suffragan dioceses of 'Darabad' and 'al-Qabba', mentioned respectively by Eliya of Damascus and Mari, are probably to be identified with one or more of these known dioceses. The diocese of Gawkaï, attested in the eighth and ninth centuries, may also have been a suffragan diocese of the province of Beth Garmaï. The last known metropolitan of Beth Garmaï is attested in the thirteenth century, and the last known bishop in 1318, though the historian ʿAmr continued to describe Beth Garmai as a metropolitan province as late as 1348. It is not clear when the province ceased to exist, but the campaigns of Timur Leng between 1390 and 1405 offer a reasonable context.

== Background ==
Before the fourteenth century the Kirkuk region was included in the East Syriac metropolitan province of Beth Garmaï, one of the five great 'provinces of the interior' of the Church of the East.

The bishop of Karka d’Beth Slokh was recognised as metropolitan of Beth Garmaï in Canon XXI of the synod of Isaac in 410. He ranked sixth in precedence (after the metropolitan bishops of Seleucia, Beth Lapat, Nisibis, Prath d'Maishan and Erbil), and was responsible for the suffragan dioceses of Shahrgard, Lashom, Arewan, Radani and Hrbath Glal.

There were several suffragan dioceses in the province of Beth Garmaï at different periods. Within Beth Garmaï itself (the region between the Lesser Zab and Diyala rivers) there were dioceses for Radani, Shahrgard, Lashom, Shahrzur and Tirhan. All of these dioceses except Tirhan (an outlying diocese in the province of the patriarch) were in the province of Beth Garmai. The dioceses of Hrbath Glal and Mahoze d’Arewan in the Lesser Zab valley were geographically in the Erbil region but seem to have been included in the metropolitan province of Beth Garmaï. The seat of the bishops of Mahoze d'Arewan was later transferred to the nearby town of Konishabur, also known as Beth Waziq, and this diocese still had a bishop in 1318. Within the Beth Garmaï region proper, however, only the metropolitan diocese of Daquqa and the diocese of Tirhan (the district between the Tigris and Jabal Hamrin) in the province of the patriarch seem to have survived into the fourteenth century. The last-known bishop of Tirhan, Shemʿon, was present at the consecration of Timothy II in 1318, and the diocese may have met its end during Timur's campaigns in the 1390s. No further bishops are recorded in the Kirkuk region until the early years of the nineteenth century, when a Catholic diocese of Kirkuk (which persists to this day) was established in the 1820s by the patriarchal administrator Augustine Hindi. Later in the nineteenth century a second Catholic diocese was established for the Sehna region in Persia, hitherto part of the diocese of Kirkuk.

Eliya of Damascus listed five suffragan dioceses in the 'eparchy of Bajarmi' in 893, in the following order: Shahrqadat (Shahrgard); Daquqa; al-Bawazikh (Beth Waziq); Darabad; and Khanijar and Lashom.

The diocese of 'al-Qabba' in the province of Beth Garmaï, not attested elsewhere, is said to have been 'added to Wasit' (i.e. transferred to the province of the patriarch) during the reign of the patriarch ʿAbdishoʿ I (963–86), in exchange for the diocese of al-Bawazikh (Beth Waziq).

== The diocese of Karka d'Beth Slokh ==
The bishop Yohannan of Beth Garmaï was present at the Council of Nicaea in 325.

The bishops Shapur and Isaac of Beth Garmaï are mentioned in connection with the persecution of Shapur II (339–79).

The bishop ʿAqballaha, 'bishop of Karka and metropolitan of Beth Garmaï', was present at the synod of Isaac in 410 and subscribed to its acts. He was also among the signatories of the acts of the synod of Dadishoʿ in 424.

The bishop Yohannan, 'bishop of Karka d'Beth Slokh, metropolitan of Beth Garmaï', was among the signatories of the acts of the synod of Acacius in 486.

The deacon and secretary Hormizd was among the signatories of the acts of the synod of Babaï in 497, on behalf of the metropolitan Bokhtishoʿ of Beth Garmaï.

The bishop Dairaya of Karka d'Beth Slokh, 'metropolitan of this town and of all the country of Beth Garmaï', was among the signatories of the acts of the synod of Mar Aba I in 544.

The metropolitan Allaha-zkha of Beth Garmaï adhered by letter to the acts of the synod of Joseph in 554.

The metropolitan Bokhtishoʿ of Beth Garmaï adhered by letter to the acts of the synod of Ishoʿyahb I in 585.

The metropolitan Bokhtishoʿ of Beth Garmaï, perhaps the same man, was among the signatories of the acts of the synod of Gregory in 605.

The monk Gabriel of the monastery of Beth ʿAbe was consecrated metropolitan of Beth Garmaï by the patriarch Sliba-zkha (714–28). Originally from Nisibis, he was surnamed Raqoda, 'the dancer', on account of his effeminate gait.

The monk Ishoʿzkha of the monastery of Beth ʿAbe was elected 'metropolitan bishop of Karka d'Beth Slokh' at an unknown date in the second half of the eighth century or the first half of the ninth century.

The metropolitan Theodore of Beth Garmaï was present at the consecration of the patriarch Yohannan IV in 900.

The metropolitan Ishoʿzkha of Beth Garmaï was one of three bishops who went into hiding in 961 in protest against the election of the patriarch Israel.

The metropolitan Nestorius of Beth Garmaï was present at the consecration of the patriarch Mari on 10 April 987.

The metropolitan Shemʿon, originally bishop of Beth Daraye and later bishop of Kashkar, was metropolitan of Beth Garmaï when Elijah of Nisibis completed his Chronography in 1018/19.

The metropolitan Yahballaha of Beth Garmaï was present at the consecration of the patriarch ʿAbdishoʿ II in 1074.

The bishop David Ibn Barsaha of Hrbath Glal was consecrated metropolitan of Beth Garmaï by the patriarch ʿAbdishoʿ II shortly after his own consecration in 1074.

The bishop Thomas, formerly metropolitan of ʿIlam, was consecrated metropolitan of Beth Garmaï during the reign of the patriarch Eliya II (1111–32).

The patriarch ʿAbdishoʿ III Ibn al-Moqli was metropolitan of Beth Garmaï before his consecration as patriarch in 1139, and was present as metropolitan of Beth Garmaï at the consecration of the patriarch Bar Sawma in 1134.

The metropolitan Eliya of Beth Garmaï was present at the consecration of the patriarch Yahballaha II in 1190.

The patriarch Sabrishoʿ V was metropolitan of Beth Garmaï before his consecration as patriarch in 1226. He was present as metropolitan of 'Daquq' (Beth Garmaï) at the consecration of the patriarch Sabrishoʿ IV in 1222.

The metropolitan Eliya of Beth Garmaï was present at the consecration of the patriarch Denha I in 1265.

The metropolitan Eliya of Beth Garmaï, possibly the same man, was present at the consecration of the patriarch Yahballaha III in 1281.

The bishop Shemʿon of Beth Garmaï was present at the consecration of the patriarch Timothy II in 1318.

== The diocese of Shahrgard ==
The bishop Paul of Shahrgard was confirmed as a suffragan bishop of the metropolitan ʿAqballaha of Beth Garmaï in Canon XXI of the synod of Isaac in 410.

The bishop Paul of Shahrgard was among the signatories of the acts of the synod of Babaï in 497.

The bishop Abraham of Shahrgard was among the signatories of the acts of the synod of Mar Aba I in 544.

The bishop Bar Shabtha of Shahrgard was among the signatories of the acts of the synod of Ezekiel in 576.

The bishop Surin of Shahrgard was among the signatories of the agreement of Bar Qaiti in March 598 and the acts of the synod of Gregory in 605.

The bishop Abraham of Shahrgard was present at the consecration of the patriarch Yohannan IV in 900.

The bishop Abraham, metropolitan of Maishan when Elijah of Nisibis completed his Chronography in 1018/19, was formerly bishop of Sharhrgard.

== The diocese of Lashom ==
The town of Lashom (Syriac: ܠܫܘܡ) was situated 'nine hours' to the south of Kirkuk, close to the town of Daquqa, which had replaced Karka d'Beth Slokh as the seat of the metropolitans of Beth Garmai by the thirteenth century. Wallis Budge has identified Lashom with the village of Lasim, three-quarters of a mile to the southwest of Daquqa.

The bishop Bata of Lashom was confirmed as a suffragan bishop of the metropolitan ʿAqballaha of Beth Garmaï in Canon XXI of the synod of Isaac in 410. He was also among the signatories of the acts of the synod of Dadishoʿ in 424.

The bishop Mikha of Lashom was among the signatories of the acts of the synod of Acacius in 486. He was among the many Persian bishops educated at the School of Edessa before its closure in 489, and is said to have written a commentary on I and II Kings, a discourse on his predecessor Sabrishoʿ, another on a person named Kantropos, and a tract explaining the division of the Nestorian psalter into three sections.

The bishop Abraham of Lashom was among the signatories of the acts of the synod of Babaï in 497.

The bishop Joseph of Lashom was among the signatories of the acts of the synod of Mar Aba I in 544.

The bishop Saba of Lashom was among the signatories of the acts of the synod of Ezekiel in 576.

The bishop (and future patriarch) Sabrishoʿ of Lashom adhered by letter to the acts of the synod of Ishoʿyahb I in 585.

The bishop Ahishma of Lashom was among the signatories of the agreement of Bar Qaiti in March 598.

The patriarch Hnanishoʿ II was bishop of Lashom before his election and consecration as patriarch in 776/7.

The bishop Marqos of Lashom was present at the consecration of the patriarch Yohannan IV in 900.

== The diocese of Khanijar ==
The patriarch Yohannan III (893–9) was earlier bishop of Khanijar, and was transferred from Khanijar to the metropolitan diocese of Mosul during the reign of the patriarch Enosh (877–84).

== The diocese of Mahoze d'Arewan ==
The bishop Yohannan 'of Arewan' was confirmed as a suffragan bishop of the metropolitan ʿAqballaha of Beth Garmaï in Canon XXI of the synod of Isaac in 410.

The bishop Addaï 'of Arewan d'ʿAbra' was among the signatories of the acts of the synod of Dadishoʿ in 424.

The bishop Papa 'of Arewan' was among the signatories of the acts of the synod of Acacius in 486.

The bishop Narsaï of 'Mahoze d'Arewan’ was among the signatories of the acts of the synod of Joseph in 554.

The bishop Samuel of Mahoze d'Arewan was among the signatories of the acts of the synod of Ezekiel in 576.

The bishop Qamishoʿ of Mahoze d'Arewan was among the signatories of the acts of the synod of Ishoʿyahb I in 585.

The bishop Hnanya of Mahoze d'Arewan was among the signatories of the acts of the synod of Gregory in 605.

The monk Sahdona of the monastery of Beth ʿAbe, an eminent East Syriac scholar and bishop of Mahoze d'Arewan whose defection to the West Syriac Church was a source of considerable embarrassment to the Church of the East.

== The diocese of Radani ==
The bishop Narsaï of Radani was confirmed as a suffragan bishop of the metropolitan ʿAqballaha of Beth Garmaï in Canon XXI of the synod of Isaac in 410. He was also among the signatories of the acts of the synod of Dadishoʿ in 424.

== The diocese of Hrbath Glal ==
The bishop Joseph of 'Harbaglal' was confirmed as a suffragan bishop of the metropolitan ʿAqballaha of Beth Garmaï in Canon XXI of the synod of Isaac in 410. He was also among the signatories of the acts of the synod of Dadishoʿ in 424.

The bishop Buzid of Harbaglal was among the signatories of the acts of the synod of Acacius in 486.

The bishop Hudidad of Harbaglal was among the signatories of the acts of the synod of Babaï in 497.

The bishop Bokhtishoʿ of Harbaglal was among the signatories of the acts of the synod of Mar Aba I in 544.

The bishop Gabriel of Harbaglal adhered by letter to the acts of the synod of Joseph in 554.

The bishop Hnana of Harbaglal was among the signatories of the acts of the synod of Ezekiel in 576.

The bishop Gabriel of Harbaglal was among the signatories of the acts of the synods of Ishoʿyahb I in 585 and Gregory in 605.

An unnamed bishop was consecrated for Hrbath Glal by the patriarch Sabrishoʿ III shortly after his own consecration in 1063/4.

The bishop David Ibn Barsaha of Hrbath Glal was consecrated metropolitan of Beth Garmaï by the patriarch ʿAbdishoʿ II shortly after his own consecration in 1074.

== The diocese of Tahal ==
The bishop Bar Haile of Tahal was one of eleven named bishops listed in the acts of the synod of Dadishoʿ in 424 as having been reproved at the synods of Isaac in 410 and Yahballaha I in 420.

The bishop Abraham of Tahal was among the signatories of the acts of the synods of Acacius in 486 and Babaï in 497.

The bishop Marutha of Tahal was among the signatories of the acts of the synod of Mar Aba I in 544.

The bishop Shubhalishoʿ of Tahal was among the signatories of the acts of the synod of Ezekiel in 576.

The bishop Bokhtyazd of Tahal was among the signatories of the acts of the synod of Ishoʿyahb I in 585.

The bishop Qasha of Tahal was among the signatories of the agreement of Bar Qaiti in March 598.

The bishop Piroz of Tahal was among the signatories of the acts of the synod of Gregory in 605.

The bishop ʿAbda of Tahal was present at the consecration of the patriarch Yohannan IV in 900.

== The diocese of Shahrzur ==
The bishop Tahmin of Shahrzur was among the signatories of the acts of the synod of Joseph in 554.

The bishop Nathaniel of Shahrzur was among the signatories of the acts of the synods of Ishoʿyahb I in 585 and Gregory in 605.

The bishop Isaac of Shahrzur was present at the consecration of the patriarch Yohannan IV in 900.

The bishop Abraham of Shahrzur was appointed metropolitan of Maishan during the reign of the patriarch Mari (987–99), after the death of the metropolitan Joseph.

== The diocese of Gawkaï ==
The bishop Yohannan of Gawkaï (ܓܘܟܝ), a town in Beth Garmaï, was among the bishops who witnessed a retraction of the Messallian heresy made by the priest Nestorius of the monastery of Mar Yozadaq in 790 before his consecration as bishop of Beth Nuhadra.

The bishop Hakima of Gawkaï was a contemporary of Thomas of Marga and flourished around the middle of the ninth century.

== Bishops of unspecified dioceses ==
The monks Burdishoʿ, Quriaqos, Babaï and Ishoʿ of the monastery of Beth ʿAbe were bishops of various dioceses in the province of Beth Garmaï at an unknown date in the second half of the eighth century or the first half of the ninth century.

== Topographical Survey ==
The Beth Garmaï region seems to have been at its most flourishing in the sixth and seventh centuries. A number of its towns, villages and monasteries, many unlocalised, are mentioned in several pre-fourteenth century sources, notably Thomas of Marga's Book of Governors and Ishoʿdnah's Book of Chastity. These sources mention the districts of Beth Mshaynane, Beth Gawaya, Hasa and Resha; the towns of Karka d'Beth Slokh (Kirkuk), Daquqa, Lashom (modern Lashin), Khanijar (all at one time or another the seats of East Syriac bishops) and Karkh Guddan; the monasteries of Mar Shubhalmaran and Mar Ezekiel near Daquqa; and the villages of Kafra, Luz, Shabrug (or Shaqrug) and Zark.

Few of these communities are mentioned after the eleventh century, and only two seem to have survived into the fourteenth century. The celebrated monastery of Mar Ezekiel near the town of Daquqa was visited by the monks Rabban Sawma and Marqos in 1280, and is almost certainly to be identified with the monastery of Mar Ezekiel 'in the region of Babylon' mentioned in the report of 1610. An East Syriac community seems also to have survived in Kirkuk itself, next mentioned in the sixteenth century.

Isolated East Syriac communities also persisted around Sehna, a rare survival beyond the Urmi region of historic East Syriac Christianity in Persia, and in Baghdad, once the seat of the East Syriac patriarchs. Towards the end of the eighteenth century the historic diocese of Beth Garmaï was revived with the establishment of the Chaldean diocese of Kirkuk in 1789. For much of the nineteenth century the East Syriac communities of Sehna and Baghdad were included in the Chaldean diocese of Kirkuk.
