= Qaysareyah of Kirkuk =

Coordinates: 25.37574°N 49.58893°E

The Qaysareyah Market is an old market in the city of Kirkuk in Iraq, located near the Kirkuk Citadel. Sources claim it was built in 1855 during the Ottoman Empire era.

The market is arranged to reflect the hours, days, and months of the year. It consists of 365 stores which symbolize the days of the year, 12 small rooms on its second floor for the 12 months of the year, 24 aisles for the hours of the day, and has 7 doors for the days of the week. The market was renovated in 1978.
