= Kamaran Najm =

Iraqi photojournalist (1987–2014)

- کامەران نەجم
- Born: 1987
- Disappeared: June 12, 2014; Mullah Abdullah, a village near Kirkuk
- Occupation: Photo Journalist

Kamaran Najm (Kurdish: کامەران نەجم) is an Iraqi photojournalist. He was captured by the ISIS in June 2014.

== Early life ==
Najm was born in Kirkuk, Iraq, in 1987 to a family of five children. During the Iraq War, his family was displaced and lived in a refugee camp for a period when he was approximately fifteen years old.

== Career ==
Najm has collaborated with international news organizations, including Reuters and the Associated Press. His work has also been featured in prominent publications such as The Washington Post, Vanity Fair, The Times of London, and the Financial Times.

Sebastian Meyer and Kamaran Najm

In 2010, Najm founded Metrography, a photo agency based in Iraq, with American photojournalist Sebastian Meyer. Their vision was to establish an independent photojournalism sector in Iraq that transcends ethnic, cultural, and religious divides. Metrography fosters collaboration and learning among photographers, while celebrating the rich diversity and history of the country. The agency has gained international recognition, with the work of its photographers featured in exhibitions and published by various media outlets.

== Disappearance ==
Najm was captured by militants from the extremist group Islamic State on June 12, 2014, while documenting the war between the militants and Kurdish Peshmerga forces near Mullah Abdullah, a village close to Kirkuk, according to his family and a colleague.
