= Najmiddin Karim =

Iraqi politician (1949–2020)

Najmadin Karim
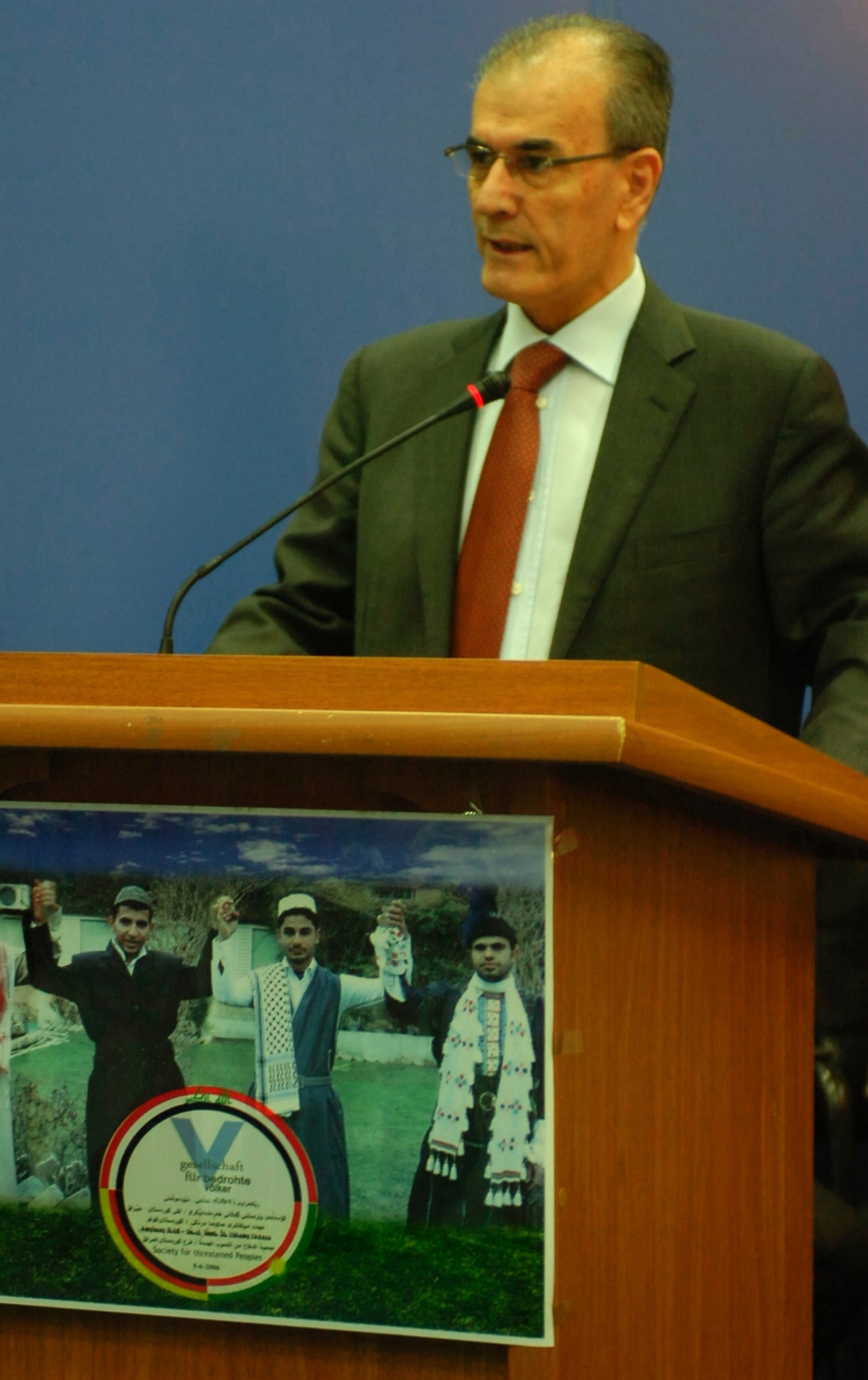

Governor of Kirkuk
- In office 3 April 2011 – 16 October 2017
- Preceded by: Abdul Rahman Mustafa
- Succeeded by: Rakan Al-Jabouri

Member of the Council of Representatives
- In office 7 March 2010 – 2 April 2011
- Parliamentary group: Patriotic Union of Kurdistan
- Constituency: Kirkuk

Personal details
- Born: 1949 Kirkuk, Iraq
- Died: 31 October 2020 (aged 71) Washington, D.C., United States
- Cause of death: stroke following diagnosis of pancreatic cancer in fall of 2019
- Citizenship: Iraq; United States
- Party: Independent
- Other political affiliations: Patriotic Union of Kurdistan
- Spouse: Zozan
- Relations: Bakhtiyar (brother) farhand(brother); Azad (brother)
- Children: 4 (Three sons and a daughter)
- Education: George Washington University; University of Mosul
- Profession: Neurosurgeon

Military service
- Branch/service: Peshmerga
- Years of service: 1972–1975

Najmiddin Karim (Kurdish: نەجمەدین کەریم; 1949 – 31 October 2020), also known as Najmadin Karim, was an Iraqi Kurdish politician who was governor of Kirkuk Governorate from 2011 to 2017. Prior to the invasion of Iraq, Karim had served in numerous Kurdish and Iraqi opposition groups.

== Early years ==
Karim was born in Kirkuk in 1949, and lived there until he completed secondary school, when he moved to Mosul, where he studied medicine at the Mosul Medical College. Karim became involved in politics at university, being elected to the leadership of the Kurdish Student Union in 1971, and then later joining the Peshmerga in 1972.

Karim left Iraq in 1975. He later completed neurosurgery training at George Washington University, and started his own medical practice in the Washington, D.C. area. Karim became an American citizen and lived in the United States until 2009, when he returned to Kirkuk. In addition to Kurdish activism in the U.S., Karim was active in the Iraqi opposition aimed at removing the regime of Saddam Hussein. Dr. Karim co-founded the Kurdish National Congress of North America, established the Washington Kurdish Institute, worked with the Senate and State Department to provide Kurdish-language programming on Voice of America, and made frequent appearances on major news outlets.

== Return to Iraq ==
Karim returned to Iraq in 2009 to stand for the Kurdistan Alliance in the parliamentary election, and was elected as a member of parliament for Kirkuk. He was subsequently elected as governor of Kirkuk Governorate by Kirkuk's Governorate Council on 29 March 2011. He was sworn in as the governor on 3 April 2011. Dr. Karim was the head of the Patriotic Union of Kurdistan's Kirkuk list in the 2014 general elections where he drew enormous support across ethnic groups with over 150,000 votes. This led to the Kurdish dominance in provincial representation. Dr. Karim's non-partisan work for all Kirkukis became evident at the polls.

On 14 September 2017, Karim was removed from the governorship by the Iraqi parliament for holding the Kurdish referendum in Kirkuk. Karim however stated he will not follow the dismissal order and will stay in office. The provincial council meanwhile condemned the decision of the parliament with council head Ribwar al-Talabani claiming only the council had the power to remove him. In October 2017, Karim had to leave the city of Kirkuk after Iran-backed militias and the Iraqi federal army entered the province.

Baghdad also ordered his arrest in September 2017 in connection with the referendum. In the following May, the Kirkuk Court of Appeal issued a warrant for his arrest and an order to seize his assets. He was accused of corruption in connection with Project "Kirkuk Eagle", which aimed to wirelessly monitor vehicle movements into and out of the province to prevent theft, which the court claimed was a fraud. He was arrested in Lebanon in May 2019 on an Interpol request. He was released several days later, after Iraqi Kurdish officials intervened. In October, it was announced that the Supreme Anti-Corruption Council had referred his case to stand trial.

== Personal life ==
Karim had both Iraqi and American citizenship, and prior to his return to Iraq lived in the United States with his wife and family, where he ran his medical practice. Karim was a member of the Patriotic Union of Kurdistan until 16 February 2019, where the PUK officially terminated his membership in the party 8 months after his official resignation letter that he sent to the acting general secretary of PUK of that time Kosrat Rasul Ali.

== Death ==
On 31 October 2020, Karim died in hospital in the United States at the age of 71. He was diagnosed with Pancreatic Cancer around fall of 2019. Pancreatic cancer dramatically increases the chance of both ischemic and hemorrhagic stroke.
