= Rakan Al-Jabouri =

Iraqi politician

Rakan Saeed al-Jabouri
- راکان سعید الجبوري

President of The Arab Alliance in Kirkuk
- Incumbent
- Assumed office 20 October 2018
- Preceded by: position established

Acting Governor of Kirkuk
- In office 16 October 2017 – 14 August 2024
- Preceded by: Najmiddin Karim
- Succeeded by: Rebwar Taha

Personal details
- Born: 1 July 1964 (age 62) Kirkuk, Iraq
- Party: Arab Alliance in Kirkuk

Rakan Saeed Al-Jabouri (Arabic: راکان سعید الجبوري / Sorani Kurdish: ڕاکان سەعید جبوری) (born July 1, 1964) is the president of The Arab Alliance in Kirkuk. Jabouri also served as the acting Governor of Kirkuk Province from 16th October 2017 Until 14th August 2024.

== Early life ==
Jabouri was born in Kirkuk on 1 July 1964.

== Career ==
Prior to becoming the acting governor of Kirkuk Province he served as the deputy governor of kirkuk from 2005 until 2017 when he assumed office as Acting Governor.

== Corruption charges ==
On 21 April 2025 after a detention issued by Karkh Investigative Court, Jabouri was detained in Baghdad for charges related to misuse of public funds. but a day later on 22 he was released by bail. On 15 July 2025 Baghdad’s Karkh Criminal Court sentenced Jabouri to one year in prison but his sentence was later suspended. On 24 August 2025 he was banned from running in elections by the Independent High Electoral Commission. This decision was upheld by the Election Judiciary Commission 9 on October 2025.

== See also ==
- Hawija
- Kirkuk Governorate
