= Syriac Renaissance =

Revival of Syriac literary culture in the 11th-13th centuries

The Syriac Renaissance is a modern scholarly term for a revival of Syriac literary, scholarly, artistic, and ecclesiastical culture, usually dated from the eleventh to the thirteenth centuries. It's breadth resembles an earlier era of Syriac literature, the "Syriac Golden Age", which took place in the 3rd–7th centuries. This Renaissance (not to be confused with the European Renaissance) is often associated with the learned culture of the Syriac Orthodox Church and the Church of the East under Islamic and Mongol rule, especially in northern Mesopotamia, Syria, and adjoining regions. The period is noted for renewed work in Classical Syriac, the compilation and reworking of older traditions, the production of grammars, lexica, major works of historiography, theological and legal treatises, poetry, and the Syriac reception of Arabic and Persian learning.

The term was introduced by Anton Baumstark in his 1922 history of Syriac literature and has remained common, though scholars use it with caution. It is not equivalent to the concept of the European Renaissance, and it does not denote the return to the expression of Syriac literature in late antiquity.

== Terminology and chronology ==
The expression "Syriac Renaissance" belongs to a wider early twentieth-century habit of using renaissance for medieval cultural revivals, including Charles Homer Haskins's "renaissance of the twelfth century" in the Latin West and Adam Mez's "renaissance of Islam". In Syriac studies, Baumstark applied the idea to the flourishing of Syriac writing in the later Middle Ages. It has also been compared to revivals in other languages such across the Eastern Christian cultures.

The period is normally placed between the eleventh and thirteenth centuries, with the twelfth and thirteenth centuries forming its strongest phase. It came after the increasing dominance of Arabic in the Middle East, but before the sharp contraction of many Syriac institutions after the Islamization of the Mongol Ilkhanate and the political disruptions of the fourteenth century. The chronological limits are therefore approximate: some authors include eleventh-century figures such as Eliya of Nisibis, while others focus on the era of Michael the Great, Dionysius bar Salibi, Jacob bar Shakko, Bar Hebraeus, and Abdisho bar Brikha.

== Historical setting ==
The Syriac Renaissance developed in a politically fragmented but culturally connected medieval Middle East. Syriac Christian communities lived under a huge diversity of political leaderships depending on the region (including Seljuk, Artuqid, Zengid, Ayyubid, Crusader, Armenian, and Mongol) and they interacted with the literary traditions of many other languages (including Arabic, Armenian, Greek, and Persian).

== Language and identity ==
A central feature of the period was renewed attention to the Syriac language itself. As a valued sacred, ecclesiastical, and literary language, many writers treated Syriac as an important marker of Suryoye identity while in the context of interactions with a more prevalent Arabic culture. Bar Hebraeus, for example, wrote mainly in Syriac but also composed works in Arabic and translated Arabic philosophical material into Syriac.

== Intellectual culture ==
Syriac writers of the period were active in grammar, logic, natural philosophy, medicine, astronomy, and theology. Some of this work preserved older Greek learning through Syriac channels, while other works drew on Arabic philosophy, especially the traditions associated with Avicenna, al-Ghazali, Fakhr al-Din al-Razi, and Nasir al-Din al-Tusi.

Jacob bar Shakko's Book of Dialogues and Bar Hebraeus's Cream of Wisdom are major examples of the encyclopedic and pedagogical tendencies of the period. Both authors adapted the Aristotelian curriculum for a Syriac audience and ultimately played the role of serving Syriac as a language of advanced scholarship in a world where Arabic enjoyed high prestige.

Bar Hebraeus is often seen as an emblematic figure of the Syriac Renaissance. He wrote in Syriac and Arabic, used Syriac, Arabic, Persian, and possibly Armenian materials, and consulted books in the library of Maragha under the Mongol Ilkhanids. His writings cover theology, exegesis, grammar, philosophy, medicine, law, history, poetry, ethics, and ascetic literature.

== Literature ==
The literature produced during the Syriac Renaissance included both poetry and prose and covered many genres. These genres included biblical commentaries, doctrinal treatises and explanations of church teaching, liturgical texts, ascetic literature, and more. Some of the most famous liturgical poets of the period included Gewargis Warda and Khamis bar Qardahe became important liturgical poets. The Paradise of Eden of Abdisho bar Brikha inccorporated poetic techniques adopted from Arabic maqama. Bar Hebraeus also composed secular and religious poetry, with his Laughable Stories creatively adapting Arabic adab literature.

=== Historiography ===
The Syriac Renaissance produced many monumental works of historiography. The three most famous are the chronicle of Michael the Syrian, the anonymous Chronicle of 1234, and the Chronicle of Bar Hebraeus. Through these three writings, many more otherwise lost works have also reached the present day.

The Church of the East also produced historical and bibliographical works. The History of Mar Yahballaha and Rabban Sauma, written in the early fourteenth century, preserves the story of two East Syriac monks from China and the diplomatic journey of Rabban Sauma to the West. Furthermore, Abdisho bar Brikha wrote a metrical catalogue of ecclesiastical books, which went on tpo become the first major history of Syriac literature which contains to be an important source for modern scholarship.

=== Law ===
During the Syriac Renaissance, the jurists of the Syriac Orthodox and East Syriac worlds wrote numerous canons, legal collections, and law books. These works touched on all areas of society: ecclesiastical affairs, family law, inheritance, property, clergy, monasteries, schools, and relations with other legal authorities. Bar Hebraeus's Nomocanon is the main surviving Syriac Orthodox legal collection of the period. In the Church of the East, normative trends have been set by the legal literature of Abdisho bar Brikha.

== Major figures ==
Major figures associated with the Syriac Renaissance include:

- Eliya of Nisibis (975-1046), bishop, theologian, historian, grammarian, and lexicographer of the Church of the East.
- Michael the Great (1126-1199), Syriac Orthodox patriarch and author of a major universal chronicle.
- Dionysius bar Salibi (d. 1171), Syriac Orthodox bishop, commentator, theologian, and polemicist.
- Jacob bar Shakko (d. 1241), Syriac Orthodox scholar of grammar, philosophy, theology, and encyclopedic learning.
- Bar Hebraeus (1225/6-1286), Syriac Orthodox maphrian, polymath, historian, philosopher, grammarian, physician, theologian, poet, and legal writer.
- Gewargis Warda (13th century), East Syriac liturgical poet.
- Khamis bar Qardahe (13th century), East Syriac priest and poet known especially for liturgical poetry.
- Abdisho bar Brikha (d. 1318), East Syriac metropolitan, poet, theologian, canonist, and author of a catalogue of Syriac writers.

== See also ==
- Syriac literature
- Syriac Christianity
- Christian literature
- Bar Hebraeus
- Michael the Syrian
- Abdisho bar Brikha
