= Syriac Golden Age =

The Syriac Golden Age is a period which saw a remarkable number of authors of Syriac literature. The concept of the Golden Age of Syriac was created by Sebastian Brock. Brock placed the Golden Age in the 3rd–7th centuries, whereas others have also placed it in the 5th–9th centuries. Summing up this period:

The 5th to 9th centuries mark the Golden Age of Syriac, with more than 70 important known authors, not counting numerous anonymous works and lesser authors. These writings cover philosophy, logic, medicine, mathematics, astronomy, alchemy, history, theology, linguistics, and literature. Under the Arabs, Syriac was the vehicle by which the Greek sciences passed to the Muslim world, and later to Europe through Spain, marking Syriac as an important stage in the history of world civilization. (George Kiraz)

The golden age of Syriac literature (5th to 9th century) witnessed an explosion of writings, from poetry (Narsai and Jacob of Serugh), biblical commentators (Ishodad of Merv and John of Dara), and grammar (Jacob of Edessa), to astronomy and mathematics (Sergius of Resh Aina, Severus Sebokht, and George of the Arabs). (John Carranza)

The third century saw the rise of the first known Syriac literature. Most works in this time were still anonymous, with the exception of those of Bardaisan. In the fourth century, the Syriac language saw the rise of its first great authors, including Aphrahat, the author of the Demonstrations, and Ephrem the Syrian, widely seen as the greatest Syriac poet, who wrote hundreds of works that have survived until the present day, including his Hymns on Paradise. The fifth and sixth centuries saw the rise of the likes of Narsai and Jacob of Serugh, active in educational and spiritual centers of the Syriac Christian world like the School of Nisibis and the School of Edessa. This period also witnessed a systematic introduction of Hellenism (Greek culture) into the Syriac literary world.

Ultimately, the Syriac Golden Age came to a close as the Arabic language was spread and gained cultural ascendance in the aftermath of the early Muslim conquests. A revival of literary production in the Syriac language took place a few centuries later again, in what is known as the Syriac Renaissance (11th–13th centuries).
