= History of Mar Yahballaha and Rabban Sauma =

14th-century Syriac book

- First page of the History in the manuscript Yale Syriac 327. The decoration is "a typical East-Syriac portal".
- Author: Anonymous
- Translator: James A. Montgomery; Sebastian P. Brock; Ernest A. W. Budge
- Language: Classical Syriac
- Genre: Biography, travelogue
- Publication date: c. 1317–19
- English publication date: 1927 (partial); 1928 (complete)
- Dewey Decimal: 950.2
- LC Class: DS752 .T3713

The History of Mar Yahballaha and Rabban Sauma is an anonymous double biography of two monks of the Church of the East, Rabban Mark, who was later elected patriarch as Yahballaha III, and Rabban Sauma. It is a contemporary source, completed between 1317 and 1319 and drawing in part on the accounts of the protagonists themselves. Although now regarded as a major work of Syriac literature, it was largely unknown until its rediscovery in the late 19th century.

The History covers the lives of Mark-Yahballaha and Sauma from their births in China until their deaths in Iraq with a focus on their extensive travels across the Mongol Empire and beyond. Although they set out from China intending to visit Jerusalem, neither ever did. Sauma was dispatched on an embassy to Western Europe on behalf of the Ilkhanate, while Mark was elected patriarch.

== Genre ==
The History is a dual biography with the characteristics of a chronicle or history. In the prologue, the author is explicit about combining these genres. He will include biographical "details of their families, their country, and the peculiar way they were raised and the life they spent together" and "also write about the occurences of their time", at least as they are directly pertinent to the main biographical purpose. The story of the two well-travelled churchmen is taken to illustrate the truth of Christ's promise in Matthew 28:20b: "Lo, I am with you always, even unto the end of the world".

Features of hagiography are evident in the coverage of Yahballaha and Sauma's early lives, but miracles and supernatural events play no role in the main narrative. The author even occasionally criticizes the protagonists.

Pier Giorgio Borbone discusses the possibility that the History should be classed with the Chronography of Barhebraeus, the Compendium of Chronicles of Rashid al-Din and the History of the World Conqueror by Juvayni as part of "the spurt of interest in historiography witnessed in the Mongol period", especially the history of different peoples. There is evidence that the author knew the work of Juvayni.

== Language and style ==
The History belongs to the period known as the Syriac Renaissance, a time when Classical Syriac was experiencing a revival but Arabic was gaining ground as a spoken and written language in Christian circles. Syriac authors who wanted a wider audience increasingly chose Arabic. Barhebraeus even translated his Compendium of Chronicles for this reason. It is possible that the author of the History chose Syriac precisely to limit its audience and prevent its criticisms of those in power from reaching an audience outside the church. In at least one instance, he deviates from the norm of Classical Syriac, using a word in its colloquial Aramaic sense, as influenced Persian and Arabic.

The writing is lively and detailed, making frequent use of direct speech. Poetic quotations drawn from the Syriac Bible or the East Syriac liturgy are used to explain or elaborate, an unusual feature in Syriac that the author has borrowed from Persian literature and Arabic adab. Also adopted from Arabic literature is the use of epithets when introduced persons. The History employs many foreign words for which the author supplies a definition. These include technical terms and words used in direct speech. His language otherwise includes many loanwords of Arabic, Persian, Turkic, Mongolian and Latin origin, including many hapax legomena.

In general, the History uses titles and names of kingdoms as if proper names. Thus, the great khan is Qaʾan (khagan), the Byzantine emperor Basileos (basileus), the king of France Fransis and the king of England Ingaltar (Angleterre). Sometimes the names are simply phonetic renderings, as in the case of Irad Sharlado (from French roi Charles le deux) and Irad Arkon (roi d'Aragon). The Armenian king is given the nickname Takapor, which comes from the Armenian word for "king".

== Synopsis ==
The History covers a period of almost a century, beginning with the birth of Rabban Sauma around 1225 and ending with the death of Yahballaha in 1317. It dates events by the Seleucid era and the months of the Syriac calendar. Although most of the action takes place in the heartland of the Church of the East in Iraq (Mesopotamia) and Iran, the narrative stretches from China to Western Europe. It is an important witness to the Pax Mongolica, a period of unprecedented connectedness across Eurasia under the rule of the Mongol Empire.

The History is divided into a prologue and 29 sections. The text's first editor, Paul Bedjan, distinguished most of these by adding descriptive titles of his own in Syriac. These are retained in the latest edition and translation by Borbone. The original section titles are rubricated in the manuscripts.

Concerning the structure of the History, Borbone writes:

The theme of the journey appears to be the underlying structure of the History, and it takes on various forms. The first is that of pilgrimage, which will disclose the monks' unexpected destiny; the second is that of an embassy that possibly makes Rabban Sauma the first traveller from China to the Atlantic; the third is less readily apparent, and concerns the continuous perambulations marking the life of the catholicos [Patriarch Yahballaha], from one seat to another, in the hope of sorting out issues within the Church, or to "serve the Mongols".

In the first part, the actual journey from China to Iraq is covered somewhat perfunctorily. This journey is a pilgrimage and the goal is Jerusalem, but the earthly Jerusalem is of secondary importance of the heavenly Jerusalem. In the second part, Rabban Sauma travels to Europe as an envoy of Khan Arghun. This journey is described in much greater detail.

=== Journey from China to Iraq ===
The first section describes the birth of Sauma around 1225 to a Christian husband and wife in Khanbaliq. Drawn to asceticism, he became a vegetarian and abstained from alcohol. After professing as a monk before George, bishop of Khanbaliq, he lived in a cell for seven years. Around 1255, he began life as a hermit in a cave by a mountain spring. The second section concerns Mark (Yahballaha), who born in 1245, the youngest of four sons in a Christian family in Koshang in Inner Mongolia. He studied under Sauma for three years before he was tonsured as a monk by Bishop Nestorius, George's successor, around 1263. The third section describes how they resolved to go to Jerusalem:

One day they came up with a plan: "If we left this land for the West, we would have a lot to gain in receiving the blessings of the shrines of the holy martyrs and the fathers of the Church; then if Christ, the omnipotent Lord, prolonged our lives and sustained us with His grace, we might reach Jerusalem and attain complete atonement for our faults and the remittal of our sins."

The History does not provide a date for the start of the monks' journey. They arrived in Iraq in 1275 and therefore probably set out in 1273. Their journey began at the hermitage where they lived, which itself was a journey of fifteen days from Koshang. They first travelled to the Chinese capital, Khanbaliq, one day away, seeking companions and provisions, which they could not secure until travelling to Koshang. They then travelled to Tangut and after two more months reached Khotan, where they rested for six months before moving on to Kashgar. The author notes that Khotan was a scene of devastation owing to the recent presence of rebellious Prince Hoqu, who had joined Kaidu in rebellion against Kublai Khan.

In their travels as far as Kashgar, the monks followed the same route as Marco Polo but in reverse. From Kashgar, however, they moved north to Talas, where they obtained a safe conduct from the Khan Kaidu. The vast distances from Talas to Tus and from Tus to Maragha are covered in a few sentences. In Tus, they visited a monastery. In Maragha, they met the Patriarch Denha I. Afterwards, they visited Baghdad, the nominal centre of their church. They thus completed the first step of their pilgrimage. Somewhat later, after settling for a time in the monastery of Saint Michael of Tarʿel in Erbil, Sauma and Mark travelled to Ani in Armenia and thence to Georgia in an attempt to reach Jerusalem, probably by sea from Trebizond, so as to avoid Mamluk territory. The roads in Georgia, however, were closed due to banditry. In Ani, they are said to be "bewildered by the imposing and beautiful buildings".

=== Journey to Europe ===
In the second part, Rabban Sauma travels to Western Europe as an ambassador of Arghun, seeking an alliance between the Mongols and the West with the goal of conquering Palestine and Syria. He was recommended to the khan by Yahballaha. Arghun gave him gifts and letters for the rulers of Europe, as well as jarligs and a paiza. Yahballaha also gave him a letter and gifts. The History refers to the Europeans as Greeks and Franks, and uses the term Romans as a synonym for either.

Sauma sailed from an unidentified port on the Black Sea to Constantinople, where he met the emperor and toured the city's shrines. He then sailed to Naples, which took two months. After noting the volcanic eruption which Sauma witnessed while passing Sicily, the author puns on the name of Italy, suggesting that it gets its name from the attalyā (dragon) that lives beneath the volcano. In Naples, from the roof of his dwelling, he witnessed the Battle of the Counts, in which the fleet of Peter III of Aragon defeated that of Charles II of Naples, on 23 June 1287. He and his entourage "wondered at the customs of the Franks, who did not harm anybody, apart from the combatants", in contrast to the typical practices of the Mongols. From Naples, they travelled by horse to Rome. They "were marvelled to see that no region was devoid of buildings". Sauma arrived in Rome during a papal vacancy and was examined by the College of Cardinals. He provided a creedal statement and engaged in theological debate regarding the Trinity and the doctrine of the double procession of the Holy Spirit. Afterwards, he was given a guided tour of the shrines of Rome. The History always notes the churches he visited and the relics they contained. According to Borbone, the religious focus of Sauma's account of Europe is probably a result of the author's editing out "secular" information not germane to his purpose.

From Rome, Sauma travelled to Tuscany; to Genoa, where he noted the practice of electing a doge; and thence to a place called Onbar, probably Lombardy. The History notes the unusual Lenten practices in Lombardy, possibly an echo of Sauma's encounter with the Ambrosian rite. From Italy, Sauma travelled to Paris, where he stayed for a month and was received by the king and what the text calls the king's amirs. He was impressed by the University of Paris, which is said to have 30,000 scholars, and the Basilica of Saint-Denis, which is the mauseoleum of French kings. The History records that the king of France said, "I will send with you one of the most important amirs who are at my side to convey my reply to King Arghun," but does not name the envoy. (He was Gobert of Helleville and he was accompanied by Robert of Senlis, William of Bruyères and Odard. They travelled with Sauma and his party.) From Paris, Sauma travelled to Gascony to meet the king of England, who took communion from him.

Sauma spent the winter of 1287–1288 in Genoa, where he was met by the papal legate Giovanni Boccamazza returning from Germany. While he was there, Pope Nicholas IV, who had met Sauma as a cardinal the year before, was elected pope. Sauma returned to Rome, where he celebrated Mass before the pope and cardinals on Passion Sunday (aynāw āsyā). They are said to have proclaimed, "The language is different, but the rite is the same!" The History then describes the Roman celebration of Passiontide in detail. The pope gave Sauma letters confirming his and Mar Yahballaha's authority, gifts for the patriarch, money to cover his travel expenses and gifts for Arghun.

Sauma's return journey from Europe by sea and to the court of Arghun is not detailed. Only after describing his audience with Arghun does the author explain that the preceding account of Sauma's journey is an edited and abridge version of Sauma's own report:

Since it is not our aim to write a full account of what Rabban Sauma did and the things he saw, we have considerably shortened what he personally wrote in the Persian language, and the things mentioned here have been added to or abridged, as appropriate.

=== Journeys of court and patriarch ===
Arghun granted Sauma a portable church attached to the itinerant Mongol court: "When the camp moved, the priests moved the church along, with all its contents." The death of Arghun in May 1291 is represented as a turning point:

Who does not suffer following a shift in power? How could that not be a difficult situation for anybody, and a bitter one to describe? When one knows all the king's noblemen and all the members of the royal house, not to mention the kings of one's time! The Church found itself in this incertitude for some time . . .

Under the new king, Geikhatu, Sauma requested permission to build a permanent church in Maragha because he was too old to move constantly with the camp. After his new church was completed, he fell ill in October 1293 and died in Baghdad in January 1294.

The year 1295 saw civil war and the assassinations successively of Geikhatu and Baydu. The History notes hyperbolically that "we thought God had definitively abandoned his Church". In 1295–1296, the amir Nawrūz launched a major persecution of the Christians of Maragha, who were defended by the Armenian king Hethum II. Although Yahballaha received some restitution from Ghazan, Nawrūz engineered another attack on the church in Maragha in 1296–1297. Again Ghazan intervened in support of Yahaballaha, but little of the looted wealth was recovered.

== Authorship and date ==
The History is anonymous. A description of a now lost manuscript made by the priest Oshaʾna Sarau for a catalogue of the manuscripts of the American mission in Urmia describes the author as "archdeacon of the patriarchal see". The source of this information is uncertain, as it does not appear in any surviving manuscript. This identification is consistent with the internal evidence that the author was a high-ranking cleric (his knowledge of Syriac, theology and high politics). Heleen Murre-van den Berg suggests that the author was Yahballaha's successor as patriarch, Timothy II. He was the metropolitan of Erbil before his election and as such is the only important person to appear in the History without being named.

The author relied primarily on eyewitness accounts, especially those of Yahballaha and Sauma themselves. He was an eyewitness himself at least to the attacks on churches in Maragha in 1295. The only written source he cites is Sauma's account of his European embassy. Since he refers to the Emir Irinjin as still living, he must have completed the work between the death of Yahballaha in 1317 and the death of Irinjin in June 1319.

== Manuscripts, editions and translations ==
A manuscript of the History was found in a church in Minyanish in 1883 or 1884. A local monk, Rabban Yonan, made a copy of it, which was brought by the priest Oshaʾna Sarau to the American mission in Urmia in 1885. Further copies were produced in Urmia. In October 1886, at the a meeting of the American Oriental Society in New Haven, the American missionary Isaac Hollister Hall announced the discovery. He himself had seen one of the copies produced at Urmia and reported that the original had been given to the patriarch, Shimun XVIII, and was being kept in Qudshanis.

The first published version of the History was a transcribed oral Neo-Aramaic translation made by Oshaʾna, which was published in the American missionaries' journal Zāhīri d-Bāhrā in eight installments between October 1885 and May 1886. This publication circulated only locally. The Catholic priest Paul Bedjan published the first edition of the original Syriac text in Paris in 1888 from a manuscript copied by Désiré Salomon in Urmia in March 1887. Bedjan's publication made the text widely known, since the proceedings of the 1886 meeting of the American Oriental Society announcing the discovery of the text were only published in 1889. In 1895, Bedjan published a new critical edition of the text based on four more manuscripts, none older than the 1880s.

The second published translation of the History and the first in a European language was a French translation by Jean-Baptiste Chabot based on Bedjan's 1888 edition. Based on the 1895 edition, there have been two partial translations into English by James A. Montgomery (1927) and Sebastian P. Brock (1969) and one complete translation by Ernest A. W. Budge (1928); a complete translation into Russian by Nina Pigulevskaya (1958); a second complete translation into Neo-Aramaic by Mattay d-bet-Paṭros (1961); one partial translation into German by Franz Altheim (1961) and one complete translation by Alexander Toepel (2008); and a partial Arabic translation by Louis Sako (1974).

Pier Giorgio Borbone has translated the text into Italian (2000) and French (2008) on the basis of the 1895 edition. He has also produced a new Syriac edition on the basis of three manuscripts with a new English translation (2021). Although at least six or seven manuscripts were produced from the archetype in the 1880s, the three manuscripts used by Borbone are the only three currently in existence:

- London, British Library, Or. 3636, made in 1889 and used by Bedjan
- London, British Library, Or. 9379
- New Haven, Andover Newton Theological Seminary, Yale Syriac 327

These manuscripts are described in detail by Borbone.

== Bibliography ==
- Borbone, Pier Giorgio, ed. (2021a). History of Mar Yahballaha and Rabban Sauma. Translated by Laura E. Parodi. Hamburg: Verlag tredition.
- Borbone, Pier Giorgio (2021b). "The History of Mar Yahballaha and Rabban Sawma as a Source for Ilkhanid History". In Timothy May; Bayarsaikhan Dashdondog; Christopher P. Atwood (eds.). New Approaches to Ilkhanid History. Brill. pp. 349–372.
- Carlson, Thomas A., ed. (2026). The History of Mar Yahballaha and Rabban Sawma. Hackett Publishing. This is a revised annotated edition of the Borbone–Parodi translation.
- Murre-van den Berg, Heleen L. (2006). "The Church of the East in Mesopotamia in the Early Fourteenth Century". In Roman Malek (ed.). Jingjiao: The Church of the East in China and Central Asia. Institut Monumenta Serica.
- Rossabi, Morris (2010) [1992]. Voyager from Xanadu: Rabban Sauma and the First Journey from China to the West. University of California Press.
