= Isaac of Seleucia =

Isaac of Seleucia (died 410) was a Patriarch of the Persian Church, who is celebrated among the Catholicoi, the patriarchs of the Persian Church, for having reorganized the Church after the persecution that overwhelmed it under Shapûr II.

== Biography ==
According to the most probable tradition he was enabled through the influence he had with King Yazdgerd I, to restore the Catholicate (patriarchate) of Seleucia, which had been vacant for twenty-two years. Another account says he was chosen to replace a certain Qayom, who had been deposed by his fellow-bishops for incapacity.

Isaac's great work was the organizing of the Council of Seleucia, the equivalent for the Eastern Syrian Church of the First Council of Nicaea. The Persian bishops met under the express orders of the monarch at the capital of the Sassanide kingdom. Isaac presided, in concert with Maruthas of Martyropolis, whom the "Western Fathers", i.e., the bishops of the Syrian Province of Antioch, had delegated to assist in the reorganization of the Christian religion in Persia. Two Persian nobles and the Grand Vizier, who represented the king at this important assembly, promulgated a decree authorizing the Christians to practice their religion and to construct churches. They recognized Isaac, the Catholicos of Seleucia, as the sole official head of the Persian Christians, and declared that the secular arm would repress all who were insubordinate to him.

Shortly after this great success, which assured the unification and the stability of the Persian Church, Isaac died in 410.
