= Isa Kelemechi =

Mongol scientist and diplomat

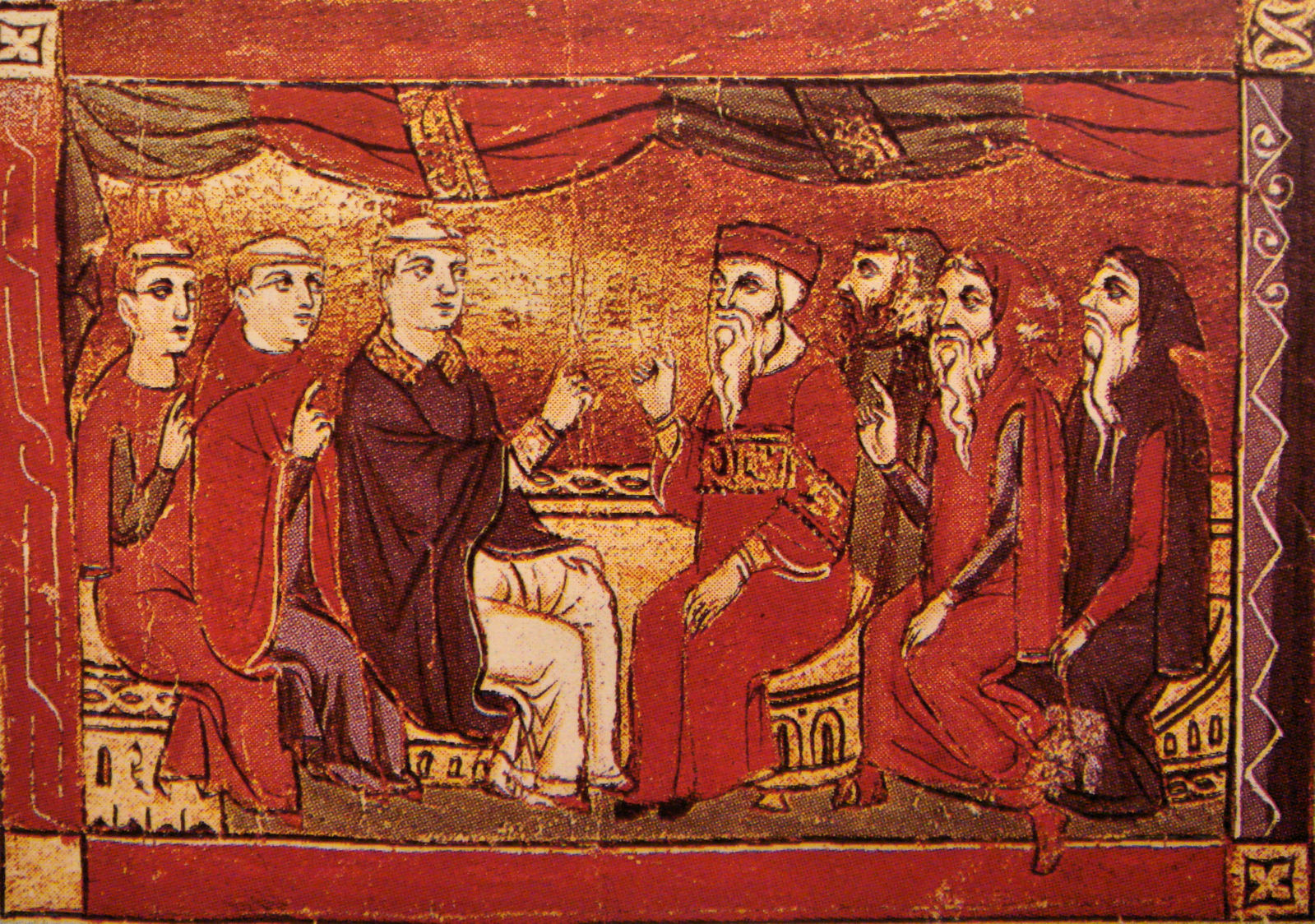
Debate between Catholics (left) and Church of the East Christians (right) in the 13th century. Acre, Kingdom of Jerusalem circa 1290.

ʿIsa Tarsah Kelemechi (simplified Chinese: 爱薛; pinyin: Àixuē, fl. 1227 – 4 July 1308) was a Church of the East astronomer and physician at the Yuan court of Kublai Khan's Mongol Empire in the 13th century.

== Astrologer in China ==
ʿIsa was named head of the Office of Western Astronomy established by Kublai Khan in 1263 to study Islamic astronomical observations. Kubilai would establish a Observatory for Islamic astronomy in 1271, directed by astronomer Jamal ad-Din Bukhari.

ʿIsa was also instrumental in reinforcing anti-Muslim prohibitions in the Mongol realms, such as prohibiting halal slaughter and circumcision, and, according to Rashid-al-Din Hamadani encouraged denunciation of Muslims. ʿIsa also showed to Khubilai the Sword Verse of the Quran, raising the suspicion of the Mongols towards Muslims. According to Rashid al-Din, as a result, "most Muslims left Khitai [China]".

== Diplomat to Europe ==
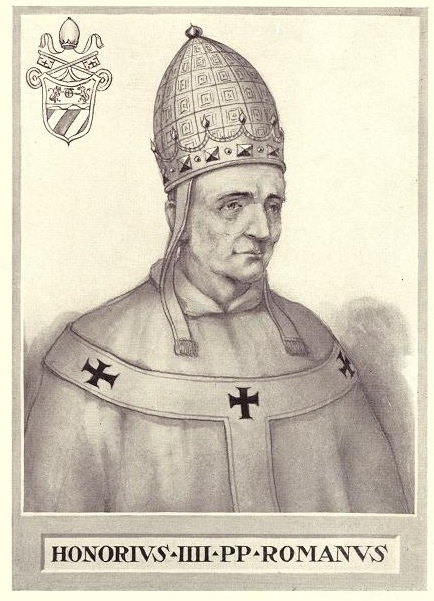
Isa Kelemechi met with Pope Honorius IV in 1285 to propose collaboration against the Mamluk Sultanate.

Isa Kelemechi was later a member of the first mission to Europe sent by Arghun, the Il-Khan in 1285. He met with Pope Honorius IV, remitting a letter from Ghazan offering to "remove" the Saracens and divide "the land of Sham, namely Egypt" with the Franks. The message, written in imperfect Latin, said:

"And now let it be [says the Il-Khan], because the land of the Saracens is not ours, between us, good father, us who are on this side and you who are on your side; the land of Scami [Sham] to wit the land of Egypt between you and us we will crush. We send you the said messengers and [ask] you to send an expedition and army to the land of Egypt, and it shall be now that we from this side shall crush it between us with good men; and that you send us by a good man where you wish the aforesaid done. The Saracens from the midst of us we shall lift and the Lord Pope and the Cam [Great Khan Qubilai] will be lords".

— Message from Arghun to Pope Honorius IV.

The 1285 embassy would be followed in 1287 by that of Rabban bar Sauma.

== See also ==
- Franco-Mongol alliance
