= Syriac Christianity =

Branch of Eastern Christianity

Syriac Christianity (Syriac: ܡܫܝܚܝܘܬܐ ܣܘܪܝܝܬܐ, Mšiḥoyuṯo Suryoyto or Mšiḥāyūṯā Suryāytā) is a branch of Eastern Christianity. The formative body of Syriac literature, covering theological writings and traditional liturgies, are expressed in the Classical Syriac language, a variation of the old Aramaic language. In a wider sense, the term can also refer to Aramaic Christianity in general, thus encompassing all Christian traditions that are based on the liturgical uses of the Aramaic language and its variations, both historical and modern.

Along with Greek and Latin, Classical Syriac was one of the three most important languages of Early Christianity. It became a vessel for the development of a distinctive Syriac form of Christianity which flourished throughout the Near East and other parts of Asia during late antiquity and the early medieval period, giving rise to various liturgical and denominational traditions, represented in modern times by several churches which continue to uphold the religious and cultural heritage of Syriac Christianity.

Syriac Christianity comprises two liturgical traditions: the East Syriac Rite and the West Syriac Rite.

The East Syriac Rite (also known as the Chaldean, Assyrian, or Persian Rite) uses the Liturgy of Addai and Mari. It is the rite of the churches descended from the Church of the East, including the Assyrian Church of the East, the Ancient Church of the East, the Chaldean Syrian Church, and the Chaldean Catholic Church and the Syro-Malabar Catholic Church.

The West Syriac Rite (also called Antiochian Syriac Rite) uses the Liturgy of Saint James. It is the rite of the Oriental Orthodox Syriac Orthodox Church (including its component the Jacobite Syrian Christian Church), Malankara Orthodox Syrian Church, and the Malabar Independent Syrian Church; and the Catholic Maronite Church, the Syriac Catholic Church, and Syro-Malankara Catholic Church. Protestant forms of this rite are used by the Malankara Mar Thoma Syrian Church and the St. Thomas Evangelical Church of India.

In India, indigenous Eastern Christians (Saint Thomas Christians) of both liturgical traditions (East and West Syriac) are called Syrian Christians. The traditional East Syriac community is represented by the Syro-Malabar Catholic Church and the Chaldean Syrian Church of India. The West Syriac liturgical tradition was introduced after 1665, and the community associated with it is represented by the Jacobite Syrian Christian Church (part of the Syriac Orthodox Church) and the Malankara Orthodox Syrian Church, both of which are Oriental Orthodox, in addition to the Syro-Malankara Catholic Church (an Eastern Catholic church), the Malankara Mar Thoma Syrian Church (part of the Anglican Communion), and the Malabar Independent Syrian Church (an independent Oriental Orthodox Church not part of the Oriental Orthodox Communion).

The Syriac language is a variety of Aramaic language that emerged in Edessa, Upper Mesopotamia, during the first centuries AD. It is related to the Aramaic of Jesus, a Galilean dialect. This relationship added to its prestige for Christians. The form of the language in use in Edessa predominated in Christian writings and was accepted as the standard form, "a convenient vehicle for the spread of Christianity wherever there was a substrate of spoken Aramaic". The area where Syriac or Aramaic was spoken, an area of contact and conflict between the Roman Empire and the Sasanian Empire, extended from around Antioch in the west to Seleucia-Ctesiphon, the Sasanian capital in Mesopotamia in the east and comprised the whole or parts of present-day Syria, Lebanon, Israel/Palestine, Iraq, and southeastern parts of Turkey and western parts of Iran, with its speakers being largely Semitic Assyrians, Arameans, Phoenicians, Mandaeans and Judeans.

== Name ==
In modern English, the term "Syriac Christianity" is preferred over the alternative form "Syrian Christianity", that was also commonly used in older literature, as a synonym, particularly during the 19th and the 20th centuries. Since the latter term proved to be very polysemic, a tendency occurred (firstly among scholars) to reduce the term "Syrian Christianity" to its primary (regional) meaning, that designates the Christianity in Syria, while more specific term (Syriac Christianity) came to be used as preferred designation for the entire Syriac branch of Eastern Christianity. That distinction is not yet universally accepted, even among scholars. It is gradually introduced in most of the English speaking world, with some notable exceptions. Churches of Syriac tradition in India still self-identify, in Indian English, as "Syrian" Churches, both for sociolinguistic and legal reasons.

Modern distinctions between "Syrian" and "Syriac" (Christianity) are observed in English language as a partially accepted convention, but such distinctions do not exist in most of the other languages, nor on the endonymic (native) level among adherents of Syriac Christianity. Native terms (ethnonyms, demonyms, glottonyms) that were derived from the name of Syria did not possess a distinctive formal duality that would be equivalent to the conventional English distinction between terms Syrian and Syriac. Since the proposed distinction is not yet universally accepted among scholars, its individual and often inconsistent application has created a complex narrative, that is additionally burdened by older problems, inherited from terminological controversies that originated much earlier, within Syriac studies in particular, and also within Aramaic studies in general.

The use of Syrian/Syriac labels was also challenged by common scholarly reduction of Syriac Christianity to the Eastern Aramaic Christian heritage found among the Assyrian people in what is today Iraq, Southeast Turkey and Northwest Iran, and its offspring. Such reduction was detaching Syriac Christianity from Western Aramaic Christian traditions, that were enrooted in the very homeland of Christianity, encompassing ancient Aramaic-speaking communities in Judea and Palestine, with Galilee and Samaria, and also those in the regions of Nabatea and Palmyrene to the east, and Phoenicia and Syria proper to the north. Since Western Aramaic Christians did not fit into narrow scholarly definition of Syriac Christianity, focused on Eastern Aramaic traditions, various researchers have opted for an additional use of some wider terms, like "Aramaic Christianity", or "Aramaic Christendom", thus designating a religious, cultural and linguistic continuum, encompassing the entire branch of Christianity that stemmed from the first Aramaic-speaking Christian communities, formed in apostolic times, and then continued to develop throughout history, mainly in the Near East and also in several other regions of Asia, including India and China.

In English language, the term Aramaic Christianity should not be confused with term Aramean Christianity, since the first designation is linguistically defined and thus refers to Aramaic-speaking Christians in general, while the second designation is more specific and refers only to Christian Arameans.

== History ==
Present-day Middle-Eastern Syriac Christian denominations

East Syriac (Church of the East) metropolitan sees in Asia from the 9th to the 13th centuries

Christianity began in the Near East, in Jerusalem among Aramaic-speaking Christians (Assyrians). It soon spread to other Aramaic-speaking Semitic peoples like Aramaic pagan peoples along the Eastern Mediterranean coast and also to the inland parts of the Roman Empire and beyond that into the Parthian Empire and the later Sasanian Empire, including Mesopotamia, which was dominated at different times and to varying extents by these empires. Like its Greek and Latin counterparts, the Syriac traditions includes non-ethnic members who wrote in Syriac and were members of the tradition at large, such as Aphraat the Persian.

The ruins of the Dura-Europos church, dating from the first half of the 3rd century are concrete evidence of the presence of organized Christian communities in the Aramaic-speaking area, far from Jerusalem and the Mediterranean coast, and there are traditions of the preaching of Christianity in the region as early as the time of the Apostles.

However, "virtually every aspect of Syriac Christianity prior to the fourth century remains obscure, and it is only then that one can feel oneself on firmer ground". The fourth century is marked by the many writings in Syriac of Saint Ephrem the Syrian, the Demonstrations of the slightly older Aphrahat and the anonymous ascetical Book of Steps. Ephrem lived in the Roman Empire, close to the border with the Sasanian Empire, to which the other two writers belonged. However, another source claims there is a significant amount of evidence from the fourth century and before about liturgical practices.

Early Syriac Christian communities, especially around such as Edessa and Nisibis, retained a strong Judeo-Christian character influenced in part by the Jewish presence in nearby Adiabene. Early Syriac authors like Ephrem and Aphrahat drew upon Jewish exegetical methods and sectarian traditions in their writings, and the Syriac churches remained spiritually close to Jewish practices in their early centuries. They also resisted successive attempts at Hellenization and integration into the Byzantine Empire's forced ecclesiastical and theological framework. This resistance manifested after the Council of Ephesus (431), when the Church of the East asserted its independence from Byzantine authority and reorganised around Nisibis. A similar development occurred after the Council of Chalcedon (451) when the Syriac Orthodox Church established its own hierarchy distinct from that of the imperial church.

Other items of early literature of Syriac Christianity are the Diatessaron of Tatian, the Curetonian Gospels and the Syriac Sinaiticus, the Peshitta Bible and the Doctrine of Addai.

The bishops who took part in the First Council of Nicea (325), the first of the ecumenical councils, included twenty from Syria and one from Persia, outside the Roman Empire. Two councils held in the following century divided Syriac Christianity into two opposing parties.

=== East-West theological contrast ===
West Syriac dioceses of the Syriac Orthodox Church during the medieval period

Syriac Christianity is divided on several theological issues, both Christological and Pneumatological.

In 431, the Council of Ephesus, which is reckoned as the third ecumenical council, condemned Nestorius and Nestorianism. That condemnation was consequently ignored by the East Syriac Church of the East, which had been previously established in the Sasanian Empire as a distinct Church at the Council of Seleucia-Ctesiphon in 410, and which at the Synod of Dadisho in 424 had declared the independence of its head, the Catholicos, in relation to "Western" (Roman Empire) Church authorities. Even in its modern form of Assyrian Church of the East and Ancient Church of the East, it honours Nestorius and his mentors (e.g. Theodore of Mopsuestia) & students (e.g. Ibas of Edessa) as teachers and saints.

In 451, the Council of Chalcedon, the fourth ecumenical council as accepted by the Catholic and Eastern Orthodox Churches, condemned Monophysitism, and also rejected Dyoprosopism. This council was rejected by the Oriental Orthodox Churches (among which is the Syriac Orthodox Church) that use the West Syriac Rite. The Patriarchate of Antioch was consequently divided between two communities: pro-Chalcedonian and non-Chalcedonian. The Chalcedonians were often referred to as "Melkites" by their opponents, derived from the Syriac word "Melka," meaning "royal." This term implied their loyalty to the Byzantine emperor and was used by non-Chalcedonians to suggest that the Melkites prioritized allegiance to the empire over adherence to true teachings. The non-Chalcedonians were dubbed "Monophysites" which means they believed in Christ having a sole, divine nature, despite that not being the actual doctrine of the Oriental Orthodox Churches, which espouse Miaphysitism, the teaching that Christ has one composite nature, fully human and fully divine; they were also called Jacobites (especially, but not exclusively, the Syriac Orthodox Church, particularly in the late Ottoman era) after Jacob Baradaeus.

In 553, the Council of Constantinople, the fifth ecumenical council, anathematized Theodore of Mopsuestia, and also condemned several writings of Theodoret of Cyrus and Ibas of Edessa (see Three-Chapter Controversy). Since those three theologians were highly regarded among Eastern Syriac Christians, further rifts were created, culminating in 612, when a major council of the Church of the East was held in Seleucia-Ctesiphon. Presided by Babai the Great (d. 628), the council officially adopted specific Christological formulations, using Syriac term qnoma (ܩܢܘܡܐ) as designation for dual (divine and human) properties within one prosopon (person) of Christ.

Theological estrangement between East Syriac and West Syriac branches was manifested as a prolonged rivalry, that was particularly intensive between the Church of the East and the Maphrianate of the East (of the Syriac Orthodox Church), with each branch claiming that its doctrines were not heretical while also accusing the other of teaching heresy. Their theological estrangement has persisted through the medieval and early modern periods and into the present era. In 1999, the Coptic Orthodox Church, a sister-church of the Syriac Orthodox Church, blocked admittance of the Assyrian Church of the East to the Middle East Council of Churches, which has among its members the Chaldean Catholic Church, and demanded that it remove from its liturgy the mention of Diodorus of Tarsus, Theodore of Mopsuestia and Nestorius, whom it venerates as "the Greek doctors".

=== East-West liturgical contrast ===
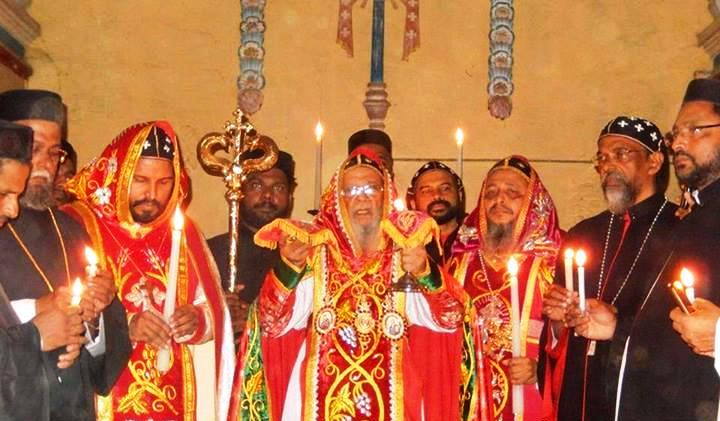
Holy Qurbana of the Syriac Orthodox Church celebration of the Divine Liturgy of Saint James

While not always being the case, the liturgies of the East and West Syriacs are quite distinct nowadays. The East Syriac Rite is noted especially for its eucharistic Qurbana of Addai and Mari, in which the Words of Institution are absent. West Syriacs use the Syro-Antiochian or West Syriac Rite, which belongs to the family of liturgies known as the Antiochene Rite.

The Syriac Orthodox Church adds to the Trisagion ("Holy God, Holy Mighty, Holy Immortal, have mercy on us") the phrase "who were crucified for us". The Church of the East interpreted this as heretical. Patriarch Timothy I of the Church of the East declared: "And also in all the countries of Babylon, of Persia, and of Assyria, and in all the countries of the sunrise, that is to say, among the Indians, the Chinese, the Tibetans, the Turks, and in all the provinces under the jurisdiction of this Patriarchal See, there is no addition of Crucifixus es pro nobis".

Among the Saint Thomas Christians of India, the East Syriac Rite was the one originally used, but those who in the 17th century accepted union with the Syriac Orthodox Church adopted the West Syriac Rite of that church.

=== Further divisions ===
Present-day divisions of Saint Thomas Christians (also known as Syrian Christians)

A schism in 1552 in the Church of the East gave rise to a separate patriarchate, which at first entered into union with the Catholic Church but later formed the nucleus of the present-day Assyrian Church of the East and Ancient Church of the East, while at the end of the 18th century most followers of the earlier patriarchate chose union with Rome and, with some others, now form the Chaldean Catholic Church.

In India, all of the Saint Thomas Christians are still collectively called "Syrian Christians". The majority of the Saint Thomas Christians, who initially depended on the Church of the East, maintained union with Rome in spite of discomforts felt at Latinization by their Portuguese rulers and clergy, against which they protested. They now form the Syro-Malabar Catholic Church. A small group, which split from these in the early 19th century, united at the beginning of the 20th century, under the name of Chaldean Syrian Church, with the Assyrian Church of the East.

Those who in 1653 broke with the Catholic Church as dominated by the Portuguese in India and soon chose union with the Syriac Orthodox Church later split into various groups. The first separation was that of the Malabar Independent Syrian Church in 1772. At the end of the 19th century, the Malankara Marthoma Syrian Church separated, after which they adopted a Reformed variant of the Liturgy of St. James and later in the course of the 20th century, a division arose among those who remained united with the Syriac Orthodox Church who insisted on full autocephaly and are now called the Malankara Orthodox Syrian Church and those, the Jacobite Syrian Christian Church, who remain faithful to the patriarch.

A reunion movement led in 1930 to the establishment of full communion between some of the Malankara Syrian Orthodox and the Catholic Church. They now form the Syro-Malankara Catholic Church.

In the Middle East, the newly enthroned patriarch of the Syriac Orthodox Church, Ignatius Michael III Jarweh, declared himself a Catholic and, having received confirmation from Rome in 1783, became the head of the Syriac Catholic Church.

In the 19th and 20th centuries, as persecution peaked especially after the Assyrian genocide, many Syriac Christians, both East and West, left the Middle East for other lands, creating a substantial diaspora.

In modern times, several Churches of Syriac tradition are actively participating in ecumenical dialogue.

== Terms for Syriac Christians ==
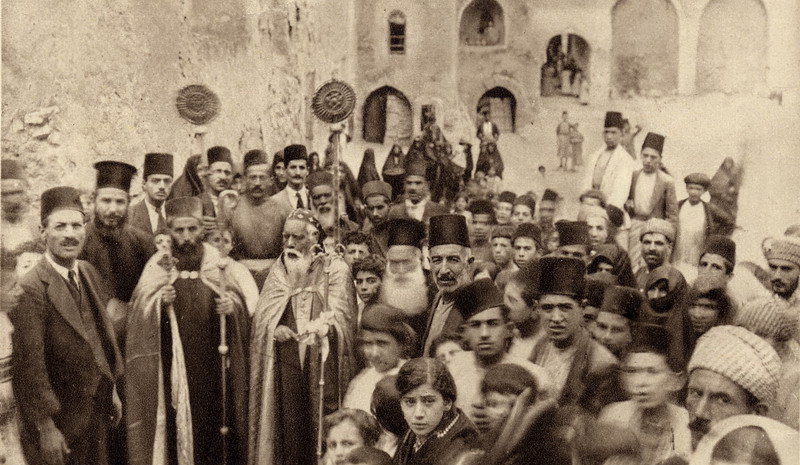
Celebration at a Syriac Orthodox monastery in Mosul, Ottoman Syria (now Iraq), early 20th century

Indigenous Aramaic-speaking communities of the Near East (Syriac: ܣܘܪܝܝܐ) adopted Christianity very early, perhaps already from the first century, and began to abandon their three-millennia-old traditional ancient Mesopotamian religion, although this religion did not fully die out until as late as the tenth century. The kingdom of Osroene, with the capital city of Edessa, was absorbed into the Roman Empire in 114 as a semi-autonomous vassal state and then, after a period under the supremacy of the Parthian Empire, was incorporated as a Roman province, first in 214, and finally in 242.

In 431 the Council of Ephesus declared Nestorianism a heresy. Nestorians, persecuted in the Byzantine Empire, sought refuge in the parts of Mesopotamia that were part of the Sasanian Empire. This encouraged acceptance of Nestorian doctrine by the Persian Church of the East, which spread Christianity outside Persia, to India, China, Tibet and Mongolia, expanding the range of this eastern branch of Syriac Christianity. Most of the remaining Syriac Christians within the Byzantine Empire formally accepted Miaphysitism having rejected the Council of Chalcedon, and also spread their faith eastwards Persia, India, and China.

== Churches of Syriac traditions ==
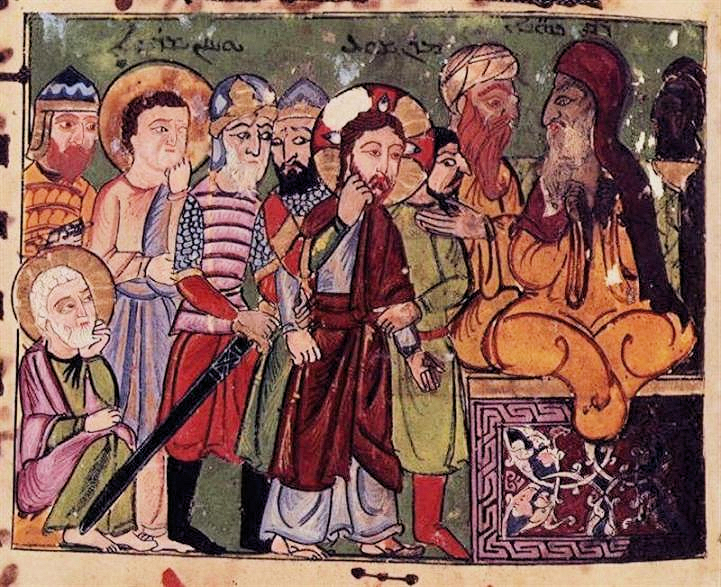
Syriac gospel miniature from Zengid dynasty Mosul, Iraq, c. 1216–1220.

West Syriac Rite

- Oriental Orthodox
  - Syriac Orthodox Church (Syriac Orthodox Patriarchate of Antioch and all the East, based in Damascus, Syria)
    - Jacobite Syrian Christian Church (Syriac Orthodox Church in India, Catholicosate, based in Kochi, Kerala, India)
  - Malankara Orthodox Syrian Church (Indian Orthodox Church, Catholicosate, based in Kottayam, Kerala, India)
  - Malabar Independent Syrian Church (Independent Oriental Orthodox Church, based in Thozhiyur, Kerala, India, not part of the Oriental Orthodox Communion)
- Eastern Catholic Churches of the West Syriac Rite
  - Maronite Catholic Church (Syriac Maronite Patriarchate of Antioch and all the East, based in Bkerké, Lebanon)
  - Syriac Catholic Church (Syriac Catholic Patriarchate of Antioch and all the East, based in Beirut, Lebanon)
  - Syro-Malankara Catholic Church (Malankara Syrian Catholic Church, Catholicosate, based in Trivandrum, Kerala, India)
- Eastern Protestant Churches
  - Malankara Mar Thoma Syrian Church (in full communion with the Anglican Communion, based in Thiruvalla, Kerala, India)
  - St. Thomas Evangelical Church of India (based in Thiruvalla, Kerala, India)

East Syriac Rite

- Church of the East
  - The Assyrian Church of the East, traditionalist continuation that emerged from the Shimun line of patriarchs of the Church of the East that took this name in 1976
    - The Chaldean Syrian Church, an archbishopric in India of the Assyrian Church of the East
  - The Ancient Church of the East, split from the Assyrian Church of the East in the 1960s.
- Eastern Catholic Churches of the East Syriac Rite
  - The Chaldean Catholic Church, an Eastern Catholic Church that emerged from the Elia line of patriarchs of the Church of the East following splits in 1552, 1667/1668 and 1779
  - The Syro-Malabar Church, an Eastern Catholic Church based in Kerala that is independent from the Chaldean Catholic hierarchy since the Synod of Diamper in 1599.

East Syriac Christians were involved in the mission to India, and many of the present Churches in India are in communion with either East or West Syriac Churches. These Indian Christians are known as Saint Thomas Christians.

In modern times, even apart from the Eastern Protestant denominations like Mar Thoma Syrian Church of Malabar and St. Thomas Evangelical Church of India, which originated from Churches of the West Syriac Rite, various Evangelical denominations continue to send representatives among Syriac Christians. As a result, several Evangelical groups have been established, particularly the Assyrian Pentecostal Church (mostly in America, Iran, and Iraq) from East Syriac Christians, and the Aramean Free Church (mostly in Germany, Sweden, America and Syria) from West Syriac Christians. Because of their new (Protestant) theology these are oftentimes not classified as traditional churches of Syriac Christianity.

== See also ==
- Assyrian people
- Saint Thomas Christian denominations
- Assyrian genocide
- Christianity in Turkey

== General and cited sources ==
- Abouzayd, Shafiq (2019). "The Maronite Church". The Syriac World. London: Routledge. pp. 731–750. ISBN 9781138899018.
- Andrade, Nathanael J. (2019). "Syriac and Syrians in the Later Roman Empire: Questions of Identity". The Syriac World. London: Routledge. pp. 157–174. ISBN 9781138899018.
- Aufrecht, Walter E. (2001). "A Legacy of Syria: The Aramaic Language". Bulletin of the Canadian Society for Mesopotamian Studies. 36: 145–155.
- Bar-Asher Siegal, Michal (2019). "Judaism and Syriac Christianity". The Syriac World. London: Routledge. pp. 146–156.
- Baum, Wilhelm; Winkler, Dietmar W. (2003). The Church of the East: A Concise History. London-New York: Routledge-Curzon. ISBN 9781134430192.
- Baumer, Christoph (2006). The Church of the East: An Illustrated History of Assyrian Christianity. London-New York: Tauris. ISBN 9781845111151.
- Brock, Sebastian P. (1982). "Christians in the Sasanian Empire: A Case of Divided Loyalties". Studies in Church History. 18: 1–19. doi:10.1017/S0424208400016004. ISBN 9780631180609. S2CID 163971637.
- Brock, Sebastian P. (1992). Studies in Syriac Christianity: History, Literature, and Theology. Aldershot: Variorum. ISBN 9780860783053.
- Brock, Sebastian P. (1992). "Eusebius and Syriac Christianity". Eusebius, Christianity, and Judaism. Detroit: Wayne State University Press. pp. 212–234. ISBN 0814323618.
- Brock, Sebastian P. (1997). A Brief Outline of Syriac Literature. Kottayam: St. Ephrem Ecumenical Research Institute. ISBN 978-1-61143-563-4.
- Brock, Sebastian P. (1998). "Syriac Culture, 337–425". The Cambridge Ancient History. Vol. 13. Cambridge: Cambridge University Press. pp. 708–719. ISBN 9780521302005.
- Brock, Sebastian P. (1999a). From Ephrem to Romanos: Interactions Between Syriac and Greek in Late Antiquity. Aldershot: Ashgate. ISBN 9780860788003.
- Brock, Sebastian P. (1999b). "St. Ephrem in the Eyes of Later Syriac Liturgical Tradition" (PDF). Hugoye: Journal of Syriac Studies. 2 (1): 5–25. doi:10.31826/hug-2010-020103. S2CID 212688898.
- Brock, Sebastian P. (1999c). "Eusebius and Syriac Christianity". Doctrinal Diversity: Varieties of Early Christianity. New York and London: Garland Publishing. pp. 258–280. ISBN 9780815330714.
- Brock, Sebastian P. (1999d). "The Christology of the Church of the East in the Synods of the Fifth to Early Seventh Centuries: Preliminary Considerations and Materials". Doctrinal Diversity: Varieties of Early Christianity. New York and London: Garland Publishing. pp. 281–298. ISBN 9780815330714.
- Brock, Sebastian P. (1999e). "The Importance of the Syriac Traditions in Ecumenical Dialogue on Christology". Christian Orient. 20: 189–197.
- Brock, Sebastian P. (2004a). "Ephrem and the Syriac Tradition". The Cambridge History of Early Christian Literature. Cambridge: Cambridge University Press. pp. 362–372. ISBN 9780521460835.
- Brock, Sebastian P. (2004b). "The Syriac Churches in Ecumenical Dialogue on Christology". Eastern Christianity: Studies in Modern History, Religion and Politics. London: Melisende. pp. 44–65. ISBN 9781901764239.
- Brock, Sebastian P. (2005). "The Syriac Orient: A Third 'Lung' for the Church?". Orientalia Christiana Periodica. 71: 5–20.
- Brock, Sebastian P. (2006). Fire from Heaven: Studies in Syriac Theology and Liturgy. Aldershot: Ashgate. ISBN 9780754659082.
- Brown, Leslie W. (1956). The Indian Christians of St Thomas: An Account of the Ancient Syrian Church of Malabar. Cambridge: Cambridge University Press.
- Burnett, Stephen G. (2005). "Christian Aramaism: The Birth and Growth of Aramaic Scholarship in the Sixteenth Century" (PDF). Seeking Out the Wisdom of the Ancients. Winona Lake: Eisenbrauns. pp. 421–436. Archived from the original (PDF) on 2021-08-27.
- Chabot, Jean-Baptiste (1902). Synodicon orientale ou recueil de synodes nestoriens (PDF). Paris: Imprimerie Nationale.
- Chaillot, Christine (1998). The Syrian Orthodox Church of Antioch and All the East: A Brief Introduction to Its Life and Spirituality. Geneva: Inter-Orthodox dialogue.
- Daryaee, Touraj (2019). "The Sasanian Empire". The Syriac World. London: Routledge. pp. 33–43. ISBN 9781138899018.
- Debié, Muriel (2009). "Syriac Historiography and Identity Formation". Church History and Religious Culture. 89 (1–3): 93–114. doi:10.1163/187124109X408014.
- Dickens, Mark (2019). "Syriac Christianity in Central Asia". The Syriac World. London: Routledge. pp. 583–624. ISBN 9781138899018.
- Donabed, Sargon G.; Mako, Shamiran (2009). "Ethno-cultural and Religious Identity of Syrian Orthodox Christians" (PDF). Chronos: Revue d'Histoire de l'Université de Balamand. 19: 69–111.
- Donabed, Sargon G. (2015). Reforging a Forgotten History: Iraq and the Assyrians in the Twentieth Century. Edinburgh: Edinburgh University Press. ISBN 9780748686056.
- Fiey, Jean Maurice (1979) [1963]. Communautés syriaques en Iran et Irak des origines à 1552. London: Variorum Reprints. ISBN 9780860780519.
- Griffith, Sidney H. (1986). "Ephraem, the Deacon of Edessa, and the Church of the Empire". Diakonia: Studies in Honor of Robert T. Meyer. Washington: CUA Press. pp. 25–52. ISBN 9780813205960.
- Griffith, Sidney H. (2002). "Christianity in Edessa and the Syriac-Speaking World: Mani, Bar Daysan, and Ephraem, the Struggle for Allegiance on the Aramean Frontier". Journal of the Canadian Society for Syriac Studies. 2: 5–20. doi:10.31826/jcsss-2009-020104. S2CID 212688584. Archived from the original on 2019-09-10.
- Grillmeier, Aloys; Hainthaler, Theresia (2013). Christ in Christian Tradition: The Churches of Jerusalem and Antioch from 451 to 600. Vol. 2/3. Oxford: Oxford University Press. ISBN 9780199212880.
- Haar Romeny, Bas ter (2012). "Ethnicity, Ethnogenesis and the Identity of Syriac Orthodox Christians". Visions of Community in the Post-Roman World: The West, Byzantium and the Islamic World, 300–1100. Farnham: Ashgate Publishing. pp. 183–204. ISBN 9781317001362.
- Hainthaler, Theresia (2019). "Theological Doctrines and Debates within Syriac Christianity". The Syriac World. London: Routledge. pp. 377–390. ISBN 9781138899018.
- Harvey, Susan A. (2019). "Women and Children in Syriac Christianity: Sounding Voices". The Syriac World. London: Routledge. pp. 554–566. ISBN 9781138899018.
- Healey, John F. (2014). "Aramaean Heritage". The Aramaeans in Ancient Syria. Leiden: Brill. pp. 391–402. ISBN 9789004229433.
- Healey, John F. (2019a). "Arameans and Aramaic in Transition – Western Influences and the Roots of Aramean Christianity". Research on Israel and Aram: Autonomy, Independence and Related Issues. Tübingen: Mohr Siebeck. pp. 433–446. ISBN 9783161577192.
- Healey, John F. (2019b). "The Pre-Christian Religions of the Syriac-Speaking Regions". The Syriac World. London: Routledge. pp. 47–67. ISBN 9781138899018.
- Herman, Geoffrey (2019). "The Syriac World in the Persian Empire". The Syriac World. London: Routledge. pp. 134–145. doi:10.4324/9781315708195-9. ISBN 978-1-315-70819-5.
- Hovorun, Cyril (2008). Will, Action and Freedom: Christological Controversies in the Seventh Century. Leiden-Boston: Brill. ISBN 9781138899018.
- Hunter, Erica C. D. (2019). "Changing Demography: Christians in Iraq since 1991". The Syriac World. London: Routledge. pp. 783–796. ISBN 9781138899018.
- Jakob, Joachim (2014). Ostsyrische Christen und Kurden im Osmanischen Reich des 19. und frühen 20. Jahrhunderts. Münster: LIT Verlag. ISBN 9783643506160.
- Jobling, William J. (1996). "New Evidence for the History of Indigenous Aramaic Christianity in Southern Jordan". Sydney Studies in Society and Culture. 12: 62–73.
- Jullien, Florence (2019). "Forms of the Religious Life and Syriac Monasticism". The Syriac World. London: Routledge. pp. 88–104. ISBN 9781138899018.
- Karim, Cyril Aphrem (2004). Symbols of the Cross in the Writings of the Early Syriac Fathers. Piscataway: Gorgias Press. ISBN 9781593332303.
- Kitchen, Robert A. (2012). "The Syriac Tradition". The Orthodox Christian World. London-New York: Routledge. pp. 66–77. ISBN 9781136314841.
- Khoury, Widad (2019). "Churches in Syriac Space: Architectural and Liturgical Context and Development". The Syriac World. London: Routledge. pp. 476–553. ISBN 9781138899018.
- Loopstra, Jonathan A. (2019). "The Syriac Bible and its Interpretation". The Syriac World. London: Routledge. pp. 293–308. ISBN 9781138899018.
- Loosley, Emma (2010). "Peter, Paul and James of Jerusalem: The Doctrinal and Political Evolution of the Eastern and Oriental Churches". Eastern Christianity in the Modern Middle East. London-New York: Routledge. pp. 1–12. ISBN 9781135193713.
- Loosley, Emma (2019). "The Material Culture of the Syrian Peoples in Late Antiquity and the Evidence for Syrian Wall Paintings". The Syriac World. London: Routledge. pp. 460–475. ISBN 9781138899018.
- Menze, Volker L. (2019). "The Establishment of the Syriac Churches". The Syriac World. London: Routledge. pp. 105–118. ISBN 9781138899018.
- Meyendorff, John (1989). Imperial unity and Christian divisions: The Church 450–680 A.D. Crestwood, NY: St. Vladimir's Seminary Press. ISBN 9780881410563.
- Michelson, David Allen. (2022).The Library of Paradise: a History of Contemplative Reading in the Monasteries of the Church of the East. Oxford University Press.
- Millar, Fergus (2006). A Greek Roman Empire: Power and Belief under Theodosius II (408–450). Berkeley: University of California Press. ISBN 9780520253919.
- Millar, Fergus (2013). "The Evolution of the Syrian Orthodox Church in the Pre-Islamic Period: From Greek to Syriac?" (PDF). Journal of Early Christian Studies. 21 (1): 43–92. doi:10.1353/earl.2013.0002. S2CID 170436440.
- Mingana, Alphonse (1926). "The Early Spread of Christianity in India" (PDF). Bulletin of the John Rylands Library. 10 (2): 435–514. doi:10.7227/BJRL.10.2.7.
- Montgomery, Robert L. (2002). The Lopsided Spread of Christianity: Toward an Understanding of the Diffusion of Religions. Westport: Praeger Publishers. ISBN 9780275973612.
- Murre van den Berg, Heleen (2007). "Syriac Christianity". The Blackwell Companion to Eastern Christianity. Malden: Blackwell. pp. 249–268. ISBN 9780470766392.
- Murre van den Berg, Heleen (2008). "Classical Syriac, Neo-Aramaic, and Arabic in the Church of the East and the Chaldean Church between 1500 and 1800". Aramaic in Its Historical and Linguistic Setting. Wiesbaden: Harrassowitz Verlag. pp. 335–352. ISBN 9783447057875.
- Murre van den Berg, Heleen (2015). "Classical Syriac and the Syriac Churches: A Twentieth-Century History". Syriac Encounters: Papers from the Sixth North American Syriac Symposium. Louvain: Peeters Publishers. pp. 119–148. ISBN 9789042930469.
- Murre-van den Berg, Heleen (2019). "Syriac Identity in the Modern Era". The Syriac World. London: Routledge. pp. 770–782. ISBN 9781138899018.
- Nichols, Aidan (2010) [1992]. Rome and the Eastern Churches: A Study in Schism (2nd revised ed.). San Francisco: Ignatius Press. ISBN 9781586172824.
- O'Mahony, Anthony (2006). "Syriac Christianity in the modern Middle East". The Cambridge History of Christianity: Eastern Christianity. Vol. 5. Cambridge: Cambridge University Press. pp. 511–536. ISBN 9780521811132.
- Penn, Michael Philip (2019). "Early Syriac Reactions to the Rise of Islam". The Syriac World. London: Routledge. pp. 175–188. ISBN 9781138899018.
- Perczel, István (2019). "Syriac Christianity in India". The Syriac World. London: Routledge. pp. 653–697. ISBN 9781138899018.
- Possekel, Ute (2019). "The Emergence of Syriac Literature to AD 400". The Syriac World. London: Routledge. pp. 309–326. ISBN 9781138899018.
- Quispel, Gilles (2008). Gnostica, Judaica, Catholica: Collected Essays of Gilles Quispel. Leiden-Boston: Brill. ISBN 9789047441823.
- Robinson, Theodore H.; Coakley, James F. (2013) [1915]. Robinson's Paradigms and Exercises in Syriac Grammar (6th revised ed.). Oxford: Oxford University Press. ISBN 9780199687176.
- Rompay, Lucas van (2008). "The East: Syria and Mesopotamia". The Oxford Handbook of Early Christian Studies. Oxford: Oxford University Press. pp. 365–386. ISBN 9780199271566.
- Ross, Steven K. (2001). Roman Edessa: Politics and Culture on the Eastern Fringes of the Roman Empire, 114–242 CE. London-New York: Routledge. ISBN 9781134660636.
- Saint-Laurent, Jeanne-Nicole (2019). "Syriac Hagiographic Literature". The Syriac World. London: Routledge. pp. 339–354. ISBN 9781138899018.
- Seleznyov, Nikolai N. (2008). "The Church of the East & Its Theology: History of Studies". Orientalia Christiana Periodica. 74 (1): 115–131.
- Seleznyov, Nikolai N. (2010). "Nestorius of Constantinople: Condemnation, Suppression, Veneration: With special reference to the role of his name in East-Syriac Christianity". Journal of Eastern Christian Studies. 62 (3–4): 165–190.
- Seleznyov, Nikolai N. (2013). "Jacobs and Jacobites: The Syrian Origins of the Name and its Egyptian Arabic Interpretations". Scrinium: Journal of Patrology, Critical Hagiographyand Ecclesiastical History. 9: 382–398.
- Simmons, Ernest (1959). The Fathers and Doctors of the Church. Milwaukee: Bruce Publishing Company.
- Takahashi, Hidemi (2019). "Syriac Christianity in China". The Syriac World. London: Routledge. pp. 625–652. ISBN 9781138899018.
- Taylor, David G. K. (2019). "The Coming of Christianity to Mesopotamia". The Syriac World. London: Routledge. pp. 68–87. ISBN 9781138899018.
- Teule, Herman (2007). "Current Trends in Syriac Studies". Eastern Crossroads: Essays on Medieval Christian Legacy. Piscataway, NJ: Gorgias Press. pp. 387–400. doi:10.31826/9781463212827-024. ISBN 9781463212827.
- Varghese, Baby (2019). "The Liturgies of the Syriac Churches". The Syriac World. London: Routledge. pp. 391–404. ISBN 9781138899018.
- Weltecke, Dorothea; Younansardaroud, Helen (2019). "The Renaissance of Syriac Literature in the Twelfth–Thirteenth Centuries". The Syriac World. London: Routledge. pp. 698–717. ISBN 9781138899018.
- Watt, John W. (2019). "Syriac Philosophy". The Syriac World. London: Routledge. pp. 422–437. ISBN 9781138899018.
- Wilmshurst, David (2019). "The Church of the East in the 'Abbasid Era". The Syriac World. London: Routledge. pp. 189–201. doi:10.4324/9781315708195-15.
- Winkler, Dietmar W. (2019). "The Syriac Church Denominations: An Overview". The Syriac World. London: Routledge. pp. 119–133. ISBN 9781138899018.
- Wood, Philip (2019). "Historiography in the Syriac-Speaking World, 300–1000". The Syriac World. London: Routledge. pp. 405–421. ISBN 9781138899018.
