= Giwargis Warda =

Giwargis Warda (Note: also spelled Givargis or Gewargis) (Classical Syriac: ܓܝܘܪܓܝܣ ܘܪܕܐ, Giwargis being the equivalent of "George" and warda meaning "rose") was a Syriac poet of the Church of the East who probably lived in the 13th century. He is named in several manuscripts as the author (or perhaps compiler) of The Book of the Rose (Classical Syriac: ܟܬܒܐ ܕܘܪܕܐ, romanized: Kṯāḇā d-Wardā), an anthology of Syriac hymns for various liturgical festivals. Not all of the poems contained in this anthology are authored by him, but establishing the authenticity of the poems is difficult given the high degree of variation between manuscripts. Only 34 out of 150 poems attributed to him have been published so far.

Nothing of Giwargis's life or dates can be stated with confidence. According to one manuscript, Giwargis was originally from Arbela. This may be owing to confusion with the 10th-century author Giwargis of Arbela, but there is one poem in the collection that inveigles against a faithless deacon from the vicinity of Arbela. Several of the Wardā hymns are commemorative of historical events. One concerns a famine that struck northern Mesopotamia in 1223. One poem addresses the Mongol raids that plagued the region in 1235–1236. Giwargis may have been contemporary with these events, but this is not certain. One hymn attributed to Giwargis mentions the Patriarch Timothy II (r. 1318–1332) and so must have been written a century later. That Giwargis is not listed in the catalogue of Syriac authors in the Paradise of Eden of ʿAbdishoʿ bar Brikha (completed after 1315) also suggests that he lived in the 14th century.

Giwargis was a significant poet of the Syriac renaissance of the 12th and 13th centuries and a number of his poems were incorporated into the liturgy of the Church of the East.
