= Hymns on Paradise =

Cycle of hymns by Ephrem the Syrian

The Hymns on Paradise are a collection of fifteen Syriac hymns (madrashe) attributed to Ephrem the Syrian (d. 373). The work is a poetic and theological meditation on the biblical paradise narrative of Genesis 2–3, the fall of Adam and Eve, the Tree of life, the Tree of the knowledge of good and evil, the redemption of humanity through Christ, and the eschatological Paradise expected after the resurrection.

The hymns are among Ephrem's most important poetic works and illustrate his characteristic method of biblical interpretation: Ephrem reads the account of Paradise not only through methods including symbol, paradox, and typology.

In Quranic studies, the Hymns of Ephrem have been noted for their profound similarity to the account of Paradise in the Quran as early as the late nineteenth century.

== Background ==
Ephrem was active first in Nisibis and later in Edessa, both located in modern-day Turkey but then in the historical region of late antique Syria. Ephrem's movement to Edessa was forced, caused by the acquisition of Nisibis by the Sasanian Empire in 363 AD. Throughout his life, he wrote hundreds of works, both prose and poetry. His poetry used many syllabic patterns, and in part through his influence, poetry became one of the major vehicles of expression of theology in Syriac literature.

== Content ==
The first hymn begins from Moses' account of the Garden and presents Scripture as a "treasure house of revelations". Ephrem places himself between awe and love: love draws him toward contemplation of Paradise, while awe restrains him from presuming to comprehend it fully. The hymn also places Paradise above the fallen world and uses the parable of Lazarus and the rich man to describe its relationship to the righteous and the wicked.

Several hymns describe Paradise as a mountain or ordered space with different levels. The worthy receive places suited to their spiritual condition, while the entrance to Paradise functions as a form of judgment. Ephrem also depicts the Tree of Life at the summit of Paradise and the Tree of Knowledge as a boundary before the inner sanctuary, comparing Eden to the sanctuary and Holy of Holies in the biblical tabernacle.

The eighth hymn reflects on the "good thief" of Luke 23:43 and the problem of how a soul could be in Paradise before the resurrection. Ephrem argues that the soul does not enter Paradise without the body; instead, the souls of the righteous await the resurrection near the boundary of Paradise, when body and soul will enter together.

Later hymns turn to the joys of Paradise, its fragrance, trees, air, light, and healing power. Ephrem repeatedly warns that such descriptions are metaphorical: Paradise belongs to another mode of existence and can be described only through the names and images of visible things. In Hymn 11, for example, he explains that Paradise "has simply clothed itself" in familiar terms because human nature is too weak to perceive its greatness directly.

== Themes ==
The hymns are shaped by Ephrem's theology of symbols. Visible things disclose hidden realities, but they do so indirectly and must not be reduced to literal description. Paradise is therefore both the Garden of Genesis and a symbol of the restored creation, the Church, the resurrection, and communion with God.

Adam's fall and restoration are central to the cycle. Ephrem presents the Tree of Knowledge not simply as a trap but as a test of freedom, a boundary protecting the inner glory of Paradise. Had Adam obeyed, he would have been robed in glory and granted knowledge rightly; through disobedience he gained knowledge only as shame and loss.

The "robe of glory" is one of the work's most important images. In Ephrem's symbolic theology, Adam and Eve lost their primordial garment through the fall, while Christ restores it through the incarnation, baptism, and resurrection. Brock connects this imagery with a wider Syriac pattern in which salvation history is described through clothing: humanity loses the robe of glory in Paradise and receives it again through Christ.

The hymns also emphasize resurrection. Paradise is not merely the destination of disembodied souls, but the perfected realm into which the righteous enter as whole persons after body and soul are reunited. This concern reflects Ephrem's broader opposition to any view of salvation that would make the body irrelevant.

== Text and translations ==
The critical modern edition of the original Syriac work was published by Edmund Beck in the Corpus Scriptorum Christianorum Orientalium series. An English translation was published by Sebastian Brock in 1990.
