= Book of Steps =

The Book of Steps (Syriac: ܟܬܒܐ ܕܡܣ̈ܩܬܐ, Kṯāḇâ ḏ-Masqāṯâ; also known by the Latin name Liber Graduum) is an anonymous treatise and a work of Christian Syriac literature, probably written in the late fourth century AD (or possibly early fifth century). The author appears to be living in the Sasanian Empire, perhaps somewhere near the Lesser Zab, as it is mentioned in Memra Thirty, and addresses the author's own Christian community.

== Summary ==
The Book of Steps is divided into thirty chapters, or discourses (ܡܐܡ̈ܖܐ, mêmrê). The first discourse, and subsequent ones (especially number 14), divides the community into two groups. One group is called the perfect (ܓܡܝ̈ܖܐ, gmîrê), to whom the stricter major commandments apply. The other group is called the upright (ܟܐ̈ܢܐ, kênê), who seem to comprise the remainder of the community, to whom only lesser commandments (which are described as spiritual milk to the solid food of the major commandments — Hebrews 5.13–14) apply. The lesser commandments are outworkings of the Golden Rule (Matthew 7.12 and Luke 6.31), and represent a life devoted to charity. On the other hand, the 'perfect' are expected to renounce family, marriage and property so as to receive baptism of fire and Spirit.

This division of the community echoes a similar division in Manichaeism. The teaching of the Book of Steps has been described as Messalian by some scholars (including Kmoskó the editor of the critical Syriac edition). However, Brock has demonstrated that the Book of Steps' emphasis on the structure of the visible church (particularly strong in discourse 12) shows that its doctrine is quite removed from Messalianism. An English translation of the entirety of the Book of Steps by Kitchen and Parmentier has recently been published.

The headings of the thirty chapters, or discourses, are as follows:

1. On the distinction between the major commandments, for the perfect, and the minor commandments, for the upright.
2. On those who wish to be perfect.
3. The physical and the spiritual ministry.
4. On vegetables for the sick (see Romans 14.2).
5. On milk for infants (see I Corinthians 3.1–2).
6. On the person who becomes perfect and continues to grow.
7. On the commandments for the upright.
8. On the person who gives all he has to the poor to eat.
9. On uprightness and on the love of the upright and of prophets.
10. On the advantage we have when we endure evil while performing good; and on fasting and humiliation of body and soul.
11. On hearing the Scriptures, and when the Law is read before us.
12. On the ministry of the hidden and the revealed church (English trans. in Murray. Symbols. and Brock (1988). Syriac Fathers.).
13. On the way of life of the upright.
14. On the upright and the perfect.
15. On the marriage instinct in Adam.
16. On how a person grows as a result of the major commandments.
17. On the sufferings of our Lord, by which an example is provided for us.
18. On the tears of prayer (English trans. in Brock (1988). Syriac Fathers.).
19. On the distinguishing characteristics of the way of perfection.
20. On the hard steps on the way.
21. On the Tree of Adam.
22. On the judgments by which those who make them are not saved.
23. On Satan, Pharaoh and the Children of Israel.
24. On repentance.
25. On the voice of God and that of Satan.
26. On the second law which the Lord laid down for Adam.
27. On the matter of the thief who was saved.
28. On the human soul not being blood.
29. On subduing the body.
30. On the commandments of faith and of love of the solitaries.
