= Syriac literature =

Literature in the Syriac language

Syriac literature is the body of writing in Syriac, a literary dialect of Aramaic that developed around Edessa in northern Mesopotamia. In its narrower sense, the term refers to literature in Classical Syriac, the learned and liturgical language of several eastern Christian traditions. In a broader sense, it can also include modern writing in Neo-Aramaic varieties associated with Syriac Christian communities. Syriac literature is especially associated with Syriac Christianity, but it was shaped by contact with Greek, Jewish, Mesopotamian, Iranian, Arabic, Armenian, and other literary cultures. Among its greatest authors include Ephrem the Syrian, Aphrahat, Jacob of Serugh, Narsai, and Barhebraeus.

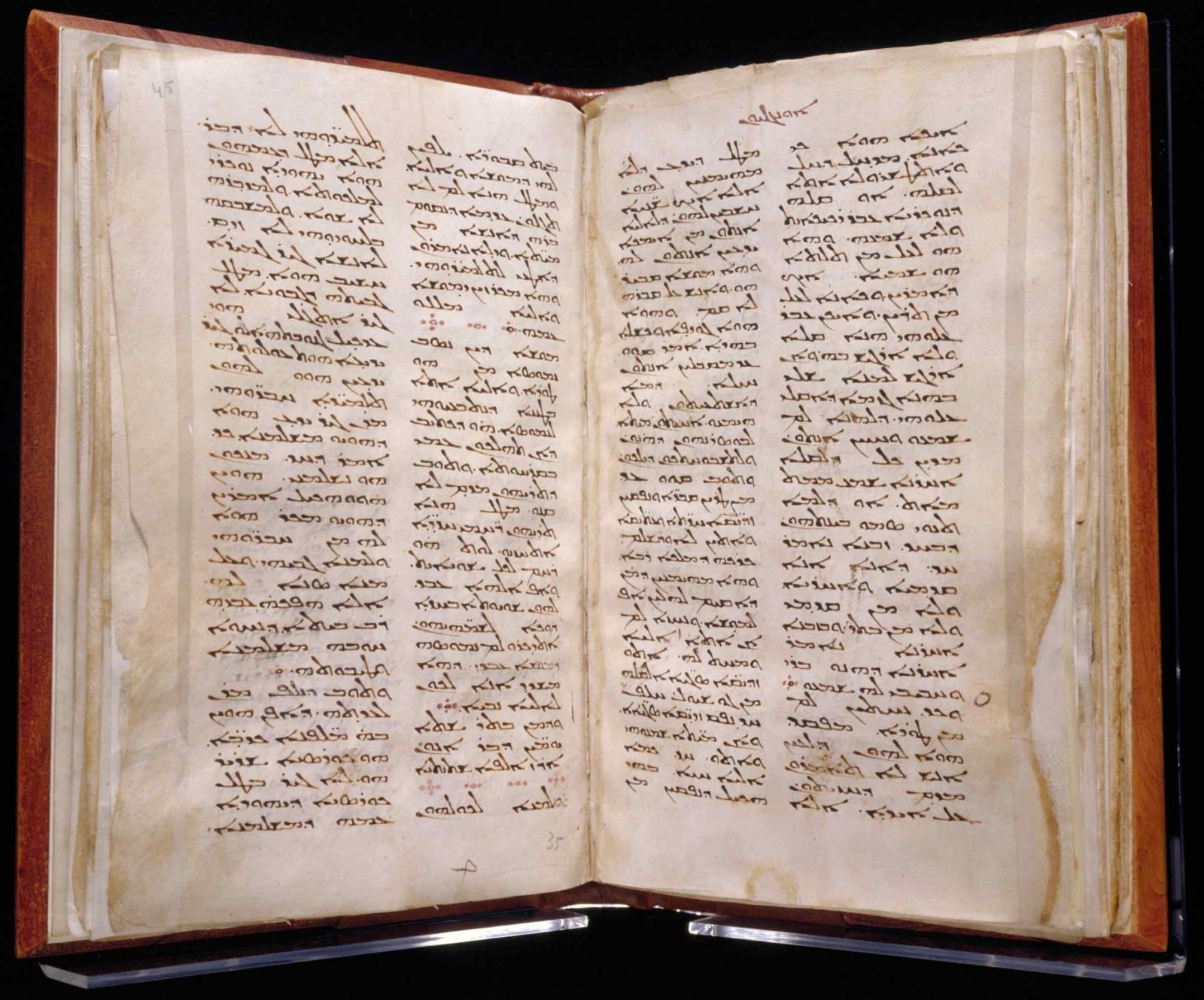
A late fifth- or early sixth-century Syriac manuscript of Ephrem's Commentary on the Diatessaron, written in Estrangela script.

The surviving corpus includes biblical translations, hymns, verse homilies, prose commentaries, hagiography, apocrypha, apocalypse, historiography, theology, canon law, grammar, philosophy, medicine, and scientific translation. It flourished from the "Syriac Golden Age" in late antiquity, through the medieval period in the Byzantine, Sasanian, and Islamic Near East. A massive revival of this literature in the eleventh to thirteenth centuries is known as the Syriac Renaissance. Syriac literature continues to be used today as a liturgical and literary language among the Church of the East, the Syriac Orthodox Church, the Maronite Church, the Syriac Catholic Church, the Chaldean Catholic Church, and the Saint Thomas Christians of India.

== Terminology and scope ==
"Syriac" originally designated the Aramaic dialect of Edessa, called Urhay in Syriac. The dialect is attested in inscriptions from the early first century AD and became a Christian literary language through the prestige of Edessa and its traditions about King Abgar V and the apostle Addai of Edessa. By the fourth century a relatively stable Classical Syriac had emerged, and this language remained the main medium of Syriac learned and liturgical writing for centuries.

The term "Syriac literature" is therefore not exactly equivalent to the literature of one state, ethnicity, or church. Syriac was never the official language of a single empire, and its writers belonged to communities spread across the Roman and Sasanian empires and, later, the Islamic caliphates and Mongol-ruled Middle East. Scholars often describe Syriac culture as a culture of contact: it arose in a Semitic language environment, absorbed Greek Christian and philosophical learning, developed inside Iranian and Arabic-speaking political worlds, and would go on to play a major role in the transmission of Greek scholarship into Arabic.

A wide range of terms are used nowadays to refer to Syriac. For some authors, the term "Syriac" is used only for Classical Syriac, and it is used alongside other terminology like "Neo-Syriac", "Modern Syriac", "Assyrian Neo-Aramaic", "Chaldean Neo-Aramaic", and related terms for modern vernaculars and literary standards. Nineteenth-century Literary Urmia Aramaic, for example, was based on the Neo-Aramaic dialect of the Urmia region rather than on Classical Syriac, though it was written within communities whose older learned language was Syriac.

== Periodization ==
Sebastian Brock divides Syriac literature into three broad periods. The first is the "golden age" of Syriac literature, which extends to the seventh century and includes the most creative phase of classical Syriac writing.

The second is the "Arab period", from the seventh century to about 1300. Brock describes this era, which ended around the time of the Mongols' conversion to Islam, as one of consolidation and compilation. It saw the growth of encyclopaedic forms of Syriac learning and culminated in the work of the thirteenth-century polymath Bar Hebraeus.

The third period runs from about 1300 to the present. Although its beginning was difficult for Middle Eastern Christian communities, classical Syriac continued to be used as a literary language, while modern Syriac writing emerged more visibly in seventeenth-century poetry from the Alqosh school in northern Iraq and expanded in the nineteenth century with the Syriac press at Urmia.

== Language, scripts, and manuscripts ==
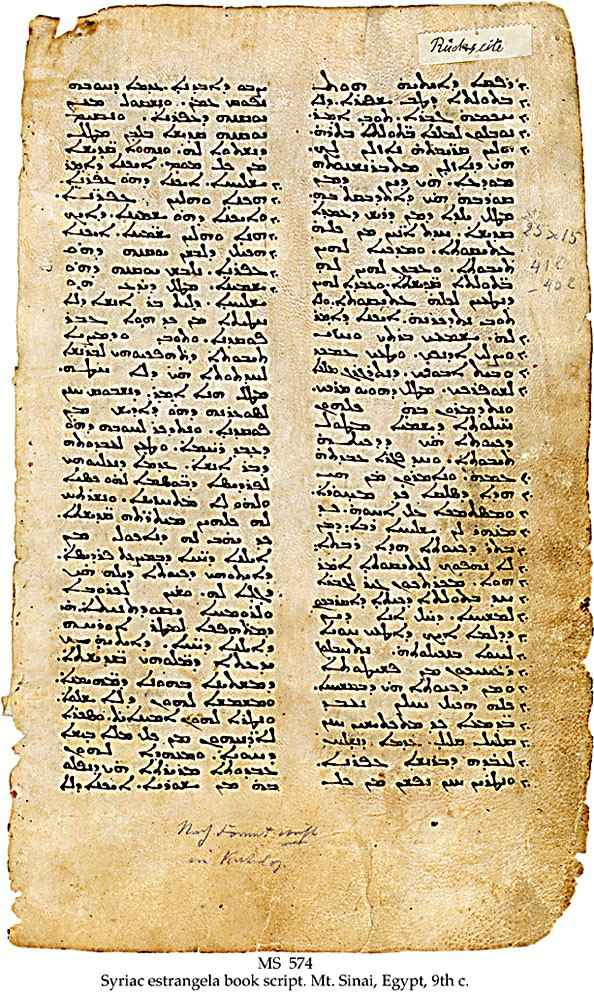
Page from a Syriac translation of Abba Isaiah's Asceticon, from a 6th-century manuscript in Estrangela script, from the Monastery of St Catherine, Mt Sinai (Schøyen Collection MS 574)

Syriac belongs to the Aramaic branch of the Semitic languages. Its earliest inscriptions are close to other late antique Aramaic scripts, while the formal book hand that came to dominate early manuscripts is known as Estrangela. Later manuscript traditions developed distinct West Syriac and East Syriac scripts, commonly called Serto and the East Syriac script. These scripts were used for biblical, liturgical, monastic, scholarly, and documentary texts.

The manuscript tradition is central to the history of Syriac literature. Many works survive in relatively late copies, while others are preserved only in fragments, quotations, translations, or palimpsests. Syriac manuscript culture was also geographically mobile. Manuscripts copied in Mesopotamia, Syria, Egypt, India, and later Europe preserve texts from different ecclesiastical traditions and often bear witness to multilingual settings in which Syriac stood beside Greek, Arabic, Armenian, Coptic, Persian, and other languages.

The early modern European study of Syriac depended heavily on eastern Christian manuscripts and scholars, especially Maronite scholars who worked in Rome and Paris. The complete Syriac Bible first appeared in print in the Paris Polyglot, and Syriac grammars, lexica, biblical editions, and typefaces became part of early modern oriental scholarship.

== Historical development ==
=== Beginnings to the third century ===
The earliest Syriac Christian literature developed in a religiously diverse northern Mesopotamian environment. Early texts include the Odes of Solomon, the Acts of Thomas, the Book of the Laws of Countries associated with the school of Bardaisan, early gospel traditions such as the Diatessaron, and the first stages of Syriac biblical translation. These works show a mixture of poetry, narrative, apologetic, ascetic, philosophical, and biblical interests.

The Syriac Bible played an unusually formative role. The Old Testament Peshitta was translated from Hebrew, probably no later than about 200 CE, and became the basis of a large exegetical and liturgical

culture. Syriac gospel traditions included the Diatessaron, the Old Syriac Gospels, and later the Peshitta New Testament, followed by more learned revisions such as the Philoxenian, Harqlean, and Syro-Hexapla versions.

=== Fourth century ===
The fourth century is treated as a major transitional moment in the creation and prominence of Syriac literature. Aphrahat, writing in the Sasanian Empire, composed the Demonstrations, a series of prose works on faith, asceticism, covenant, prayer, persecution, and relations with Judaism. Ephrem the Syrian, active in Nisibis and Edessa, became the most influential Syriac poet and theologian. His verse homilies (memre) and lyric hymns (madrashe) used biblical allusion, typology, paradox, and symbolic language to address doctrinal disputes, biblical interpretation, liturgical formation, and Christian devotion.

Ephrem's poetry also illustrates the overlap between literary, liturgical, and pedagogical settings. Madrashe could be sung, studied, and reused in worship, while memre served both exegetical and homiletic purposes. Syriac Christianity used poetry for both its aesthetic purpose and its theological vividness.

Fourth-century and early fifth-century Syriac works also include the Book of Steps, martyr acts connected with Sasanian persecutions, and ascetic writings that reflect the prominence of renunciation in early Syriac Christian life. Early Syriac asceticism was not always separated from ordinary Christian society; some ascetics lived in households or small communities, and the category later associated with monks could overlap with broader ideals of covenant, celibacy, service, and prayer.

=== Fifth to seventh centuries ===
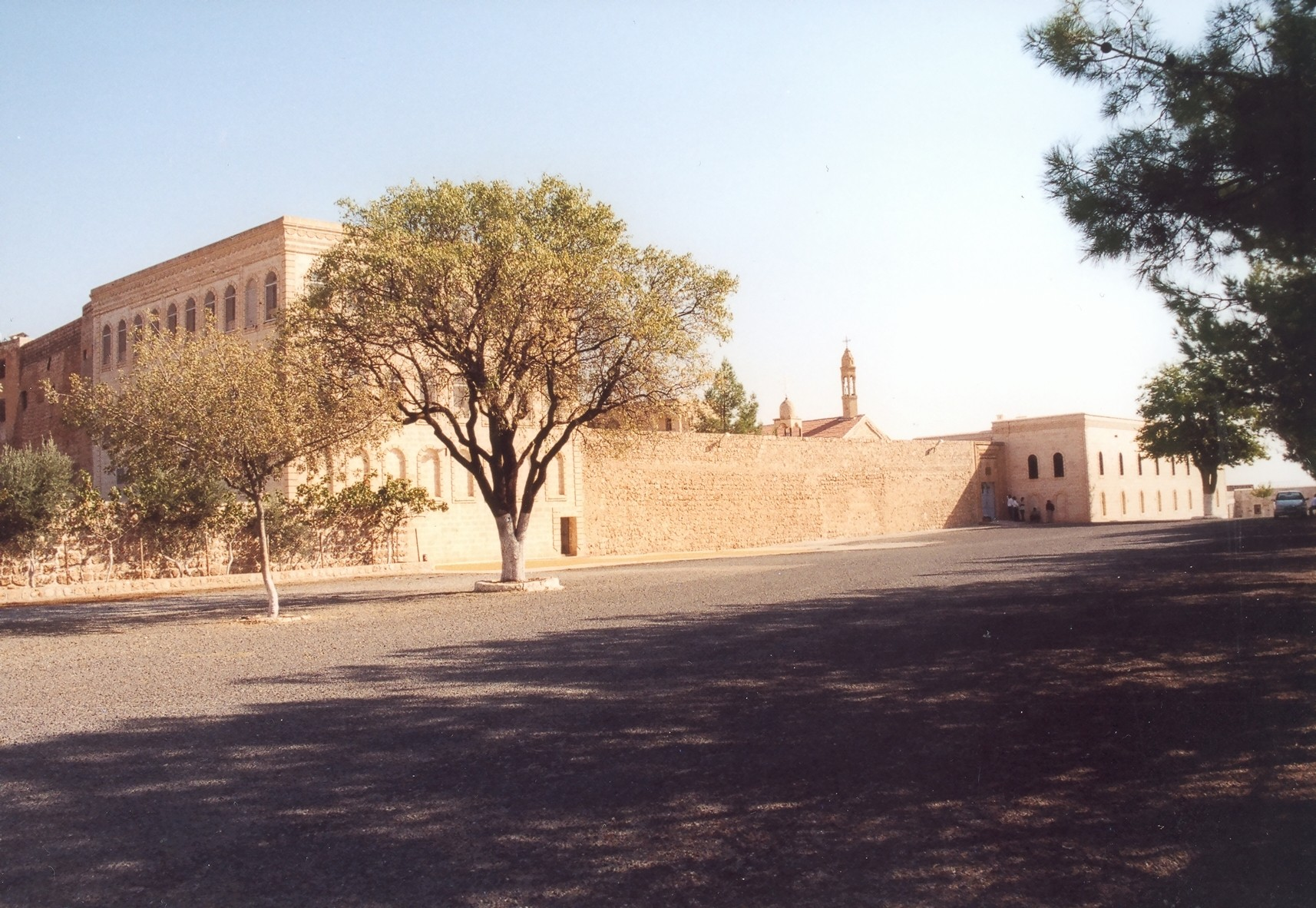
Mor Gabriel Monastery in Tur Abdin, one of the major monastic centers of the Syriac tradition.

From the fifth to the seventh centuries, Syriac literary production expanded across several ecclesiastical traditions. The period saw the growth of separate East Syriac and West Syriac literary worlds, connected respectively with the Church of the East and the Miaphysite or Syrian Orthodox tradition, while Chalcedonian Syriac Christians also produced and transmitted texts. The major literary centers for the production of Syriac literature in this era were Edessa, Nisibis, Amid, Serugh, Mabbug, Seleucia-Ctesiphon, Beth Lapat, Qenneshre, and monasteries in Tur Abdin and northern Mesopotamia came to be associated with scholarship, translation, biblical study, monastic writing, and poetry.

The School of Nisibis was especially important for East Syriac scholarly culture. Its curriculum, rules, commentaries, and institutional memory helped shape a learned class of teachers, exegetes, bishops, and monks, and it stood behind later East Syriac biblical and theological traditions.

In the West Syriac world, Greek learning entered Syriac through translation, bilingual scholarship, and monastic schools. The monastery of Qenneshre on the Euphrates became a major center for Greek study and Aristotelian learning. Figures such as Sergius of Reshaina, Athanasius of Balad, Jacob of Edessa, and the scholars associated with Qenneshre helped create the Syriac philosophical and scientific vocabulary that later fed into Arabic translation movements.

Major authors of this period include Narsai, Jacob of Serugh, Philoxenus of Mabbug, Babai the Great, Isaac of Nineveh, Sahdona, Jacob of Edessa, and John of Ephesus. Their works include metrical homilies, anti-heretical treatises, commentaries, monastic instructions, ecclesiastical histories, letters, and biographies of holy men and women.

=== Syriac under Islamic rule ===
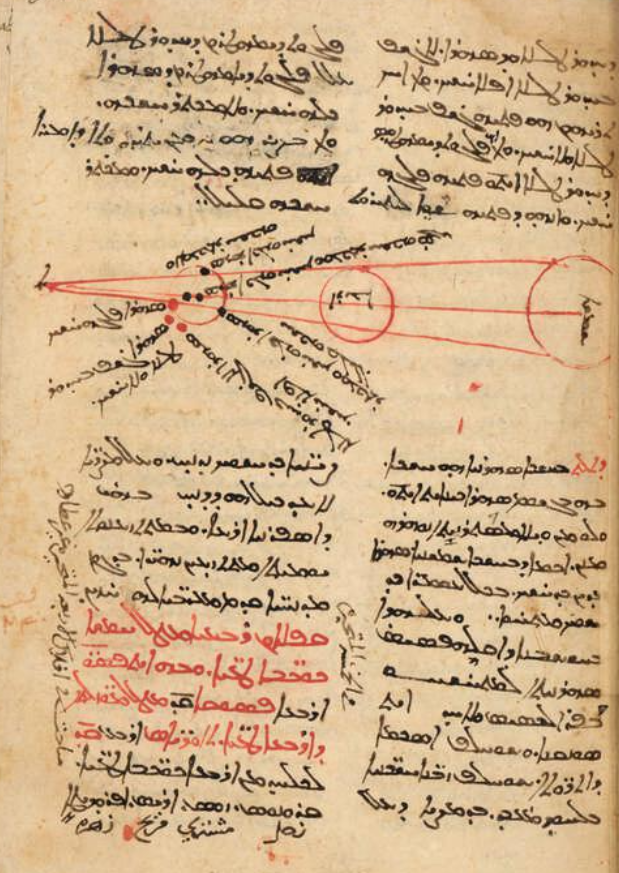
A 1340 manuscript copy of Barhebraeus' Cream of Wisdom.

The Arab conquests placed most Syriac-speaking Christian communities under Muslim rule. Syriac continued to function as a major ecclesiastical language, but Arabic gradually became the primary medium for the major uses of writing among local communities. From the eighth to the eleventh centuries, Syriac Christians increasingly articulated their theology in Arabic while preserving Syriac as a scriptural, liturgical, monastic, and learned language.

In this time, Syriac Christians were central to the translation of Greek philosophy, medicine, and science into Syriac and Arabic. The work of Hunayn ibn Ishaq, Ishaq ibn Hunayn, and other translators in Abbasid Baghdad was made possible by earlier eras of Syriac engagement with Greek literature. Syriac medicine and philosophy were therefore both continuations of late antique Greek learning and contributors to the intellectual culture of the Islamic world.

Syriac literary activity did not end during this time. Instead, authors wrote commentaries, chronicles, lexica, grammars, canon-law collections, theological syntheses, hagiography, and poetry. At the same time, the growth of Christian Arabic literature altered the linguistic ecology of Syriac communities, especially in urban centers such as Baghdad, Mosul, Damascus, and later Aleppo.

=== The Syriac Renaissance ===
The term "Syriac Renaissance" is commonly used for the revival or intensification of Syriac writing in roughly the eleventh to thirteenth centuries. The label was popularized by Anton Baumstark, though modern scholars use it cautiously because the period varied by region, genre, and church tradition. The Renaissance is associated with renewed poetry, grammar, historiography, philosophy, theology, manuscript production, and artistic patronage.

One of the most characteristic features of the period was the interaction between Syriac and Arabic learned culture. East Syriac authors had long been active in Arabic-speaking centers, while West Syriac writers of the twelfth and thirteenth centuries increasingly engaged Arabic philosophy, science, historiography, and literary forms. Bar Hebraeus wrote in Syriac and Arabic, adapted Arabic sources for Syriac readers, and produced works in history, grammar, theology, philosophy, ethics, medicine, and poetry. Abdisho bar Brikha composed catalogues, legal and theological works, and elaborate poetry, including the Paradise of Eden.

The poetry of the later period shows formal changes. Rhyme, more systematic stanzaic structures, complex acrostics, and learned wordplay became more common, partly under Arabic influence. Authors such as Barhebraeus, Abdisho bar Berika, Giwargis Warda, and Khamis bar Qardahe demonstrate the continued prestige of Syriac as a poetic and scholarly language even in a predominantely Arabic-speaking environment.

=== Late medieval, early modern, and modern periods ===
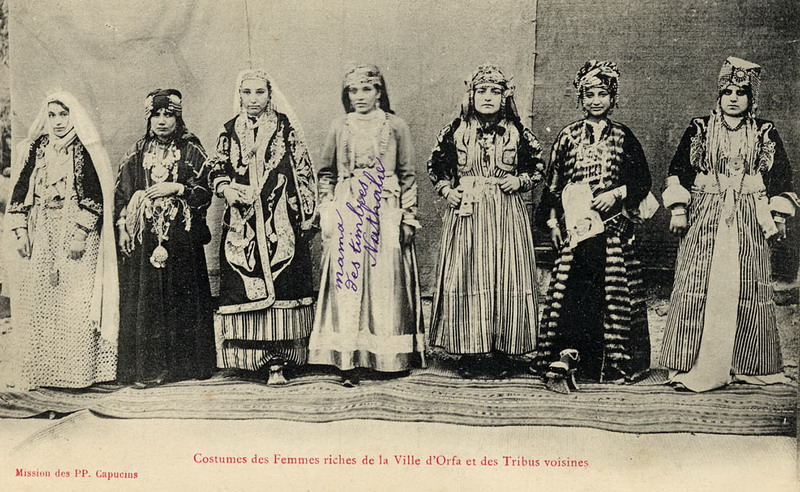
A pre-1920 image from Urfa, ancient Edessa, one of the central cities associated with early Syriac Christianity and literature.

After the collapse of Mongol power in the Middle East, the volume of new Syriac writing declined in many regions, though manuscript copying, liturgical use, poetry, chronicles, and local scholarly traditions continued. Syriac-speaking Christians remained dispersed across the Middle East, India, Central Asia, Cyprus, and diaspora settings, and their literary production increasingly took place in multilingual environments.

Modern Syriac and Neo-Aramaic literature developed in several centers. In northern Iraq, Neo-Aramaic poetry is attested from at least the sixteenth century, especially around Alqosh. In nineteenth-century Urmia, American Presbyterian missionaries, working with local Assyrian Christians, helped shape the spoken Neo-Aramaic vernacular of the Urmia region into Literary Urmia Aramaic. Printing, Bible translation, schools, newspapers, and mission presses gave this literary standard a wide role before the disruptions of the First World War.

Modern Syriac writing has continued in the Middle East, the Caucasus, Europe, the Americas, and Australia, often in conditions of displacement. It includes education, journalism, religious and ecclesial writing, linguistic scholarship, historical memory, and communal identity formation.

== Genres ==
=== Biblical translation and interpretation ===
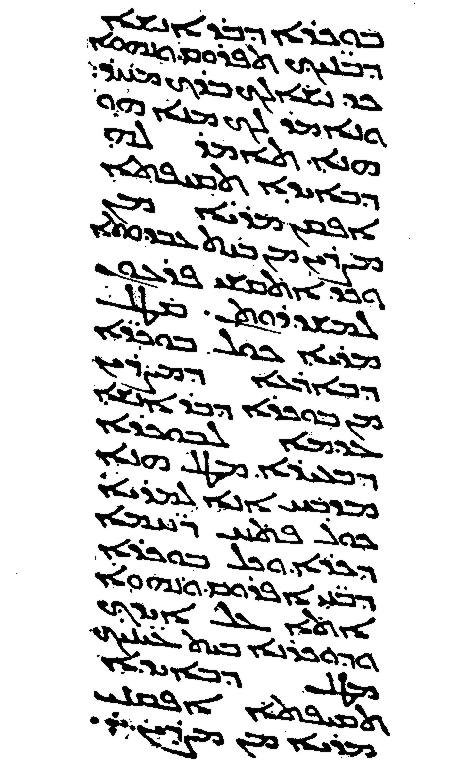
A manuscript witness to the Peshitta, the standard Syriac version of the Bible.

The Bible is the foundation of much Syriac literature. Syriac biblical translation began early, and the Peshitta became the dominant biblical version for Syriac churches. Later revisions and translations, including the Philoxenian, Harklean, and Syro-Hexapla, show how Syriac scholars interacted with Greek textual traditions.

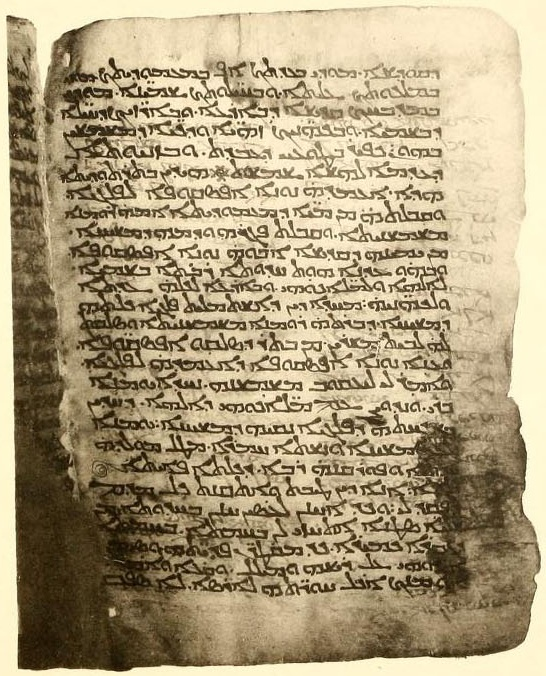
A page of the Syriac Sinaiticus, an important Old Syriac Gospel manuscript.

Syriac biblical interpretation took many forms. Prose commentaries explained biblical books section by section; verse homilies retold or interpreted scriptural passages; dialogue poems dramatized biblical scenes; liturgical commentaries connected Scripture to ritual practice; and hagiography embedded saints inside biblical typologies. Ephrem's poetry is the best-known example of a Syriac literary world saturated with biblical allusion, but the same habit of scriptural reuse characterizes many later authors.

=== Poetry and hymnography ===
Poetry is one of the most distinctive features of Syriac literature. Two major forms are the madrasha, a stanzaic hymn often associated with melodies and refrains, and the memra, a verse homily often composed in couplets. These forms allowed Syriac writers to combine exegesis, doctrinal argument, narrative, and praise.

Ephrem gave the madrasha and memra exceptional literary authority, but later poets developed the tradition in new directions. Jacob of Serugh became famous for expansive verse homilies; Narsai was a major East Syriac poet and theologian; and later medieval poets used rhyme, acrostics, and elaborate rhetorical structures for didactic, devotional, and scholarly purposes.

=== Hagiography, martyrdom, and foundation legends ===
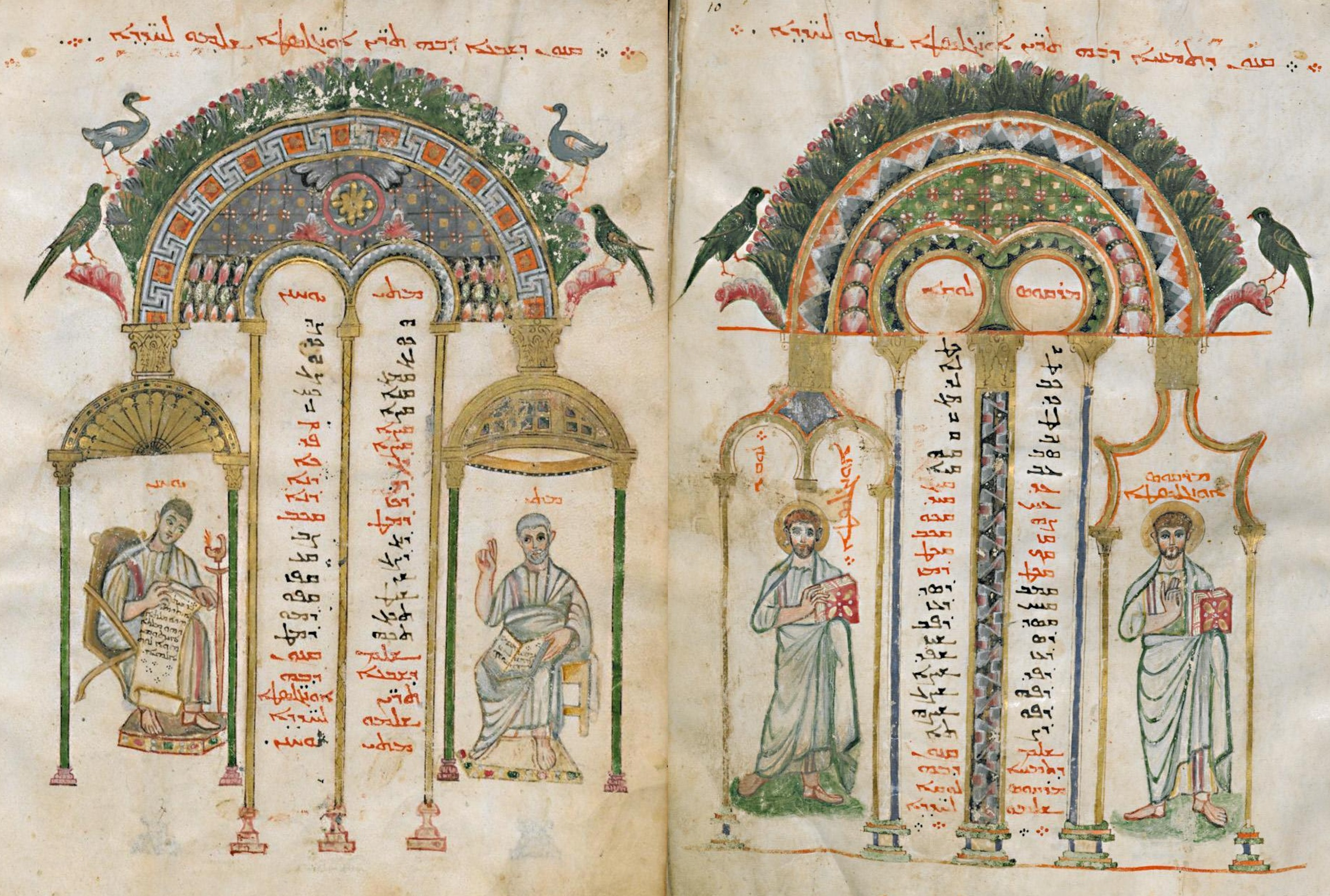
The four evangelists in the sixth-century Rabbula Gospels, one of the best-known illuminated Syriac manuscripts.

Syriac hagiography includes lives of saints, martyr acts, miracle stories, apostolic legends, monastic biographies, and missionary narratives. A large Syriac hagiographic corpus survives, including original compositions and translations from Greek and other languages. These texts were not simply biographies; they shaped communal memory, liturgical devotion, local geography, and claims about orthodoxy and apostolic origins.

Missionary stories were especially important for explaining the origins of Syriac churches. Texts such as the Acts of Thomas, the Teaching of Addai, and the Acts of Mari linked Edessa, India, Mesopotamia, and Persia to apostolic founders. Later lives of Simeon of Beth Arsham, Jacob Baradaeus, and Ahudemmeh used similar missionary patterns to articulate the identity of emerging Syriac ecclesiastical communities.

Martyr literature likewise served both devotional and historical purposes. Persian martyr acts represented Christian endurance under Sasanian rule, while later hagiography recorded ascetics, bishops, missionaries, women saints, and monastic communities. John of Ephesus's Lives of the Eastern Saints is a major example of sixth-century Syriac hagiography rooted in ascetic society and Miaphysite crisis.

=== Historiography ===
Syriac historiography includes chronicles, ecclesiastical histories, local histories, dynastic narratives, and universal histories. Early and medieval works include the Chronicle of Edessa, the Chronicle of Joshua the Stylite, the histories associated with John of Ephesus and Pseudo-Zachariah, the Chronicle of Zuqnin, the lost work of Theophilus of Edessa, the chronicle of Dionysius of Tel Mahre, the Chronicle of Michael the Syrian, and the historical works of Barhebraeus.

These texts do not form a single continuous tradition. Some were local records; some were ecclesiastical histories modelled on Greek precedents; some drew on archives, oral memory, hagiography, and apocalyptic expectation; and others integrated Roman, Persian, Arab, and biblical history into universal chronologies.

=== Theology, asceticism, and mysticism ===
Syriac theology often took poetic, exegetical, and ascetic forms rather than the scholastic genres familiar from Greek and Latin Christianity. Authors addressed Christology, the Trinity, the sacraments, biblical interpretation, prayer, monastic discipline, and spiritual progress through hymns, homilies, letters, commentaries, and monastic treatises.

Ascetic and mystical literature is especially prominent. The Book of Steps reflects a community organized around degrees of Christian perfection; Isaac of Nineveh became one of the most widely read Syriac mystical authors; and East Syriac authors such as John of Dalyatha and Joseph Hazzaya developed sophisticated accounts of prayer, contemplation, and spiritual perception.

=== Philosophy, medicine, and science ===
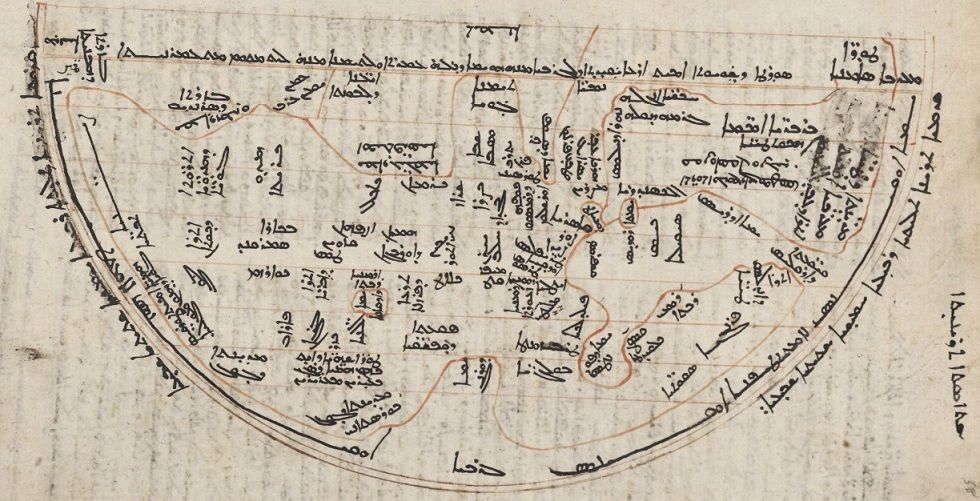
A Syriac world map associated with the works of Barhebraeus.

From late antiquity into the Abbasid period, Syriac scholars translated, summarized, commented on, and taught Greek philosophy, medicine, logic, astronomy, and natural science. Sergius of Reshaina connected Aristotelian philosophy, medicine, and Christian theology; Qenneshre (the large West Syriac monastery) helped transmit Greek philosophical learning in Syriac; and Syriac translations and scholars later formed part of the intellectual background of Arabic philosophy.

Medicine was another important field of Syriac scholarly writing. Syriac medical texts include translations of Galen, pharmacological works, diagnostic and therapeutic writings, and references to medical knowledge in hagiography, poetry, exegesis, and monastic writing. Syriac Christian physicians and translators contributed to the movement of Greek medical learning into Arabic and, through eastern Christian networks, into wider Asian contexts.

== Literary centers and institutions ==
Syriac literature was produced in cities, schools, monasteries, courts, and village churches. Edessa was the symbolic center of early Syriac Christianity and the source of many origin legends. Edessa, Nisibis, Amid, Serugh, Mabbug, Seleucia-Ctesiphon, Beth Lapat, Qenneshre, and monasteries in Egypt and the Levant all played roles in the copying, teaching, translation, and composition of Syriac works.

Schools and monasteries shaped the genres of Syriac writing. The School of Nisibis supported biblical commentary, grammar, disputation, and theological training in the Church of the East. Qenneshre supported Greek and Syriac bilingual learning. Monastic environments preserved ascetic writing, copied manuscripts, produced hagiography, and maintained liturgical poetry.

== Legacy ==
Syriac literature is significant for several fields of study. For late antique Christianity, it preserves traditions from regions often marginal in Greek and Latin narratives. For biblical studies, it supplies early versions and interpretations of the Bible. For Islamic intellectual history, it documents the Christian Syriac contribution to Greek-Arabic translation and scientific learning. For the history of the Middle East, it provides chronicles, saints' lives, legal texts, letters, colophons, and liturgical works that illuminate communities living between empires and languages.

The literature also remains a living heritage. Classical Syriac is still used in worship and scholarship, while modern Neo-Aramaic literatures continue among Assyrian, Chaldean, Syriac, and related communities in the Middle East and diaspora.

== Selected works ==
The following works are commonly treated in scholarship as representative or especially influential examples of Syriac literary production across genres and periods:

- Peshitta - the standard Syriac biblical version, whose Old Testament was translated from Hebrew and whose later New Testament form became central to Syriac churches, exegesis, and liturgy.
- Acts of Thomas - a third-century Syriac apocryphal narrative about the apostle Thomas and India, notable for its apostolic legend, liturgical scenes, and embedded poems.
- Demonstrations of Aphrahat - fourth-century prose treatises from the Sasanian Empire on Christian life, asceticism, faith, covenant, persecution, and Judaism.
- Hymns on Paradise of Ephrem the Syrian - a major example of Ephrem's symbolic and biblical poetry, representing the central role of hymnography in classical Syriac theology.
- Book of Steps - an anonymous late fourth- or early fifth-century ascetic work organized around stages of Christian perfection and renunciation.
- Cave of Treasures - a sixth-century retelling of the biblical narrative, beginning with the creation of the world and ending at Pentecost
- Homilies of Narsai - East Syriac verse homilies associated with the school tradition of Edessa and Nisibis, especially important for biblical interpretation, liturgy, and theology in the Church of the East.
- Homilies of Jacob of Serugh - West Syriac verse homilies that became one of the largest and most influential bodies of Syriac poetic preaching.
- Lives of the Eastern Saints of John of Ephesus - a sixth-century Syriac hagiographic collection preserving ascetic biographies and Miaphysite communal memory.
- Chronicon Syriacum of Bar Hebraeus - a thirteenth-century universal chronicle by the leading polymath of the Syriac Renaissance, reflecting the encyclopaedic and historical interests of later Syriac scholarship.

== See also ==
- Peshitta
- Christian literature
- Church of the East
- Ephrem the Syrian
- Neo-Aramaic languages
- School of Nisibis
- Syriac Christianity
- Syriac language
- Syriac Orthodox Church
- ʿeltā

== Sources ==
- Becker, Adam H. (2006). Fear of God and the Beginning of Wisdom: The School of Nisibis and Christian Scholastic Culture in Late Antique Mesopotamia. Philadelphia: University of Pennsylvania Press.
- Briquel-Chatonnet, Francoise; Debie, Muriel (2023). The Syriac World: In Search of a Forgotten Christianity. New Haven: Yale University Press.
- Briquel-Chatonnet, Francoise (2019). "Writing Syriac: Manuscripts and inscriptions". In King, Daniel (ed.). The Syriac World. London: Routledge. pp. 243–265.
- Brock, Sebastian P. (1997). A Brief Outline of Syriac Literature. Kottayam: St. Ephrem Ecumenical Research Institute. ISBN 978-1-61143-563-4.
- Brock, Sebastian P. (2006). The Bible in the Syriac Tradition (2nd rev. ed.). Piscataway, NJ: Gorgias Press.
- Brock, Sebastian P. (2017). An Introduction to Syriac Studies (3rd ed.). Piscataway, NJ: Gorgias Press.
- Brock, Sebastian P. (2019). "Later Syriac poetry". In King, Daniel (ed.). The Syriac World. London: Routledge. pp. 327–338.
- Butts, Aaron M. (2019). "The Classical Syriac Language". The Syriac World. London: Routledge. pp. 222–242. doi:10.4324/9781315708195-15. ISBN 978-1-315-70819-5.
- Carlson, Thomas A. (2019). "Syriac in a diverse Middle East, 1300-1500". In King, Daniel (ed.). The Syriac World. London: Routledge. pp. 718–730.
- Griffith, Sidney H. (2008). The Church in the Shadow of the Mosque: Christians and Muslims in the World of Islam. Princeton: Princeton University Press.
- Harvey, Susan Ashbrook (1990). Asceticism and Society in Crisis: John of Ephesus and the Lives of the Eastern Saints. Berkeley: University of California Press.
- Kessel, Grigory (2019). "Syriac medicine". In King, Daniel (ed.). The Syriac World. London: Routledge. pp. 438–459.
- King, Daniel (2019). "Introduction". In King, Daniel (ed.). The Syriac World. London: Routledge. pp. 1–6.
- Loopstra, Jonathan A. (2019). "The Syriac Bible and its interpretation". In King, Daniel (ed.). The Syriac World. London: Routledge. pp. 293–308.
- Minov, Sergey (2020). Memory and Identity in the Syriac Cave of Treasures: Rewriting the Bible in Sasanian Iran. Brill.
- Murre-van den Berg, Heleen L. (1999). From a Spoken to a Written Language: The Introduction and Development of Literary Urmia Aramaic in the Nineteenth Century. Leiden: Nederlands Instituut voor het Nabije Oosten.
- Murre-van den Berg, Heleen L. (2019). "Syriac identity in the modern era". In King, Daniel (ed.). The Syriac World. London: Routledge. pp. 770–782.
- Murray, Robert (2006). Symbols of Church and Kingdom: A Study in Early Syriac Tradition (2nd ed.). London: T&T Clark.
- Pirtea, Adrian (2019). "Mysticism in the Church of the East". In King, Daniel (ed.). The Syriac World. London: Routledge. pp. 355–376.
- Possekel, Ute (2019). "The Emergence of Syriac Literature to AD 400". The Syriac World. London: Routledge. pp. 309–326. ISBN 9781138899018.
- Saint-Laurent, Jeanne-Nicole Mellon (2015). Missionary Stories and the Formation of the Syriac Churches. Oakland: University of California Press.
- Saint-Laurent, Jeanne-Nicole (2019). "Syriac Hagiographic Literature". The Syriac World. London: Routledge. pp. 339–354. ISBN 9781138899018.
- Teule, Herman (2010). "The Syriac Renaissance". In Teule, Herman; Tauwinkl, Carmen Fotescu; ter Haar Romeny, Bas; van Ginkel, Jan (eds.). The Syriac Renaissance. Leuven: Peeters. pp. 1–29.
- Watt, John W. (2019). The Aristotelian Tradition in Syriac. London: Routledge.
- Weitzman, Michael P. (1999). The Syriac Version of the Old Testament: An Introduction. Cambridge: Cambridge University Press.
- Weltecke, Dorothea; Younansardaroud, Helen (2019). "The Renaissance of Syriac Literature in the Twelfth–Thirteenth Centuries". The Syriac World. London: Routledge. pp. 698–717. ISBN 9781138899018.
- Wickes, Jeffrey (2019). Bible and Poetry in Late Antique Mesopotamia: Ephrem's Hymns on Faith. Oakland: University of California Press.
- Wilkinson, Robert J. (2019). "The early study of Syriac in Europe". In King, Daniel (ed.). The Syriac World. London: Routledge. pp. 746–762.
- Wood, Philip (2019). "Historiography in the Syriac-Speaking World, 300–1000". The Syriac World. London: Routledge. pp. 405–421. ISBN 9781138899018.
