= Catholicosate =

Type of primacy in Eastern Christianity

A catholicosate (pronounced /kəˈθɒlɪkəˌseɪt/) or catholicate is a particular ecclesiastical primacy, headed by a primate titled as a catholicos. Such regional primacies exist within various branches of Eastern Christianity, especially those of Oriental Orthodox tradition. The term catholicosate also designates the area of responsibility (territorial or otherwise) of a catholicos. The word is derived from the Greek Καθολικος, meaning "wholeness", and it was used to designate ecclesiastical primacy of some major metropolitan sees.

While a catholicos is sometimes considered to correspond to a bishop in the Roman Catholic and Protestant traditions, a catholicate is typically a larger and more significant organizational division than a bishopric, archdiocese or episcopal see. Catholicates often have distinct cultural traditions established over many centuries.

Within the Armenian Apostolic Church there are two catholicosates: the Mother See of Holy Etchmiadzin in Etchmiadzin, Armenia, and the Catholicosate of the Great House of Cilicia in Antelias, Lebanon. In the 10th century, when lands inhabited by Armenians were devastated by Seljuks, the Armenian church took refuge in Cilicia. In the 15th century, a new catholicos was elected in Etchmiadzin.

In the Syriac Orthodox Church there existed Catholicate of Tigris (or Maphrianate of Tagrit), also known as the Catholicate of the East which was established in 628–629 AD as the ecclesiastical headquarters for the Syriac Orthodox Church (Jacobite) within the Persian Empire, separate from the Church of the East. Centered in Tagrit (modern-day Iraq) on the Tigris River, the Maphrian held the second-highest rank after the Patriarch of Antioch, ruling until the seat moved to Mosul. Currently it is situated in India and known as the Catholicate of India.

In the independent sacramental movement, there was once a denomination known as the Catholicate of the West.

While some traditions favor the English language spelling "catholicate", others favor "catholicosate." There is a degree of inconsistency in this regard. Others spellings, including "catholicossate", are seen as well.

== Sources ==
- Chabot, Jean-Baptiste (1902). Synodicon orientale ou recueil de synodes nestoriens (PDF). Paris: Imprimerie Nationale.
- Meyendorff, John (1989). Imperial unity and Christian divisions: The Church 450-680 A.D. The Church in history. Vol. 2. Crestwood, NY: St. Vladimir's Seminary Press. ISBN 9780881410563.
