= Henana of Adiabene =

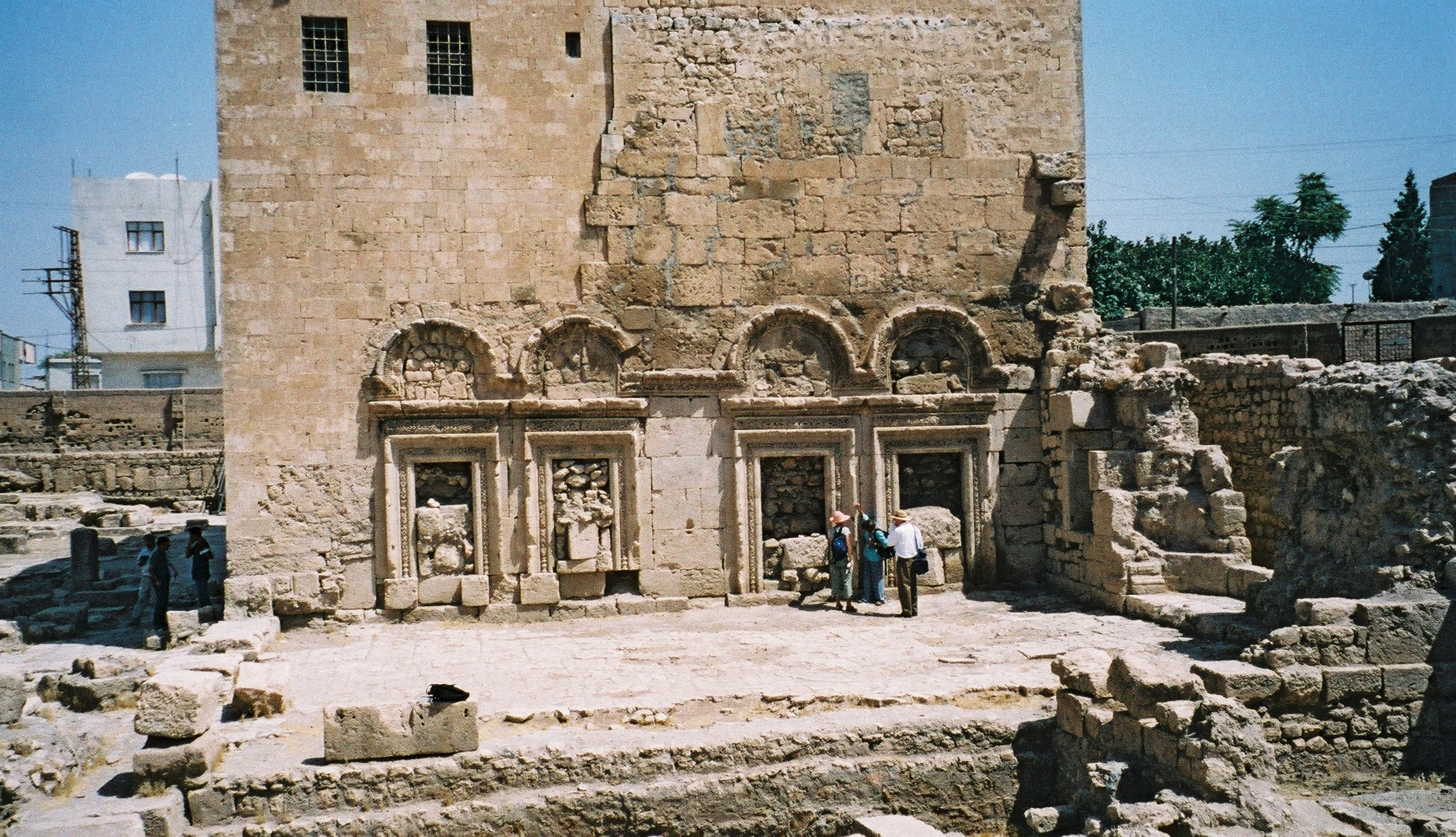
Archeological remains of the medieval East Syriac church of Mar Yaqob in Nisibis

Henana of Adiabene (died 610) was a Christian theologian, and headmaster of the School of Nisibis, the main theological center of the Church of the East (571–610).

== Biography ==
Before he became headmaster, Henana of Adiabene had occupied the chair of biblical exegesis. His teacher was a certain Moses, who was probably an Eastern Orthodox Christian. Many of Henana's ideas were close to Byzantine theology, and his appointment as head of the school might have been in line with a general uneasiness with pro-Antiochene theological discourse, previously set by the Synod of Beth Lapat (484). His predecessor headmaster was Abraham of Beth Rabban, who had worked hard to promote the Antiochene theology of Theodore of Mopsuestia.

Henana was a humble man, worked tirelessly, and stood to his convictions. Under his leadership the school initially continued to grow. He wrote extensive commentaries and other works, but only two works and a number of citations have been preserved. A speech for the commencement of the academic year from the time when Henana was director has survived, and in it Henana is described as the equal of Theodore in productivity, and with the authority to choose the best from among all traditions. However, Henana did not reconcile the teaching of Theodore with the other creeds; he tried to replace him.

=== Christological dispute ===
Theodore of Mopsuestia held that union of Christ's two natures (divine and human) is manifested as a prosopic union. Henana on the other hand favored the concept of a hypostatic union of the two natures, as specified by the Council of Chalcedon in 451. Accordingly, he believed in God's suffering on the Cross, impossible without a hypostatic union between the two natures. Those christological controversies were reflected in a debate between pro-Chalcedonian supporters of "one-qnoma" Christology and pro-Antiochene supporters of "two-qnome" Christology (qnoma, a Syriac term, translated as "hypostasis"). The divide between two groups was worsened by interventions on the part of West Syriac miaphysites.

Henana's one-qnoma theology was attacked by Babai the Great, whose criticism of Henana's views was generally accepted by the Church of the East, though Henana remained a significant influence in the Church's subsequent tradition of interpretation.

Henana accepted the decisions of the Council of Ephesus (431), believing that the term 'mother of God' was appropriate for the Virgin Mary. Theodore of Mopsuestia had taught that man was created mortal. Henana believed that Adam was initially immortal, and that he became mortal through sin. It also appears that Henana rejected Theodore's idea that the book of Job was a book of fiction composed by a Hellenist, and rejected his commentary on Job.

Henana's pro-Byzantine orientation was so prominent that he was accused by his opponents for possible tendencies towards Origenism, a theological position that was popular among some Byzantine monks, but disputed and finally condemned in 553. One of the more extreme positions held by the followers of Origen was the denial of the resurrection of the body of the Lord on the third day. This clashed head on with any literal interpretation of scripture, certainly with the rigorous literal interpretation of the Antiochene type.

=== Growing opposition ===
As Henana's break with tradition became more open, opposition grew. In Nisibis, the Deacon Elijah established the rival school of Beth Sahde, and made a man from the school of Balad director, who had also lived on the monastery of Mt. Izla and was a disciple of Abraham the Great of Kashkar. His name was Abimelek, and his great opponent Babai the Great later glorified him in a biography of 'The Priest and Martyr Abimelek'.

In 596 Sabrisho, an alumnus of the school of Nisibis, was appointed successor of Ishoʿyahb I as Catholicos. He immediately held a synod and anathematized the opponents of Theodore, though he did not mention Henana explicitly. At the same time or sometimes after, Gregory, another alumnus of the school of Nisibis, became Metropolitan of Nisibis, probably chosen by Sabrisho. Gregory first reproached and censored, later condemned the writings of Henana. Henana wrote a defense to Sabrisho that resulted in his excommunication by the other bishops.

But Henana was not without protection: Queen Shirin was a convert from the Church of the East to the Syriac Orthodox Church, and so was Gabriel of Shiggar, the influential royal physician. They supported Henana. As Babai the Great reports: 'the medical science at the court had taken sides with Henana. This tilted the scales in favor of Henana and upset the carefully prepared strategy of his enemies. Of course, all this was clear to Sabrisho.'

In 601 Bishop Gregory had to leave and was ordered by the king to live in the monastery of Shahdost. The Catholicos disagreed with the excommunication and was spared the royal wrath. But Henana's position could not be saved. Even though he stayed head of the school, 300 souls left the same year. (There is some doubt on when exactly these events took place. But all sources agree that they happened under the Catholicos Sabrisho).

Some of the exiles went to the monastery of Mar Abraham on Mt. Izla, others were welcomed by Marcos, bishop of Balad, at his school. Still others went to the rival school-monastery of Beth Sahde in Nisibis itself. Only 20 persons stayed with Henana, and the school hardly struggled on.

=== Legacy ===
Two years after the death of Henana, the teachings of Theodore were canonized by an episcopal gathering, and the Christology of Theodore became the official doctrine of the Church.

Of the many writings of Henana very little has been preserved, and the Church of the East has rejected him. But in order to refute him, Babai the Great clarified the Christology of the Church of the East, which otherwise might not have happened.

== See also ==
- Nisibis (East Syriac ecclesiastical province)

== Sources ==
- Baum, Wilhelm; Winkler, Dietmar W. (2003). The Church of the East: A Concise History. London-New York: Routledge-Curzon. ISBN 9781134430192.
- Brock, Sebastian P. (1999). "The Christology of the Church of the East in the Synods of the Fifth to Early Seventh Centuries: Preliminary Considerations and Materials". Doctrinal Diversity: Varieties of Early Christianity. New York and London: Garland Publishing. pp. 281–298. ISBN 9780815330714.
- Brock, Sebastian P. (2006). Fire from Heaven: Studies in Syriac Theology and Liturgy. Aldershot: Ashgate. ISBN 9780754659082.
- Meyendorff, John (1989). Imperial unity and Christian divisions: The Church 450-680 A.D. Crestwood, NY: St. Vladimir's Seminary Press. ISBN 9780881410563.
- Reinink, Gerrit J. (1995). "Edessa Grew Dim and Nisibis Shone Forth: The School of Nisibis at the Transition of the Sixth-Seventh Century". Centres of Learning: Learning and Location in Pre-modern Europe and the Near East. Leiden: Brill. pp. 77–89. ISBN 9004101934.
- Wilmshurst, David (2011). The martyred Church: A History of the Church of the East. London: East & West Publishing Limited. ISBN 9781907318047.
