= Elishaʿ bar Quzbaye =

Hermeneut and apologist of the Church of the East

Elishaʿ bar Quzbaye (fl. c. 450 – c. 510/530) was a hermeneut and apologist of the Church of the East. Active in Persia, he served as the second or third director of the school of Nisibis. He wrote extensively in Syriac, but only a few fragments of his works survive.

== Life ==
The meaning of Elishaʿ's surname is uncertain. It may come from the village of Quzbo in Marga in Beth ʿArbaye. According to Barḥadbshabba ʿArbaya, his surname was ʿArbaya bar Quzbane. In some later manuscripts, his name is corrupted to Mar Qorbane.

According to the Chronicle of Siirt, Elishaʿ was a fellow student of Narsai at the school of Edessa before 450. Barḥadbshabba of Ḥulwān states that he was "trained in all ecclesiastical and profane books". He eventually taught biblical interpretation at the school of Nisibis, where, according to the Chronicle of Arbela, he became mpashshqānā (chief interpreter).

According to the Chronicle of Siirt and the historian Mari ibn Sulayman, the Persian king Kavad I ordered all the religious communities in Persia to submit written descriptions of their beliefs. In response to this command, the Catholicos Aqaq commissioned Elishaʿ to write a general work on Christianity, which the catholicos then had translated into Persian and presented to Kavad. This must have taken place between 488 (Kavad's accession) and 496 (Aqaq's death).

According to some sources, Elishaʿ succeeded Narsai as director of the school around 502. Barḥadbshabba ʿArbaya, however, dates the beginning of his term as director to around 522, after Abraham of Beth Rabban's first term. In any case, his term was short, lasting four years (per Barḥadbshabba) or seven (503–510, per the Chronicle).

== Works ==
Elishaʿ was the author of several apologetic, didactic and expository works in Syriac, but only two short excerpts from his commentary on Job survive, quoted by Ishoʿdad of Merv. The Chronicle of Siirt records that he also wrote commentaries on Joshua and Judges and "completed ... according to a request" the commentary of Theodore of Mopsuestia on Samuel. This last comment may mean either that he added an ending to an unfinished work by Theodore or merely that he finished its translation into Syriac. The Chronicle also credits him with a book of "meanings" of the Books of Kings, probably an exegesis of difficult passages and not a full commentary. It claims that he wrote commentaries on all the Pauline epistles, but there is no other evidence of so extensive a work. New Testament commentaries are not mentioned by Barḥadbshabba of Ḥulwān, who claims that Elishaʿ wrote commentaries on all the books of the Old Testament according to the Peshitta (Syriac) versions. This claim, too, should be taken as possible hyperbole. Writing centuries later, ʿAbdishoʿ bar Brikha knew only of Elishaʿ's commentaries on the Second Epistle to the Corinthians and the epistles to the Galatians, Ephesians and Philippians.

Besides exegetical works, Elishaʿ wrote a variety of theological and historical works. ʿAbdishoʿ and the Chronicle both record that he wrote an ʿeltā (cause, explanation) of the mawtbā (Arabic: al-mawtib), probably meaning the academic session of the school. ʿAbdishoʿ also attributes to him an ʿeltā of the martyrs, a "book of thanksgivings", a poem celebrating Shemʿon of Germakh and a commentary on the Chronicon of Eusebius of Caesarea. According to Barḥadbshabba, he wrote a defence of Christianity against the criticisms of the Magi, which he calls "an explanation of the questions of Magianism" (i.e., Zoroastrianism), in which "he resolved [repudiated] the questions the Magi raised ... against us". According to Barḥadbshabba, he also wrote a defence against "the heretics", by which are meant the Monophysites.

Elishaʿ's work for Kavad is described by the Chronicle of Siirt as covering the divine essence, the Trinity, the Hexameron, the creation of angels, the fall of Satan and the Parousia.

== Bibliography ==
- Badger, G. P., ed. (1852). The Nestorians and Their Rituals. Vol. 2. Joseph Masters. ISBN 978-0-7905-4482-3.
- Becker, Adam H. (2006). Fear of God and the Beginning of Wisdom: The School of Nisibis and the Development of Scholastic Culture in Late Antique Mesopotamia. University of Pennsylvania Press.
- Becker, Adam H., ed. (2008). Sources for the History of the School of Nisibis. Liverpool University Press.
- Reinink, G. J. (1995). "'Edessa Grew Dim and Nisibis Shone Forth': The School of Nisibis at the Transition of the Sixth–Seventh Century". In J. W. Drijvers; A. A. MacDonald (eds.). Centres of learning: Learning and Location in Pre-Modern Europe and the Near East. E. J. Brill. pp. 77–90. doi:10.1163/9789004247154. ISBN 9789004247154.
- Van Rompay, Lucas (2011). "Elishaʿ bar Quzbaye". In Sebastian P. Brock; Aaron M. Butts; George A. Kiraz; Lucas Van Rompay (eds.). Gorgias Encyclopedic Dictionary of the Syriac Heritage: Electronic Edition. Gorgias Press.
- Võõbus, Arthur (1965). History of the School of Nisibis. Secrétariat du Corpus Scriptorum Christianorum Orientalium.
