= Vivarium (monastery) =

Scholarly monastery of Cassiodorus, 544-

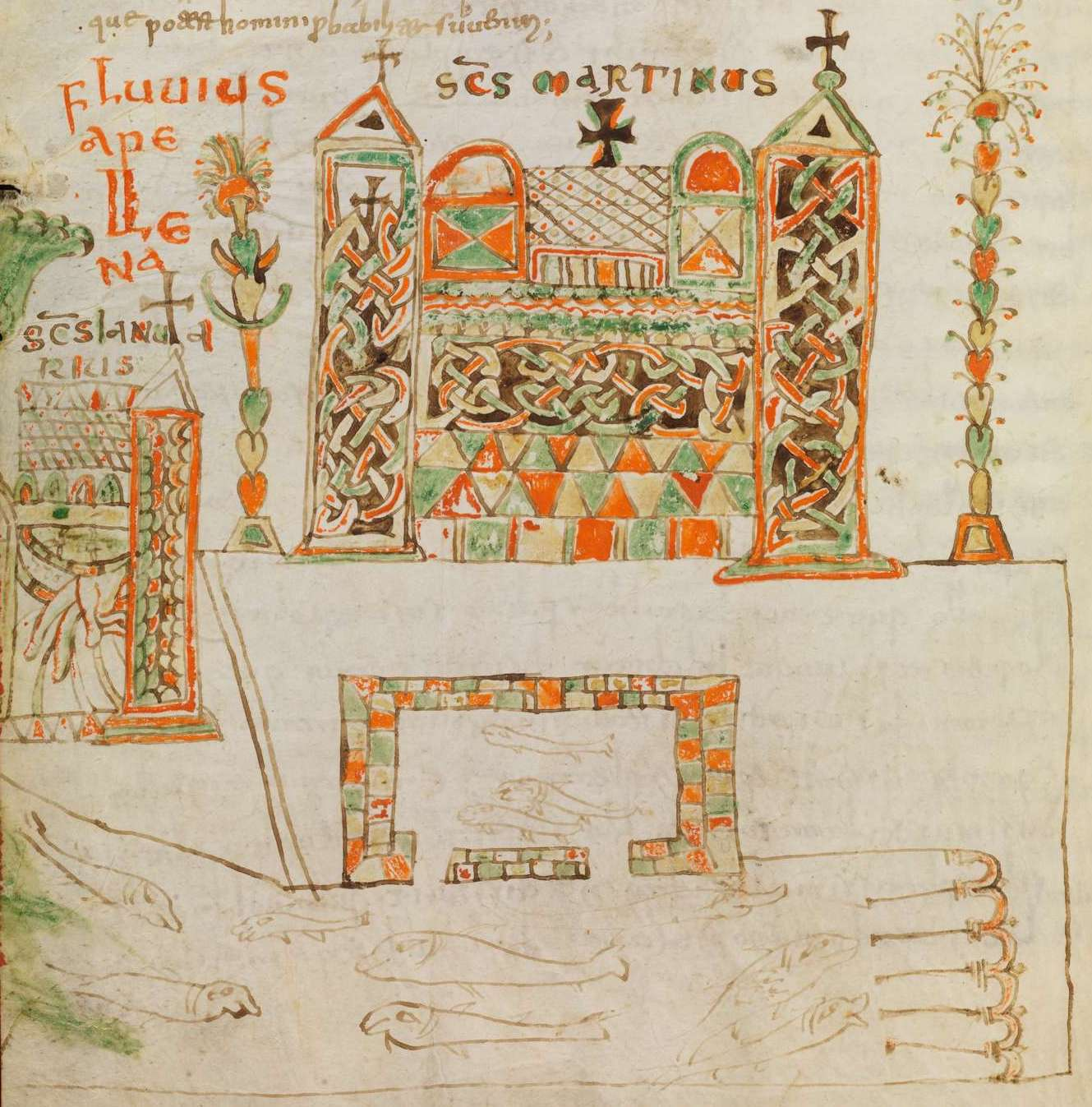
Depiction of Vivarium in an 8th-century manuscript of Cassiodorus' Institutiones

The Vivarium was a monastery founded around the year 544 by the Roman statesman Cassiodorus near Squillace, in Calabria, Italy. He also established a biblical studies center as well as a library. It became a place where scholars worked on preserving Greek and Latin classical literature. Cassiodorus donated his land to the community of Squillace so that the ‘Vivarium’ could be built there. Having acquired the Roman noble title of patricius in 507, his family had become one of the most powerful in Italy.

In 540, Cassiodorus retired from public life and moved into the monastery, ordering the Benedictine monks living there to learn about medicinal herbs and to copy various medical texts, supposedly including works of Galen, Hippocrates and of the pharmacist Dioscorides.

The immense devastation caused by the Gothic War had endangered the survival not only of classical and pagan literature, but even of Christian literature, due to the systematic destruction not only of libraries, but in many cases also of the cities that had hosted them until that moment. In war-torn Italy, even the scriptoria where the manuscripts were produced had been decimated. Under the guidance of Cassiodorus, a long process of transcription and translation of Latin and Greek texts began, with the aim of saving them and then passing them on.

Cassiodorus commissioned various Greek scholars, including Musonius and Epiphanius Scholasticus, to translate Greek works of a historical and theological nature, which were widely circulated during the Middle Ages.

Although an approach to the Christian faith can be seen in Cassiodorus's later works (consider De anima and Expositio Psalmorum), the Vivarium monastery was founded with a different purpose from the famous ora et labora: the main objective of the monastic centre was in fact the copying, conservation, writing and study of the volumes containing texts of the classics and Western patristics, that had been saved from the devastation of the barbarian peoples. The monks also received instruction in philosophy, theology and the classics (ancient Greek and Latin) directly from Cassiodorus. The characteristic of the Vivarium was therefore its function as a Middle Age scriptorium, with the related problems of finding materials, studying writing techniques and economic difficulties; the codices and manuscripts produced in the monastery achieved considerable fame and were in great demand.

The monastery was to be organised like the hermitage of Montecastello, populated by Anchorite monks with previous experience of cenobitic life. The studium aimed to reproduce the School of Alexandria and that of Nisibis, where in those years Junilius Africanus had translated the commentary on the Bible by Paul of Nisibis from Syriac to Latin.

The complex has been located in the San Martino district, 1 km from the Alessi stream, not far from the main sea routes to Africa, Spain, Crotone, Greece and Constantinople, and not far from the road that connected Rome to the north with the roads to Reggio Calabria and Sicily. It was a shelter for pilgrims and a hospital for the sick who came there from all over the region. In addition to the studium and the scriptorium, it housed a well-stocked library and a counter for the sale of manuscripts. In some cases, copies and revised editions were used to finance the activities of the Vivarium. The combination of ‘studium’ and a library represented an absolute novelty in the Italian Middle Ages.

Vivarium's strategic location favoured the flow of foodstuffs cultivated in loco, of pilgrims and of manuscripts to and from Italy and the Orient. The monastery took care of tilling various deserted areas and providing the surrounding population with the benefits of a higher material culture. For the first time, sacred and profane texts were collected together, paying a certain philological attention to keeping the original editions distinct from the subsequent amendments and corrections.

The library was extremely well-stocked for those times: it contained pagan and Christian works, in Latin and Greek. The codices, some of which were extremely valuable, were classified and arranged according to subject. Obviously, as it was a monastery, the Holy Scriptures were given pride of place; next to them were the 22 books of the Jewish Antiquities and hundreds of others dealing with Christianity. The library was enriched by a selection of significant texts from classical and Hellenistic science, including many books on cosmography: the works of Julius Honorius, Marmellinus Illyricus, or the famous codex of Ptolemy. These were followed by works on philosophy and agriculture, to help the monks become skilled farmers: among these, the treatises of Quintus Gargilius Martialis, Columella and Aemilianus are particularly noteworthy. For the monks in charge of medical care there were works by Hippocrates, Caelius Aurelianus, therapeutics by Galen and the herbal by Dioscorides. There was no lack of works by Aristotle, in the recent Latin translation by Boethius.

After Cassiodorus' death, the manuscripts housed here were dispersed, some making their way to the Lateran Palace. Vivarium's activity had an enormous influence on Europe during the early Middle Ages. Before the foundation of the Vivarium, copying manuscripts was a task reserved for inexperienced or physically infirm clerics, and carried out at the whim of literate monks. Thanks to the influence of Cassiodorus, the monastic system adopted a more rigorous, widespread and regular approach to the reproduction of documents, seen as an integral part of the monastery's activity. This approach to the development of the monastic lifestyle was mainly handed down through Germanic religious institutions.

== Bibliography ==
- Franco Cardini, Cassiodorus the Great. Rome, barbarians and monasticism, Milan, Jaca Book, 2009.
- Luciana Cuppo Csaki, Contra voluntatem fundatorum: the monasterium Vivariense Cassiodorus after 575 in: ACTA XIII Congressus Internationalis Archaeologiae Christianae (Vatican City, Split 1998) vol. II, pp. 551–586.
- Luciana Cuppo Csaki, The Monastery of Cassiodorus Vivariense: reconnaissance and research, 1994-1999, in: Frühes Rom und zwischen Christentum Konstantinopel, Akten des XIV. Internationalen Kongresses für Christliche Archäologie, Wien 19.-26. 9. 1999, Herausgegeben von R. Harreither, Ph. Pergola, R. Pillinger, A. Pulz (Wien, 2006) pp. 301–316.
- Irwin, Raymond. “VII. Cassiodorus Senator.” The Heritage of the English Library. Vol. 1. United Kingdom: Taylor & Francis Group, 2021.
- Rand, E. K. “The New Cassiodorus.” Speculum 13.4 (1938): 433–447.
- Souter, A. “Cassiodorus’ Library at Vivarium: Some Additions." Journal of theological studies os-XLI.161 (1940): 46–47
- Fabio Troncarelli, Vivarium. The books, the fate, Turnhout: Brepols, 1998.
