= Nestorian schism =

Distancing of churches in the Roman Empire and Sassanid Persia

- Spectrum of 5th to 7th century Christological views
- Date: Fifth century – present
- Type: Christian schism
- Cause: Independent ecclesial structures Legacies of Theodore of Mopsuestia and Nestorius; Dispute over whether unity of Christ is hypostatic or prosopic
- Participants: Church of the East; Roman imperial church
- Outcome: Mutual separation of the Church of the East from the Chalcedonian Christianity and Oriental Orthodox Churches

The Nestorian schism was a gradual distancing between the Church of the East in the Sasanian Empire and the state church of the Roman Empire from the fifth century onwards. The Church of the East came to align itself with Theodore of Mopsuestia, and by extension with his student Nestorius, whereas the Roman imperial church condemned Nestorius and Theodore at the Council of Ephesus and Second Council of Constantinople respectively.

== History ==
=== Early centuries ===
From the early centuries, Christian churches in Sassanid Persia developed their own ecclesial structures separate from those of the churches in the Roman Empire, though there was contact between the different churches. The churches in Persia developed into the Church of the East, which centralised and regularised its structure through synods held in 410 and 424.

=== The Councils of Ephesus and Chalcedon ===
A cleric named Nestorius served as the Patriarch of Constantinople from 428 to 431. Prior to becoming Patriarch, Nestorius had been a student of Theodore at the School of Antioch. Nestorius argued that Christ's human and divine natures were distinct, and so he preferred to use the term Christotokos ("Christ bearer") of the Virgin Mary, though he was not opposed to using the term Theotokos (Greek: "God bearer"). Nonetheless, Cyril of Alexandria considered Nestorius' teaching contrary to orthodoxy, and encouraged measures against it. Nestorius and his doctrine were condemned at the First Council of Ephesus in 431, and the condemnation was reiterated at the Council of Chalcedon in 451.

=== Subsequent reception ===
The reception of Theodore, Nestorius, and the Councils of Ephesus and Chalcedon in Syriac-speaking Mesopotamia was complex. During the 430s, the School of Edessa, a major centre of Christian education, was led first by Rabbula and then by Ibas. Rabbula had a negative attitude towards Theodore's works, whereas Ibas had a positive one. Both pro- and anti-Theodorean sentiments were therefore present among Syriac speakers in northern Mesopotamia during the 430s.

The Church of the East, meanwhile, was not party to the synods of the Roman imperial church, so it did not participate in the Councils of Ephesus or Chalcedon. News of the Council of Ephesus may have taken some time to reach the Church of the East. Ibas, Bishop of Edessa in the Roman church, wrote to a Church of the East cleric named Mari in 433 to inform him of what had happened at the council and after it, which suggests that this information had not already reached the Church of the East.

Sabino Chialà has suggested that "in reality, neither the Council of Ephesus nor Nestorius, who was deposed by that council and to whose memory the East Syrian Church is linked, had a direct and decisive influence on Mesopotamian Christianity" in this period.

Strict dyophysite Christology, in the vein of Theodore's theology, continued to be popular at the School of Edessa into the late fifth century. As a result, in 489, Byzantine Emperor Zeno ordered the school to be closed. Some of its scholars moved to Nisibis, within the Sasanian Empire, and continued teaching there.

=== Later centuries ===
What followed was gradual process by which the existing distance between the Roman and Persian churches increased. However, there was no sudden rupture. In the late fifth and early sixth centuries, some Christians who subscribed to the Council of Chalcedon did so "by emphasizing its connection to Diodore and Theodore", and until the 520s and 530s, "the city of Cyrrhus could still hold processions for the Dyophysite fathers", while "some Chalcedonians continued to place heavy emphasis on the connections between Chalcedon and the Antiochene theologians". Meanwhile, the proceedings of a Church of the East synod held in 544 mention the Chalcedon in passing, which suggests that even by the middle of the sixth century, the Church of the East was not especially knowledgeable about or hostile towards Chalcedon.

In later centuries, the Church of the East took a more consciously polemical stance against the Chalcedonian Christology of the Roman church. In the early sixth century, the influential theologian and cleric Babai the Great developed a distinctive East Syrian Christological language of two qnome (ܩܢܘܡܐ) in one parsopa (ܦܪܨܘܦܐ). Philip Wood writes that "the long-term impact of Babai’s assertion of a more extreme Christology and a more marked identification with Nestorius and his slogans is apparent as early as the synod of Giwargis I in 680, which explicitly defends the theology of 'Nestorius and Theodore'".

While there was an amicable embassy between Catholicos Isho'yahb I and Byzantine Emperor Maurice in the 590s, much of the Church of the East remained hostile towards Chalcedonianism. Similarly, in 630, Catholicos Ishoyahb II and Byzantine Emperor Heraclius shared Communion, but again, much of the Church of the East remained hostile to Chalcedonianism and the Roman church, and criticised Ishoyahb. Ishoyahb himself, in spite of sharing Communion, viewed Chalcedon as "neither orthodox nor heretical"; he thought that "it was intended to restore the faith, but slipped away [from its intention] due to feeble phraseology".

By the ninth century, the Church of the East had begun to refer to itself as 'Nestorian', though Theodore remained the most important influence on its theology.

Modern research suggests that the Church of the East in China did not teach a doctrine of two distinct natures of Christ.
