= Junillus =

Byzantine writer

Junillus Africanus (floruit 541–549) was Quaestor of the Sacred Palace (quaestor sacri palatii) in the court of the Byzantine Emperor Justinian I, in this position successor of Tribonian. He is best known for his work on biblical exegesis, Instituta regularia divinae legis. According to M.L.W. Laistner, Junillus' work was based on the writings of one of the teachers of the School of Nisibis, Paul the Persian, and because Paul had been influenced by the writings of Theodore of Mopsuestia, Junillus' Instituta helped make Western theologians familiar with the Antiochene school of exegesis.

Susan Stevens identifies Junillus with a kinsman of the aristocrat Venantia who had the same name; she was a correspondent of Fulgentius of Ruspe, and possibly a member of the gens Decii.
