= Nestorianism =

Umbrella term used for several related but distinct sets of Christian teachings

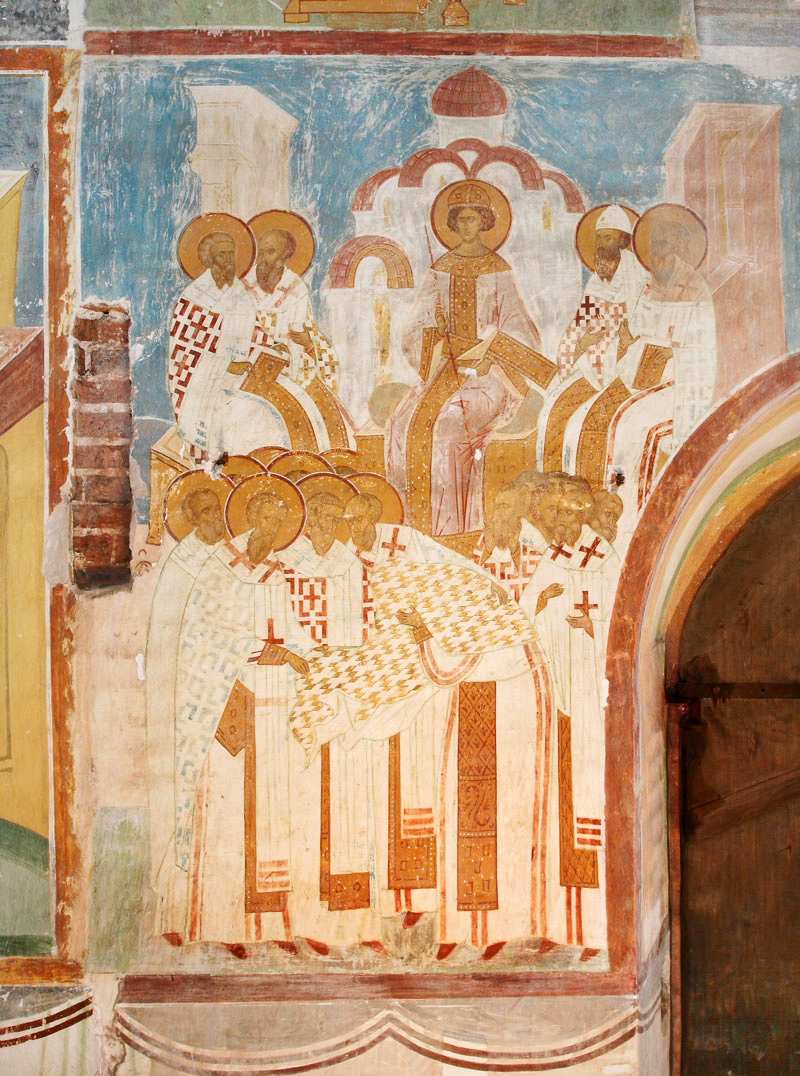
A depiction of Nestorius being defrocked and having his vestments removed at the Council of Ephesus. A 15th-century mural in Ferapontov Monastery.

Nestorianism is a term used in Christian theology and Church history to refer to several mutually related but doctrinally distinct sets of teachings that fall under the umbrella term Dyophysitism, such as two natures in Christ (human and Divine) or two persons in Christ (the Man and the Word). The extent to which those two definitions are actually distinct is also debatable. The first meaning of the term is related to the teachings of Christian theologian Nestorius (died c. AD 451) as according to his immediate opponents at the Council of Ephesus and traditionally used by Miaphysites. The second meaning of the term relates to a set of later theological teachings that were traditionally labeled as Nestorian by Chalcedonians but differ from the teachings of Nestorius in origin, scope and terminology. Per the latter definition, the Oxford English Dictionary defines Nestorianism as:

The doctrine of Nestorius, Patriarch of Constantinople (appointed in 428), by which Christ is asserted to have had distinct human and divine persons.

The original definition of Nestorianism, as articulated by Nestorius himself, is preserved primarily in his surviving writings on topics such as Mariology and Christology. Although many of his works were lost or destroyed, others have been transmitted through his opponents or preserved in Church of the East libraries. Most notable among these is the Bazaar of Heracleides, composed during his exile following the Council of Chalcedon. The modern rediscovery of the Bazaar has prompted renewed scholarly interest in reconstructing Nestorius’s own theological positions, which appear to diverge in significant respects from the "two‐person" formulation of Christology attributed to him by both his contemporaries and later critics. His theology was influenced by teachings of Theodore of Mopsuestia (died 428), the most prominent theologian of the Antiochian School. Nestorian Mariology prefers the title Christotokos, which encompasses the terms Theotokos ('God-bearer') and Anthropotokos ('Man-bearer') for Mary, thus emphasizing distinction between divine and human aspects of the Incarnation, and at the same time their unity in the person of Christ. Nestorian Christology promotes the concept of a prosopic union of two concrete realities (divine and human) in Jesus Christ, as opposed to the concept of a hypostatic union of two hypostases into one. The distinction is between 'two hypostases in one person' and 'two hypostases united into one hypostasis', respectively. Hypostasis is not seen as subject, but rather a nature existing in reality. This Christological position is viewed by the West as radical dyophysitism, and, according to Chalcedonian Christianity, differs from their dyophysitism, which was reaffirmed at the Council of Chalcedon in 451. Such teachings brought Nestorius into conflict with other prominent church leaders, most notably Cyril of Alexandria, who issued 12 anathemas against him in 430. Nestorius and his teachings were eventually condemned as heretical at the Council of Ephesus in 431, and again at the Council of Chalcedon in 451. His teachings were considered as heretical not only in Chalcedonian Christianity, but even more so in Oriental Orthodoxy. The Church of the East would affirm the orthodoxy of Nestorius, lining up with the tradition of the School of Antioch of its time.

After the condemnation, some supporters of Nestorius, who were followers of the Antiochian School and the School of Edessa, relocated to the Sasanian Empire, where they were affiliated with the local Assyrian community of the satrapy of Asuristan (Assyria), many who were followers of the Assyrian Church, known as the Church of the East, while others were Syriac Orthodox. During the period from 484 to 612, gradual development led to the creation of specific doctrinal views within the Church of the East. Evolution of those views was finalized by prominent East Syriac theologian Babai the Great (died 628) who was using the specific Syriac term qnoma (ܩܢܘܡܐ) as a designation for dual (divine and human) substances within one prosopon (person) of Christ. Such views were officially adopted by the Church of the East at a council held in 612.

Opponents of such views in the West inaccurately labeled them as "Nestorian", leading to the practice of mislabeling the Church of the East as Nestorian, and indeed the Assyrian people themselves as "Nestorians". However, in modern religious studies it has been criticized as improper and misleading, even though Nestorius is officially venerated as a saint in the Assyrian Church of the East. As a consequence, both in scholarly literature and in the field of inter-denominational relations, the term Nestorian increasingly focuses on its primary meaning, the original teachings of Nestorius, rather than referring to the teachings of the far older-originating Assyrian Church of the East or its offshoot, the Chaldean Catholic Church.

== History ==
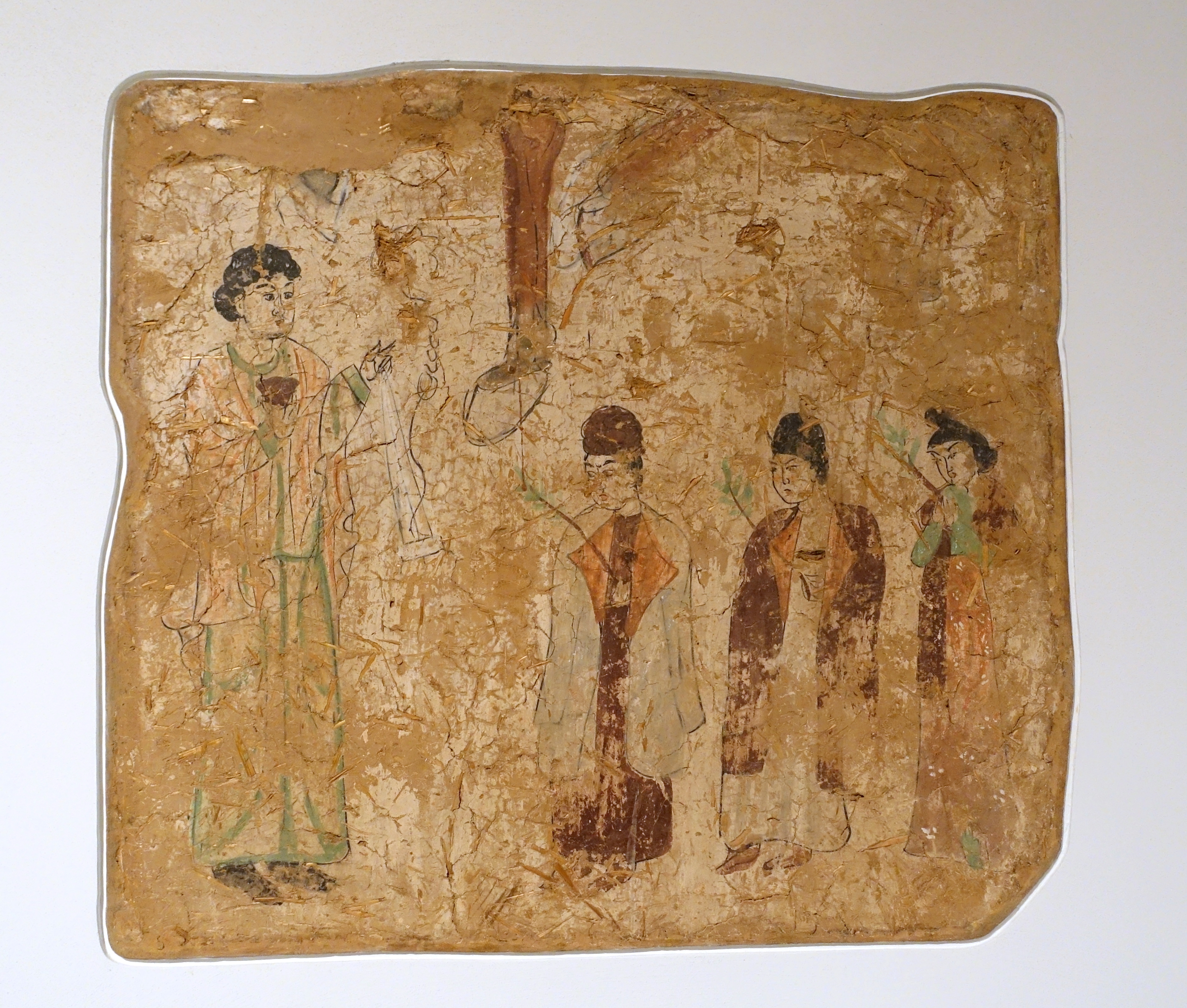
A procession on Palm Sunday, in a seventh- or eighth-century wall painting from a Nestorian church in Qocho, China

Nestorianism was condemned as heresy at the Council of Ephesus (431). The Armenian Church rejected the Council of Chalcedon (451) because they believed Chalcedonian Definition was too similar to Nestorianism. The Persian Nestorian Church, on the other hand, supported the spread of Nestorianism in Persarmenia. The Armenian Church and other eastern churches saw the rise of Nestorianism as a threat to the independence of their Church. Peter the Iberian, a Georgian prince, also strongly opposed the Chalcedonian Creed. Thus, in 491, Catholicos Babken I of Armenia, along with the Albanian and Iberian bishops met in Vagharshapat and issued a condemnation of the Chalcedonian Definition.

Nestorians held that the Council of Chalcedon proved the orthodoxy of their faith and had started persecuting non-Chalcedonian or Miaphysite Syriac Christians during the reign of Peroz I. In response to pleas for assistance from the Syriac Church, Armenian prelates issued a letter addressed to Persian Christians reaffirming their condemnation of the Nestorianism as heresy.

Following the exodus to Persia, scholars expanded on the teachings of Nestorius and his mentors, particularly after the relocation of the School of Edessa to the city of Nisibis under Persian control in 489, where it became known as the School of Nisibis. Nestorian monasteries propagating the teachings of the Nisibis school flourished in 6th century Persarmenia.

Despite this initial Eastern expansion, the Nestorians' missionary success was eventually deterred. David J. Bosch observes, "By the end of the fourteenth century, however, the Nestorian and other churches—which at one time had dotted the landscape of all of Central and even parts of East Asia—were all but wiped out. Isolated pockets of Christianity survived only in India. The religious victors on the vast Central Asian mission field of the Nestorians were Islam and Buddhism".

== Doctrine ==
Christological spectrum during the 5th–7th centuries showing the views of the Church of the East (light blue), the Chalcedonian Churches (light purple), and the Miaphysite Churches (pink)

A historical misinterpretation of the Nestorian view was that it taught that the human and divine persons of Christ are separate.

Nestorianism is described as a radical form of dyophysitism that, according to Chalcedonians, differs from their version of dyophysitism on several points, mainly by opposition to the concept of hypostatic union. It can be seen as the antithesis to Eutychian Monophysitism, which emerged in reaction to Nestorianism after the conclusion of the Council of Ephesus. Where Nestorianism holds that Christ had two distinct natures, divine and human, Monophysitism holds that he had but a single nature, his human nature being absorbed into his divinity. A brief definition of Nestorian Christology can be given as: "Jesus Christ, who is not identical with the Son but personally united with the Son, who lives in him, is one hypostasis and one nature: human." This contrasts with Nestorius' own teaching that the Word, which is eternal, and the Flesh, which is not, came together in a hypostatic union, 'Jesus Christ', Jesus thus being both fully man and God, of two ousia (Ancient Greek: οὐσία) (essences) but of one prosopon (person). Both Nestorianism and Monophysitism were condemned as heretical at the Council of Chalcedon and the Second Council of Ephesus.

Nestorius developed his Christological views as an attempt to understand and explain rationally the incarnation of the divine Logos, the Second Person of the Holy Trinity as the man Jesus. He had studied at the School of Antioch where his mentor had been Theodore of Mopsuestia; Theodore and other Antioch theologians had long taught a literalist interpretation of the Bible and stressed the distinctiveness of the human and divine natures of Jesus. Nestorius took his Antiochene leanings with him when he was appointed Patriarch of Constantinople by Byzantine emperor Theodosius II in 428.

Nestorius's teachings sparked controversy when he publicly challenged the long-established title of Theotokos ('God-Bearer') for the Virgin Mary. He argued that this title, while orthodox per se, was inadequate to fully encompass the nature of the Incarnation, as it singled out Christ's divinity with no reference to His humanity. To address this perceived limitation, he proposed the alternative title of Christotokos ('Christ-Bearer') as a more appropriate designation for Mary.

He also advanced the image of Jesus as a warrior-king and rescuer of Israel over the traditional image of the Christus dolens.

Nestorius' opponents found his teaching too close to the heresy of adoptionism – the idea that Christ had been born a man who had later been "adopted" as God's son. Nestorius was especially criticized by Cyril, Patriarch of Alexandria, who argued that Nestorius's teachings undermined the unity of Christ's divine and human natures at the Incarnation. Some of Nestorius's opponents argued that he put too much emphasis on the human nature of Christ, and others debated that the difference that Nestorius implied between the human nature and the divine nature created a fracture in the singularity of Christ, thus creating two Christ figures. Nestorius himself always insisted that his views were orthodox, though they were deemed heretical at the Council of Ephesus in 431, leading to the Nestorian Schism, when churches supportive of Nestorius and the rest of the Christian Church separated. However, this formulation was never adopted by all churches termed 'Nestorian'. Indeed, the modern Assyrian Church of the East, which reveres Nestorius, does not fully subscribe to Nestorian doctrine, though it does not employ the title Theotokos.

== Intentions ==
As written in his Bazaar of Heracleides, Nestorius went on to qualify his beliefs, including justifying his position, seemingly disconnecting him from the heresy of which bears his name. He would state that he never taught two persons or separated the Savior into two, affirming two natures in one person, that Mary is the mother of God; that Christ is God and Man. And, he "was born in flesh Christ, who is God above all." As John McGuckin says, "For Nestorius, a nature without a hypostasis was a 'phantom.' He used the word to mean the concrete particularity of the nature. His critics, however, read 'hypostasis' as 'Person,' and thus accused him of teaching two Persons when he was actually trying to teach two concrete realities."

Nestorius would live long enough to read and happily agree with the Tome of Leo proclaiming him 'guiltless' and 'truthful' as he articulated the teachings he was trying to express in dyophysitism.

As scholars note, Nestorius was trying to safeguard the distinctions of the two natures against confusion and mixture. For him, a nature without its own hypostasis (or concrete existence) was not a real nature at all. Nestorius defines hypostasis as the concrete reality of the nature, the 'that which' (id quod) of the essence. It is the individual instance which possesses the properties of the nature. ... This is why he insists on two hypostases: to ensure the humanity is not swallowed up.

J.F. Bethune Baker says, "By hypostasis Nestorius means the actual concrete existence of the nature. ... For him, to say that there were two natures but only one hypostasis would have been to say that one of the natures was unreal a mere abstraction."

His Bazaar and teachings following his excommunication would be preserved Mar Babai the Great and the Assyrian Church which would use syriac terminology to express what he meant.

As Mar Babai the Great explains, "A nature (kyānā) which is not composed and does not stand in its own concrete instance (qnōmā) is not a nature at all, but a mere mental concept. ... For if the nature of man in Christ was not a qnōmā, then he did not truly become man, but only appeared to be so." Book of Union, Chapter 1

"The two qnōmē remain distinct in their natural properties, so that the divinity is not changed into humanity, nor the humanity into divinity ... but they are united in the one parṣōpā of the Sonship, so that there is one Son, one Lord, and one Christ." Book of Union, Chapter 4

Sebastian Brock says, "The word qnoma ... does not mean 'person' (for which parsopa is used), but 'an individual instance of a nature' (kyana). Since a nature (kyana) is an abstraction and can only exist in a concrete individual (qnoma), it follows that to speak of two natures is to imply two qnome."

Thus, the Assyrians professed within the Lord Jesus Christ, the Word and Son of God, there exists one Parṣōpā (ܦܪܨܘܦܐ), that is one subject—one person of the incarnate Messiah, there are two Kyānē (ܟܝܵܢܹ̈ܐ) of the one Parṣōpā, that is two natures of the Word of God; there exists the Qnōmē (ܩܢܘܡ̈ܐ), the two real, concrete, and particular instances and realities, united perfectly in the one Parṣōpā. Thus, he professed that the Lord Jesus Christ has two natures (Trēn Kyānē – ܬܪܹܝܢ ܟܝܵܢܹ̈ܐ), two concrete instances and realities (Trēn Qnōmē — ܬܪܹܝܢ ܩܢܘܡ̈ܐ) of the two natures, in one person (Ḥdā Parṣōpā – ܚܕ݂ܵܐ ܦܪܨܘܦܐ). Summarizing the teachings of Nestorius, who would himself later understand Cyril was not trying to mix but unite the natures to preserve the indivisibility of the incarnate Christ.

Nestorius's posthumous victory would be eminent within the Tome of Leo which states Agit enim utraque forma ("Each form [nature] does what is proper to it") and that one form suffers and the other sprinkles miracles. This would be seen as a concession to the dual-subject terminology and the antiochene theology Nestorius and Theodore of Mopsuestia stressed in their teachings by many, as noted by many scholars.

This would be prevalent in the Church up until the condemnation of homo assumptus by Thomas Aquinas, who rejected the idea that the human 'hypostasis' was assumed by a divine one. Nevertheless, scholars agree that, in correcting the enhypostaton language used by John Damascene, the scholastics would still concede to the individualistic language used for the human nature. In the De Unione, Aquinas suggests that there is a secondary esse. This looked very much like the Nestorian view that there were two concrete beings (hypostases) in Christ. The difference is largely one of terminology: what Nestorius calls a hypostasis, the scholastics call a particular substance. As Richard Cross says, "The account of the union according to which the human nature is an individual substance an account that was, as we have seen, standard among the thirteenth century high scholastics is structurally very similar to the account offered by Nestorius... Both accounts require that there be two concrete particulars in Christ, one divine and one human." The later Latin scholastics, in their effort to maintain the integrity and reality of the human nature, ended up affirming a 'particularity' that is indistinguishable from the Nestorian hypostasis.

By the time of Aquinas, the 'two-natures' doctrine had become so robust that it required what was essentially a Nestorian metaphysics of two concrete beings in one person. As Thomas Joseph White says, "Aquinas’s later teaching in the De unione... acknowledges a created esse for the humanity. This risks positing Christ as two 'things' (res) in a way that the Summa avoids. It brings him closer to a model where the humanity is a complete particular entity existing in the Word."

Going back to the semantics, the abovementioned scholars note that Leo managed to bypass the two persons baggage and limitations of the Greek, and provided a clarity through Latin persona and substantia. Moreover, the Syriac terminology expressed their (and by proxy Nestiorius's) theology and emphasis on the distinctness of the distinct natural properties, much like Cyril of Alexandria in his dialogue with the Antiochene school; in the reunion formula and second letter to Succensus.

Cyril in his second letter to Succensus says, "If the same one is understood to be perfect God and perfect man... then how can there be a perfection if the nature of man no longer endures? ... each [essence] is understood to remain in all its natural characteristics."

Cyril in his letter to John of Antioch (Laetentur Caeli | 433 A.D.) says, "As to the evangelical and apostolic expressions concerning the Lord, we know that theologians treat some as common, as referring to one person, and distinguish others as referring to two natures, and they deliver the God-befitting ones to the divinity of Christ, but the humble ones to his humanity."

Nestorius’s use of hypostasis was intended to guarantee the ontological permanence of the two natures... He feared that if there were only 'one hypostasis' after the union, one of the natures (likely the human) would be absorbed or swallowed up by the other. He insisted on two hypostases because he believed that a nature (physis) cannot exist in the abstract; it must have a concrete, individual expression. By 'two hypostases,' he meant that the divinity remained divine and the humanity remained human even after they were joined.

As scholars would explain regarding the Nestorian controversy, Nestorius was a defender of the antiochene (dyophysite) theology, expressing the distinctness of the two natures of Christ, albeit audaciously. Whose religious and political disputes with the Alexandrians caused as scholars call it 'a linguistic tragedy of miscommunication.' Teaching that there exists two natures and two hypostases (concrete existents) within the one person of Jesus Christ.

== Nestorian Schism ==
Nestorianism became a distinct sect following the Nestorian Schism, beginning in the 430s. Nestorius had come under fire from Western theologians, most notably Cyril of Alexandria. Cyril had both theological and political reasons for attacking Nestorius; on top of feeling that Nestorianism was an error against true belief, he also wanted to denigrate the head of a competing patriarchate. Cyril and Nestorius asked Pope Celestine I to weigh in on the matter. Celestine found that the title Theotokos was sufficiently orthodox, and authorized Cyril to ask Nestorius to recant. Cyril, however, used the opportunity to further attack Nestorius, who pleaded with Emperor Theodosius II to call a council so that all grievances could be aired.

In 431 Theodosius II called the Council of Ephesus. The council ultimately sided with Cyril, who held that the Christ is of (not in) two natures (hypostases) perfectly united into one nature (hypostasis) without mixture or separation, and that the Virgin Mary, conceiving and bearing this divine person, is truly and sufficiently called the Mother of God (Theotokos). The council accused Nestorius of heresy, and deposed him as patriarch. Upon returning to his monastery in 436, he was banished to Upper Egypt. Nestorianism was officially anathematized, a ruling reiterated at the Council of Chalcedon in 451. However, a number of churches, particularly those associated with the School of Edessa, supported Nestorius – though not necessarily his doctrine – and broke with the churches of the West. Many of Nestorius' supporters relocated to the Sasanian Empire of Iran, home to a vibrant but persecuted Christian minority. In Upper Egypt, Nestorius wrote his Book of Heraclides, responding to the two councils at Ephesus (431, 449).

=== Christian denomination tree ===

(Not shown are ante-Nicene, nontrinitarian, and restorationist denominations.)

== Church of the East ==
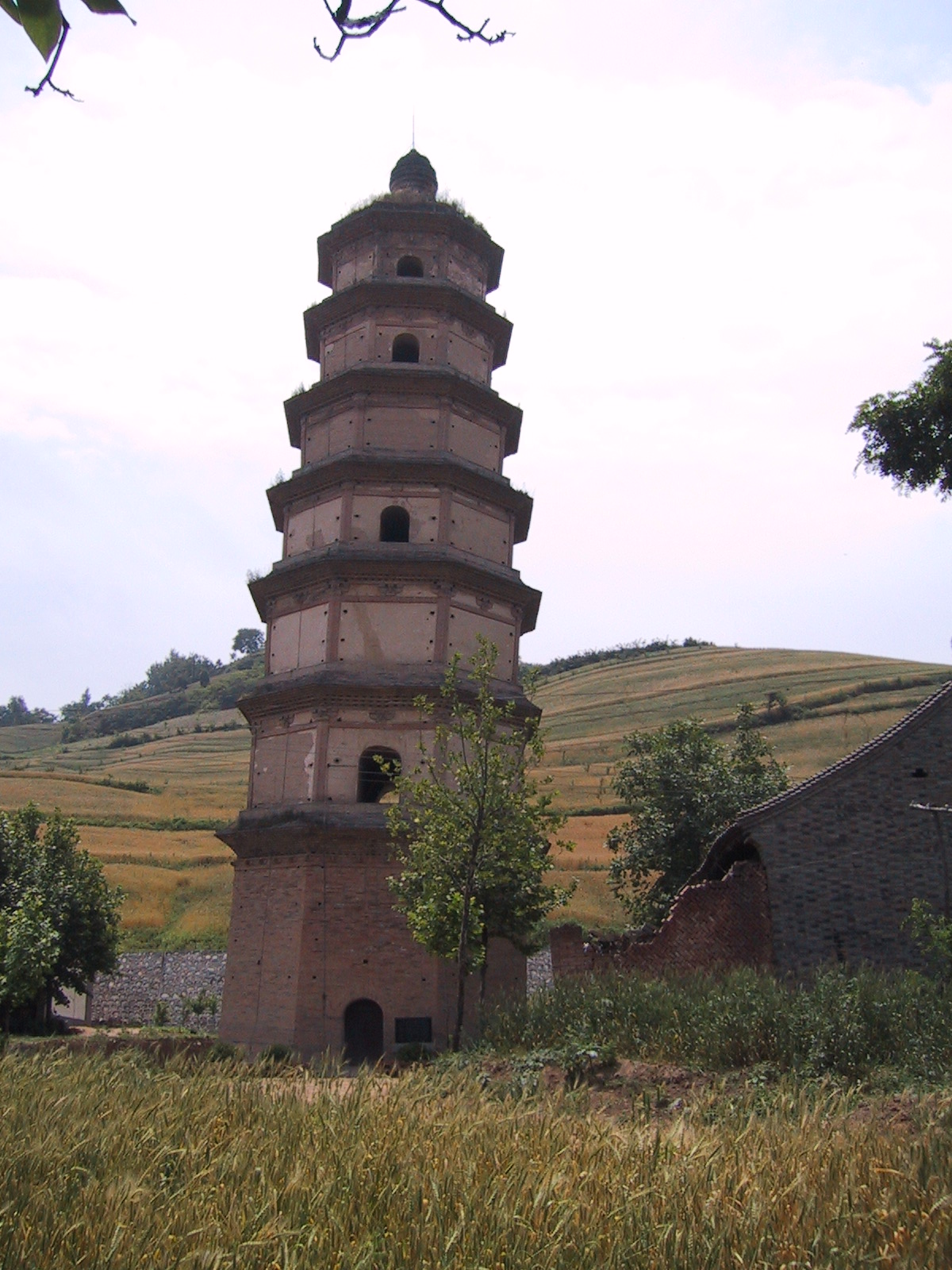
The Daqin Pagoda, controversially claimed to be part of an early Nestorian church in what was then Chang'an, now Xi'an, China, built during the Tang dynasty (AD 618–907)

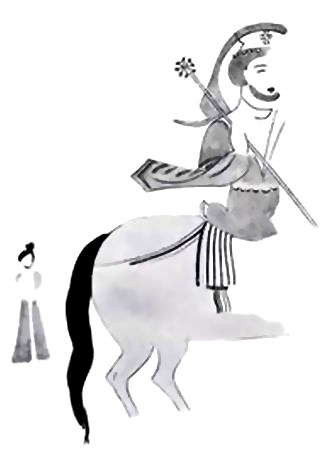
Entry of Jesus Christ into Jerusalem, with a female figure dressed in a Tang dynasty costume, AD 683–770

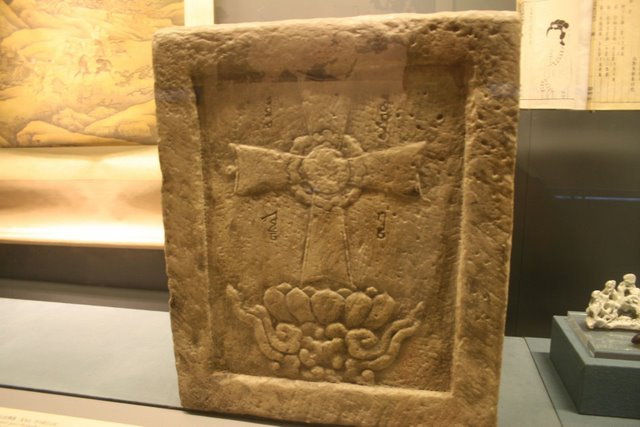
Chinese stone inscription of a Nestorian Cross from a monastery of Fangshan District in Beijing (then called Dadu, or Khanbaliq), dated to the Yuan Dynasty (AD 1271–1368) of medieval China

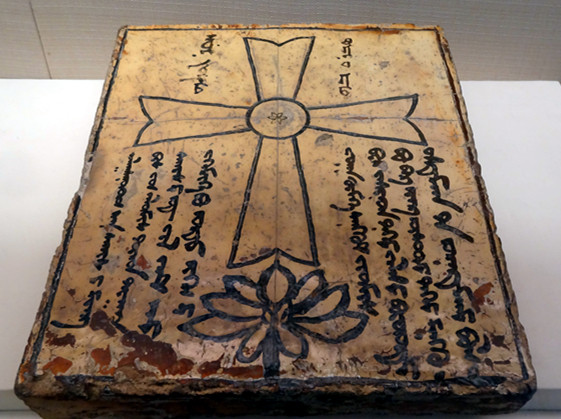
Epitaph of a Nestorian, unearthed at Chifeng, Inner Mongolia

The western provinces of the Persian Empire had been home to Christian communities, headed by metropolitans, and later patriarchs of Seleucia-Ctesiphon. The Christian minority in Persia was frequently persecuted by the Zoroastrian majority, which accused local Christians of political leanings towards the Roman Empire. In 424, the Church in Persia declared itself independent, in order to ward off allegations of any foreign allegiance. By the end of the 5th century, the Persian Church increasingly aligned itself with the teachings of Theodore of Mopsuestia and his followers, many of whom became dissidents after the Councils of Ephesus (431) and Chalcedon (451). The Persian Church became increasingly opposed to doctrines promoted by those councils, thus furthering the divide between Chalcedonian and Persian currents.

In 486, the Metropolitan Barsauma of Nisibis publicly accepted Nestorius' mentor Theodore of Mopsuestia as a spiritual authority. In 489, when the School of Edessa in Mesopotamia was closed by Byzantine Emperor Zeno for its pro-Nestorian teachings, the school relocated to its original home of Nisibis, becoming again the School of Nisibis, leading to the migration of a wave of Christian dissidents into Persia. The Persian patriarch Babai (497–502) reiterated and expanded upon the church's esteem for Theodore of Mopsuestia.

Now firmly established in Persia, with centers in Nisibis, Ctesiphon, and Gundeshapur, and several metropoleis, the Persian Church began to branch out beyond the Sasanian Empire. However, through the sixth century, the church was frequently beset with internal strife and persecution by Zoroastrians. The infighting led to a schism, which lasted from 521 until around 539 when the issues were resolved. However, immediately afterward Roman-Persian conflict led to the persecution of the church by the Sassanid emperor Khosrow I; this ended in 545. The church survived these trials under the guidance of Patriarch Aba I, who had converted to Christianity from Zoroastrianism.

The church emerged stronger after this period of ordeal, and increased missionary efforts farther afield. Missionaries established dioceses in the Arabian Peninsula and India (the Saint Thomas Christians). They made some advances in Egypt, despite the strong Miaphysite presence there. Missionaries entered Central Asia and had significant success converting local Turkic tribes.

The Anuradhapura Cross discovered in Sri Lanka strongly suggests a strong presence of Nestorian Christianity in Sri Lanka during the 6th century AD according to Humphrey Codrington, who based his claim on a 6th-century manuscript, Christian Topography, that mentions of a community of Persian Christians who were known to reside in Taprobanê (the Ancient Greek name for Sri Lanka).

Nestorian missionaries were firmly established in China during the early part of the Tang dynasty (618–907); the Chinese source known as the Nestorian Stele records a mission under a Persian proselyte named Alopen as introducing Nestorian Christianity to China in 635. The Jingjiao Documents (also described by the Japanese scholar P. Y. Saeki as "Nestorian Documents") or Jesus Sutras are said to be connected with Alopen.

Following the Arab conquest of Persia, completed in 644, the Persian Church became a dhimmi community under the Rashidun Caliphate. The church and its communities abroad grew larger under the caliphate. By the 10th century it had 15 metropolitan sees within the caliphate's territories, and another five elsewhere, including in China and India. After that time, however, Nestorianism went into decline.

=== Assyrian Church of the East ===
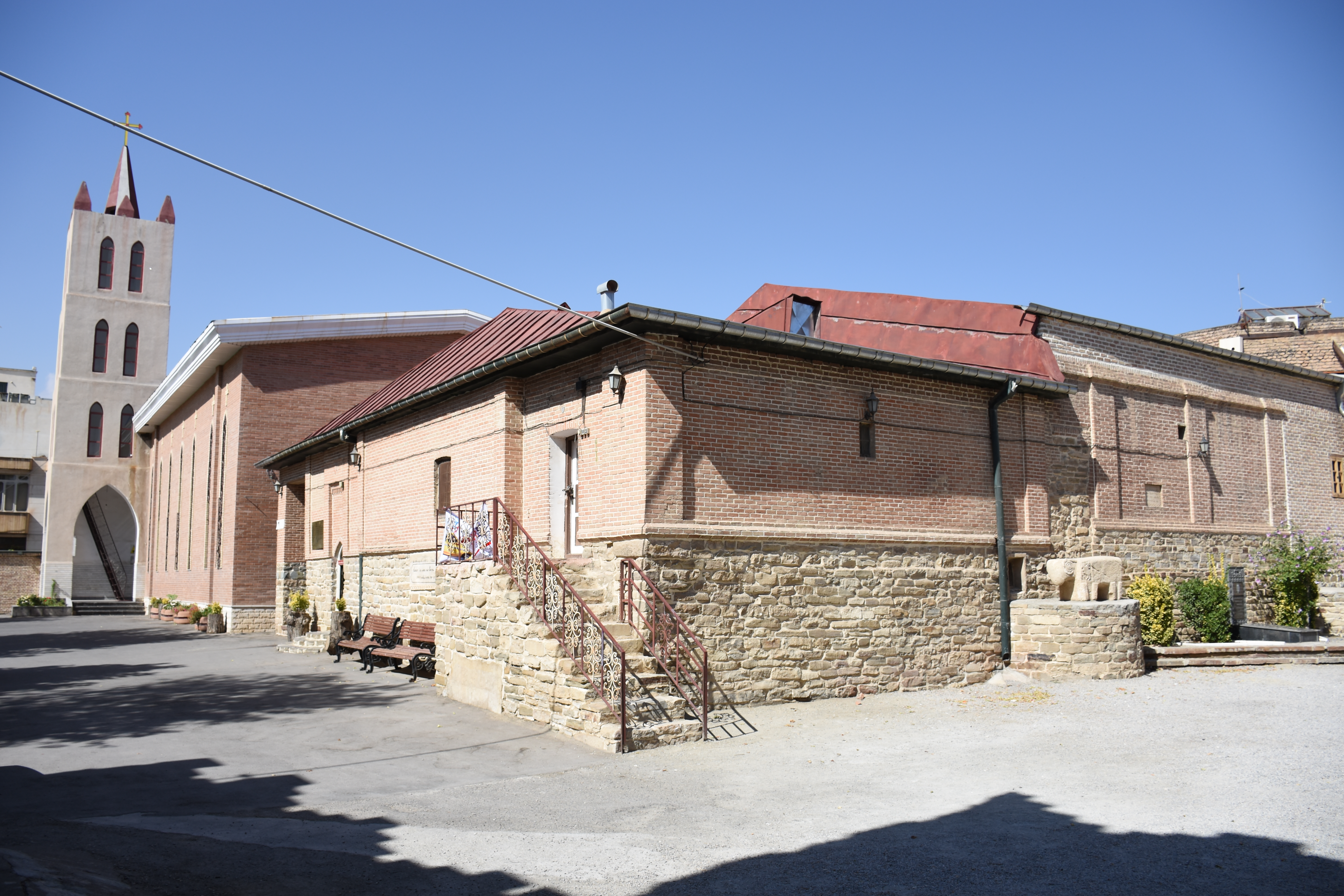
Saint Mary Church: an ancient Assyrian church located in the city of Urmia, West Azerbaijan Province, Iran

In a 1996 article published in the Bulletin of the John Rylands Library, Fellow of the British Academy Sebastian Brock wrote: "the term 'Nestorian Church' has become the standard designation for the ancient oriental church which in the past called itself 'The Church of the East', but which today prefers the fuller title 'The Assyrian Church of the East'. The Common Christological Declaration between the Catholic Church and the Assyrian Church of the East signed by Pope John Paul II and Mar Dinkha IV underlines the Chalcedonian Christological formulation as the expression of the common faith of these Churches and recognizes the legitimacy of the title Theotokos."

In a 2017 paper, Mar Awa Royel, Bishop of the Assyrian Church, stated the position of that church: "After the Council of Ephesus (431), when Nestorius the patriarch of Constantinople was condemned for his views on the unity of the Godhead and the humanity in Christ, the Church of the East was branded as 'Nestorian' on account of its refusal to anathematize the patriarch."

Several historical records suggest that the Assyrian Church of the East may have been in Sri Lanka between the mid-5th and 6th centuries.

== See also ==
- Nestorius
- Miaphysitism
- Monophysitism
- Hypostatic union
- Nestorian Evangelion
- Nestorianism and the church in India
- Christian influences in Islam

== Bibliography ==
- Badger, George Percy (1852). The Nestorians and Their Rituals. Vol. 1. London: Joseph Masters – via Google Books.
- Badger, George Percy (1852). The Nestorians and Their Rituals. Vol. 2. London: Joseph Masters. ISBN 9780790544823 – via Google Books.
- Baum, Wilhelm; Winkler, Dietmar W. (2003). The Church of the East: A Concise History. London & New York: Routledge-Curzon. ISBN 9781134430192 – via Google Books.
- Bethune-Baker, James F. (1908). Nestorius and His Teaching: A Fresh Examination of the Evidence. Cambridge: Cambridge University Press. ISBN 9781107432987 – via Google Books.
- Brock, Sebastian P. (1996). "The 'Nestorian' Church: A Lamentable Misnomer" (PDF). Bulletin of the John Rylands Library. 78 (3): 23–35. doi:10.7227/BJRL.78.3.3. Archived from the original (PDF) on 2023-03-06.
- Brock, Sebastian P. (1999). "The Christology of the Church of the East in the Synods of the Fifth to Early Seventh Centuries: Preliminary Considerations and Materials". Doctrinal Diversity: Varieties of Early Christianity. New York & London: Garland Publishing. pp. 281–298. ISBN 9780815330714 – via Google Books.
- Brock, Sebastian P. (2006). Fire from Heaven: Studies in Syriac Theology and Liturgy. Aldershot: Ashgate Publishing. ISBN 9780754659082 – via Google Books.
- Burgess, Stanley M. (1989). The Holy Spirit: Eastern Christian Traditions. Peabody, Mass.: Hendrickson Publishers. ISBN 9780913573815 – via Google Books.
- Chabot, Jean-Baptiste (1902). Synodicon orientale ou recueil de synodes nestoriens [Eastern Synodicon or Compendium of Nestorian Synods] (PDF) (in French). Paris: Imprimerie Nationale.
- Chesnut, Roberta C. (1978). "The Two Prosopa in Nestorius' Bazaar of Heracleides". The Journal of Theological Studies. 29 (29): 392–409. doi:10.1093/jts/XXIX.2.392. JSTOR 23958267.
- Hill, Henry, ed. (1988). Light from the East: A Symposium on the Oriental Orthodox and Assyrian Churches. Toronto: Anglican Book Centre. ISBN 9780919891906 – via Google Books.
- Hodgson, Leonard; Driver, Godfrey R., eds. (1925). Nestorius: The Bazaar of Heracleides. Oxford: Clarendon Press. ISBN 9781725202399 – via Google Books.
- Jugie, Martin (1935). "L'ecclésiologie des Nestoriens" [The ecclesiology of the Nestorians] (PDF). Échos d'Orient (in French). 34 (177): 5–25. doi:10.3406/rebyz.1935.2817.
- Kuhn, Michael F. (2019). God is One: A Christian Defence of Divine Unity in the Muslim Golden Age. Carlisle: Langham Publishing. ISBN 9781783685776 – via Google Books.
- Meyendorff, John (1989). Imperial unity and Christian divisions: The Church 450–680 A.D. Crestwood, NY: St. Vladimir's Seminary Press. ISBN 9780881410563 – via Google Books.
- Reinink, Gerrit J. (2009). "Tradition and the Formation of the 'Nestorian' Identity in Sixth- to Seventh-Century Iraq". Church History and Religious Culture. 89 (1–3): 217–250. doi:10.1163/187124109X407916. JSTOR 23932289.
- Rossabi, Morris (1992). Voyager from Xanadu: Rabban Sauma and the first journey from China to the West. Kodansha International Ltd. ISBN 4770016506.
- Seleznyov, Nikolai N. (2010). "Nestorius of Constantinople: Condemnation, Suppression, Veneration: With special reference to the role of his name in East-Syriac Christianity". Journal of Eastern Christian Studies. 62 (3–4): 165–190.
- Stewart, John (1928). Nestorian missionary enterprise, the story of a church on fire. Edinburgh: T. & T. Clark.
- Wigram, William Ainger (1910). An Introduction to the History of the Assyrian Church or The Church of the Sassanid Persian Empire 100–640 A.D. London: Society for Promoting Christian Knowledge. ISBN 9780837080789.
- Wilmshurst, David (2000). The Ecclesiastical Organisation of the Church of the East, 1318–1913. Louvain: Peeters Publishers. ISBN 9789042908765.
- Wilmshurst, David (2011). The martyred Church: A History of the Church of the East. London: East & West Publishing Limited. ISBN 9781907318047.
- Luise Abramowski, "Der Bischof von Seleukia-Ktesiphon als Katholikos und Patriarch der Kirche des Ostens," in Dmitrij Bumazhnov u. Hans R. Seeliger (hg), Syrien im 1.–7. Jahrhundert nach Christus. Akten der 1. Tübinger Tagung zum Christlichen Orient (15.–16. Juni 2007). (Tübingen, Mohr Siebeck, 2011) (Studien und Texte zu Antike und Christentum / Studies and Texts in Antiquity and Christianity, 62)
- Leonard, Pinto (2013). "A Brief History of Christianity In Sri Lanka".
