= Drustbed =

Chief physician in Sasanian Iran

Drustbed was the title of the chief physician in Sasanian Iran (224–651). No mention of the title is made in the early Sasanian period, and all the known holders of the title first lived in the late Sasanian era, which implies that this title was presumably a late Sasanian invention.

Non-Zoroastrians were able to obtain the rank, such as the Christian Gabriel of Sinjar, who served as the private physician of Khosrow II (r. 590–628).

== Sources ==
- Tafazzoli, Ahmad (1996). "Drustbed". Encyclopaedia Iranica, Vol. VII, Fasc. 6. pp. 564–565.
