= Narsai =

6th-century Syriac poet

Saint Narsai
- Born: c. 399 ‘Ain Dulba (ܥܝܢ ܕܘܠܒܐ) (modern-day Iraq)
- Died: c. 502; Nisibis, Sassanid Empire (modern-day Nusaybin, Mardin, Turkey)
- Venerated in: Roman Catholic Church; Assyrian Church of the East; Ancient Church of the East; Syro Malabar Church; Chaldean Catholic Church
- Feast: 30 January (Church of the East)

Narsai the Harp of the Holy Spirit (Classical Syriac: ܡܪܝ ܢܪܣܝ ܟܢܪܐ ܕܪܘܚܐ, romanized: Mar Narsai Kinnara d'Rukha, c. 399 – c. 502) was one of the most important poet-theologians of the early Church of the East. His homilies belong to the same late antique Syriac preaching culture as those of Jacob of Serugh and Isaac of Antioch, but they reflect the traditions associated with the School of Edessa, the School of Nisibis, and the writings of Theodore of Mopsuestia. His stature in Syriac literature is seen as on par with Jacob's, both only second to Ephrem the Syrian.

Narsai is venerated as a saint in all the modern descendants of the Church of the East; the Chaldean Catholic Church, Assyrian Church of the East, Ancient Church of the East, and Syro-Malabar Catholic Church. Saint Narsai is known as the 'Flute of the Holy Spirit.'

Although many of his works seem to have been lost, eighty-one of his mēmrē (ܡܐܡܖ̈ܐ), or verse homilies survive.

== Etymology ==
The name Narsai is believed to be derived from Middle Persian Narsēh, which in turn is from Avestan Nairyō.saȵhō, meaning 'potent utterance'.

== Life ==
Narsai was born at ‘Ain Dulba (ܥܝܢ ܕܘܠܒܐ "Plane Tree Spring") in the district of Ma‘alləta (ܡܥܠܬܐ) in the Sasanian Empire (now in Duhok Governorate, Iraq). Being orphaned at an early age, he was raised by his uncle, who was head of the monastery of Kfar Mari (ܕܝܪܐ ܕܟܦܪ ܡܪܝ) near Beth Zabdai (ܒܝܬ ܙܒܕܝ). Narsai spent ten years as a student at the School of Edessa and later returned there to teach (c. 437), eventually becoming head of the school.

Narsai was a follower of the work of Theodore of Mopsuestia. Perhaps in 471, Narsai left Edessa after disagreeing with the city's bishop Cyrus (471–498). With the help of his friend Barsauma, who was bishop of Nisibis (although Narsai and Barsauma's wife do not seem to have seen eye-to-eye), Narsai re-established the School of Nisibis. When his former school was ordered closed by Byzantine emperor Zeno in 489, it seems that many of his faithful staff and students came to join Narsai in Nisibis. Evidence from the first Statutes of the School of Nisibis, drafted in 496, shows that Narsai was still alive, and he must have been a venerable old teacher in his nineties. Narsai died sometime early in the sixth century and was buried in Nisibis in a church that was later named after him. Joseph Huzaya was one of his pupils.

Narsai's extant works belong to the distinctive Syriac literary genre of the mēmrā, or homily in verse. He employs two different metres - one with couplets of seven syllables per line, the other with twelve. The mêmrê were designed to be recited in church or religious school, each an exposition of a particular theme. The later Syriac writer Abdisho bar Berika of Nisibis suggests that Narsai wrote 360 mēmrē in twelve volumes along with prose commentaries on large sections of the Old Testament and a book entitled On the Corruption of Morals. However, only eighty mēmrē remain, and none of his prose works.

== Theology and preaching ==
Several of Narsai's festal homilies, including those on the Nativity, Epiphany, Passion, Resurrection, and Ascension, contain extended Christological reflection. Philip Michael Forness notes that these homilies suggest that, in the mid- to late fifth century, Narsai was presenting detailed Christological teaching in sermons that may have been delivered before broad liturgical audiences. His Christology is usually read within the Dyophysite tradition of the Church of the East, in contrast to the Miaphysite Christology associated with Jacob of Serugh and later Syriac Orthodox writers.

Late antique sources also remembered Narsai's homilies as instruments of doctrinal controversy. According to Barhadbshabba Arbaya, Jacob of Serugh composed attractive metrical homilies that drew ordinary people away from Narsai's teaching, and Narsai responded by composing his own "orthodox" homilies in the same poetic medium. Forness cautions that this account should not be taken as a straightforward historical report, but argues that it preserves the perception that Syriac metrical homilies were understood as media through which theological conflict could and the transmission of doctrine could take place.

== Works and transmission ==
The corpus attributed to Narsai consists primarily of metrical homilies, or mēmrē, on biblical, liturgical, doctrinal, and moral subjects. The major Syriac edition by Alphonse Mingana contains the full text of forty-seven homilies and the incipits of thirty-four others. Later tradition credited Narsai with composing a homily for each day of the year and arranging them into twelve volumes. Forness treats this tradition cautiously, but notes that it reflects the importance attached to Narsai's homilies as a collected body of teaching.

== Homilies ==
Hundreds of works have been attributed to Narsai, but only 81 of his homilies (mēmrē) have survived. The corpus attributed to Narsai consists primarily of metrical homilies, or mēmrē, on biblical, liturgical, doctrinal, and moral subjects. His extraordinary literary production was written about by the next generation of Syriac authors, such as Barhadbshabba Arbaya, who wrote:

For each day in the year, he [Narsai] composed one homily. He divided them into twelve volumes, of which each had two prophets [i.e., divisions], which all amounted to twenty-four prophets.”

Narsai's surviving homilies cover a wide range of subjects. Some expound major feasts of the liturgical year, while others treat biblical figures and episodes such as Adam and Eve, Noah, the Tower of Babel, Joseph, Moses, Samson, and the Three Youths in the furnace. Others address sacramental and ecclesiastical themes, including baptism, the Eucharist, priesthood, the church, and the sanctification of the altar. The range of the corpus shows Narsai's importance not only as a controversial theologian, but also as an exegete, liturgical interpreter, and moral teacher within the East Syriac tradition.

Some surviving sogitha are also attributed to Narsai, but they are considered spurious.

The homilies are all poetry, and most use 12-syllable metre, with a minority using 7-syllable meter. Most, if not all, of Narsai's homilies involve biblical exegesis across liturgical, moral, and theological subjects.

=== Editions and translations ===
In 1905, Alphonse Mingana published a two-volume work with the Syriac text of 47 of these homilies. In 1970, a photographic reproduction of a manuscript with 72 of Narsai's homilies was published by Patriarchal Press. Two numbering systems are used for Narsai's homilies: one by Mingana, and a second by Macomber, in his 1970 inventory of Narsai's manuscripts.

Narsai’s work continues to be published and translated in the 2020s.

== List of Narsai's homilies ==
Name	Number (Macomber)	Number (Mingana)	Translations	Additional notes
On Revelations to Patriarchs and Prophets (I)	1	1	English	
On Revelations to Patriarchs and Prophets (II)	2	2		
On Revelations to Abraham	3	3	English	
On the Nativity	4	-	English	
On Mary (On the Incarnation)	5	-	English	
On Epiphany	6	-	English	
On John the Baptist	7	-	English	
On Peter and Paul	8	4	English German	
On the Four Evangelists	9	-		
On Stephen	10	5	English	
On the Three Doctors	11	-	French	
On the Iniquity of the World	12	6	English	
On Supplication (On Prayer)	13	7	English	
On Jonah	14	8	English	
On Reproof	15	9		
On Human Nature	16	16	English	
For Any Saints Day	17	-		
On the Departed and the Resurrection	18	-	French	
On Works	19	-		
On Lent I	20	10	English	
On the Temptation of Christ (1)	21	-	English	
On the Temptation of Christ (2)	22	-		
On Lent III	23	11	English	
On Lent IV	24	12	English	
On Reproof	25	13	English	
On Lent V	26	14	English	
On the Parable of the Ten Virgins	27	15	French	
On the Raising of Lazarus	28	-		
On Palm Sunday (1)	29	-		
On Palm Sunday (2)	30	-		
Against the Jews	31	18	Italian	
On the Canaanite Women	32	-	English	
On the Prodigal Son	33	-	French	
On Holy Week	34	19		
On the Mysteries	35	17	English French	Probable forgery
On the Passion	36	-	McLeod	
On the Repentant Thief	37	20	English	
On Mysteries and Baptism	38	21	English French	
On Baptism	39	22	English French	
On the Resurrection	40	-	McLeod	
On the Confessors	41	24		
On the Martyrs (1)	42	25		
On the Martyrs (2)	43	-		Probable forgery
On New Sunday (On the New Creation)	44	26	English	
On the Ascension	45	-	McLeod	
On Pentecost	46	27		
On the Workers in the Vineyard	47	28	French	
On the Rich Man and Lazarus	48	28	French	
On Creation IV (On the Forming of Adam and Eve)	49	29	English French	
On Humility	50	-		
On the Antichrist	51	23		
On the Second Coming	52	23	French	
On the Wheat and the Tares	53	-	French	
On the Finding of the Cross	54	30		
On the Bronze Serpent	55	-	English	
On the Dedication of the Church	56	-		
On the Tabernacle	57	-	English	
On Isaiah's Vision	58	31	English	
On the Church and the Priesthood	59	32	English	
On the Dedication of the Church	60	33	English German	
On Creation II	61	34	French	
On Creation III	62	35	English French	
On Creation I	63	36	French	
On Creation V	64	37	French	
On Creation VI	65	38	French German	
On the Soul	66	39	German	
On the Blessing of Noah	67	-	English	
On the Tower of Babel	68	-	English	
On Job	69	40		
On Joseph	70	41		
On the Flood	71	-	English	
On the Miracles of Moses	72	42		
On Samson	73	43		
On David and Saul	74	-		
On Solomon	75	-		
On Enoch and Elijah	76	-	English	
On the Three Children	77	44		
On Reproof of the Clergy	78	45	English	
On Reproof	79	46	English	
On Reproof of Women	80	47	English	
On John 1:14 (On Christology)	81	-	English	
On the Feast of the Victorious Cross	82			
(Title Unknown)	83			
(Title Unknown)	84			

== Syriac editions ==
- Major collection of Narsai's works, containing the full text of 47 memre and the incipits of 34 more - Mingana, Alphonse (1905). Narsai Doctoris Syri Homiliæ et Carmina (in Syriac and Latin). Mosul.

== Published translations ==
=== English ===
- Becker, Adam (2026). Narsai: The Homilies. Volume 2. Peeters Publishers.
- Butts, Aaron; Heal, Kristian; Kitchen, Robert, eds. (2024). Narsai: The Homilies: Volume 1. Peeters.
- Connolly, Dom R.H. (1909). The liturgical homilies of Narsai. Cambridge University Press.
  - Four mēmrē on baptism and eucharist
- Frishman, Judith (1992). The ways and means of the divine economy : an edition, translation and study of six biblical homilies by Narsai (PhD thesis). Leiden University.
- Harrak, Amir (2018). Mar Narsai: Homily 33 on the Sanctification of the Church. Gorgias Press.
- Kuzhuppil, Thomas (2006). The Vision of the Prophet Isaiah: A Theological Study of Narsai's Interpretation of Isaiah 6. Institutum Patristicum Augustinianum.
- McLeod, Frederick G., ed. (1979). Narsai's metrical homilies on the Nativity, Epiphany, Passion, Resurrection, and Ascension: critical edition of Syrica text. François Graffin. Turnhout: Brepols.
  - Five mēmrē on dominical feasts - Christmas, Epiphany, Passion of Jesus, Easter, and Ascension of Jesus - these show Narsai's christological opposition to Cyril of Alexandria in a few places
- Molenberg, Corrie (1993). "Narsai's Memra on the Reproof of Eve's Daughters and the 'Tricks and Devices' they Perform". Le Muséon. 106 (1–2): 65–87.
- Walters, J. Edward (2021). Eastern Christianity: A Reader. Eerdmans.
- Younan, Andrew, ed. (2024). Narsai: Selected Sermons. Paulist Press.

=== French ===
- Brouwers (1965). "Premier poème de Narsaï sur le Baptême". Mélanges de l'Université Saint-Joseph. 41: 177–207.
- Delly, E. (1959). "Le 23e 'Memra' de Narsai". Divinitas. 3: 514–553.
- Frishmann, J., ed. (1992). Narsai's Memre on Old testament Topics. University of Leiden (dissertation).
  - Six mēmrē on Old Testament topics - on Enoch and Elijah, the Genesis flood narrative, Blessings of Noah, the Tower of Babel, the Tabernacle, and the Nehushtan
- Martin, F (1900). "Homélie de Narsaï sur les trois Docteurs". Journal Asiatique. 15: 469–525. Archived from the original on December 21, 2006.
  - Memra on the Three Doctors (Diodorus of Tarsus, Nestorius, and Theodore of Mopsuestia)
- Guillaumont, Antoine (1956). "Poème de Narsaï sur le baptême". L'Orient Syrian. 1 (2): 189–207.
- Gignoux, Philippe, ed. (1968). Homélies de Narsaï sur la création: Édition critique du texte syriaque. Patrologia Orientalis 34, fasc. 3–4 (in French). Turnhout/Paris: Brepols.
  - Six mēmrē on creation
- Gignoux, Philippe (1962). "Homélie de Narsai sur la création d'Adam et d'Eve et sur la transgression du commandement". L'Orient Syrian. 7: 307–336.
- Gignoux, Philippe (1962b). "Homélie de Narsai sur la création du monde". L'Orient Syrian. 7: 477–506.
- Gignoux, Philippe (1963). "Sur les mystères de l'église et sur le baptême". In Hamman, A. (ed.). L'Initiation chrétienne. Bernard Grasset. pp. 195–213.
- Gignoux, Philippe (1963b). "Sur l'exposition des mystères". In Hamman, A. (ed.). L'Initiation chrétienne. Bernard Grasset. pp. 214–247.
- Gignoux, Philippe (1963c). "Homélie de Narsai sur le mot 'au commencement' et sur I'Essence divine". L'Orient Syrian. 8: 227–250.
- Gignoux, Philippe (1966). "Les doctrines eschatologiques de Narsai". L'Orient Syrian. 11: 321–352, 461–488.
- Gignoux, Philippe (1967). "Les doctrines eschatologiques de Narsai". L'Orient Syrian. 12: 23–54.
- Kruger, Paul (1958). "Traduction et commentaire de l'homélie de Narsaï sur les martyrs. Contribution à l'étude du culte des martyrs dans le nestorianisme primitif". L'Orient Syrien. 3: 299–316.
- Siman, Emmanuel Pataq, ed. (1984). Cinq homélies sur les paraboles évangéliques (in French). Paris: Cariscript.
  - Five mēmrē on Parables of Jesus - of the Ten Virgins, of the Prodigal Son, of the rich man and Lazarus, of the Workers in the Vineyard, and of the Tares

=== German ===
- Allgeier, Arthur (1917). "Der König und die Königin des 44. (45.) Psalmes im Lichte des N. Test. und der altchristlichen Auslegung. Ein Beitrag zur Begriffsgeschichte der Sponsa Christi". Der Katholik. 19 (3): 145–173.
- Allgeier, Arthur (1922). "Ein syrischer Memrâ über die Seele religionsgeschichtlichem Rahmen". Archiv fiir Religionswissenschaft. 21: 360–396.
- Kruger, Paul (1952). "Die älteste syrisch-nestorianische Dokument über die Engel". Ostkirchliche Studien. 1: 283–296.
- Kruger, Paul (1958b). "Ein Missionsdokument aus frühchristlicher Zeit. Deutung und Übersetzung des Sermo de memoria Petri et Pauli des Narsai". Zeitschrift für Missionswissenschaft und Religions wissenschaft. 42: 271–291.

=== Italian ===
- Mingana, Paul T. (2003). E saranno benedetti nel tuo seme tutti i popoli della terra : uno studio di Pshitta Gn 22, 15-18 nell'esegesi di Mar Narsai, tesi di laurea in Teologia Biblica / Paul T. Mingana. Pontificia Universitas Urbaniana.

== See also ==
- Romanos the Melodist
