= Severus Sebokht =

Syriac scholar and bishop (575–667)

Severus Sebokht (Syriac: ܣܐܘܝܪܐ ܣܝܒܘܟܬ), also Seboukt of Nisibis, was a Syriac scholar and bishop who was born in Nisibis, Roman Syria in 575 and died in 667.

Although little is known about his early life, he was one of the leading figures in Syria in the 7th century. He taught at the Theological School of Nisibis. In 612, he left the post because of a doctrinal dispute with the Church of the East. He was a member of the Syriac Orthodox Church. He was a resident of the monastery of Qenneshre, which was situated near the banks of the Euphrates; he was eventually ordained bishop of Qenneshre. His student, Jacob of Edessa (d. 708), was the major representative of "Christian Hellenism".

He was a teacher of the philosophy of Aristotle. In 638, he wrote a major treatise on syllogisms. He translated from Persian into Syriac the commentaries on Aristotle of Paul the Persian.

He participated in debates with the Maronites in Damascus in 659, in the presence of Muawiya.

He was perhaps the first Syrian to mention the Indian number system.

He wrote a major treatise on the astrolabe. His treatise contained 25 chapters and provided detailed explanations of the measurements of the movements of heavenly bodies.

== Translations ==
Severus' Letter on Climates has been partially translated. The first section of the work was translated by Olivier Defaux and the second part by Emilie Villey.

Severus' Letter to Basil of Cyprus has been translated. It was done by Daniel Knister. This is an important document because it is the first place where Hindu numerals are specifically referenced in Europe.

== See also ==
- History of the Hindu–Arabic numeral system
- Astrolabe
- Paul the Persian
