= George of Izla =

East Syriac martyr and theologian (died 615)

George of Izla (Classical Syriac: ܓܝܘܪܓܝܣ ܕܐܝܙܠܐ, Gēwargis d'Izlā, born Mihrām-gušnasp or Mihr-Māh-gošnasp, died 615) was an East Syriac martyr, theologian and interpreter. He was mainly remembered for his role in a royal disputation which eventually led to his execution.

== Early life ==
Mihramgushnasp appears to have been born in the village of Paqōrya d'Benšbail in Mesopotamia in the late 6th century. He was raised Zoroastrian in a noble dehqan family. His father Babai was the ōstāndār (official in charge of crown property) of Nasibin, his grandfather had held the prefecture of Weh Antiok Khosrow near Ctesiphon. His mother was the daughter of a Magian mowbed (high priest).

Mihramgushnasp received his education in Zoroastrian religious rituals and Persian literature, and by the age of seven he learned to recite the Yashts and perform the Barsom. He later married his sister Hazaroe, which was a common practice among aristocratic Magians.

== Conversion ==
The late Sasanian period saw an increase of conversions from Zoroastrianism to Christianity. It seemed that the Church of the East directed their missionary efforts at the Sasanian ruling class in hopes of Christianising the empire, as had been the case with the Roman Empire. Mihramgushnasp and his sister-wife, known later by her Christian name "Maria", were among the aristocratic converts. He apparently left his family to marry a Christian wife, and informed her family of his intentions to be baptised. He succeeded in convincing his sister of converting as well, and together they announced their conversion by desecrating the holy fire, deliberately seeking martyrdom. However they were not executed, and he left for a monastery in Mount Izla, Tur Abdin in 601, where he received his Christian education alongside Babai the Great, one of the most influential theologians of the Church of the East.

== Disputation and death ==
George of Izla participated in several debates with Zoroastrians. His knowledge of the Avesta gave him an edge over his rivals.

The most famous disputation in which he took part was a debate between members of the Church of the East and the Miaphysite Syriac Orthodox Church, convened by the Sasanian king Khosrow II in 612 at the royal court in Ctesiphon. The Church of the East delegation was headed by George of Izla while Gabriel of Sinjar, the Shah's physician, led the Miaphysites. Later sources claim that George won the debate. In retaliation, Gabriel brought up George on charges of apostasy from Zoroastrianism, a crime punishable by death in Sasanian law.

George was judged and convicted of apostasy. He was crucified in the straw market in Veh-Ardashir In 615.
