= School of Antioch =

Early Christian center of biblical study

The Catechetical School of Antioch was one of the two major Christian centers of the study of biblical exegesis and theology during Late Antiquity; the other was the School of Alexandria. This group was known by this name because the advocates of this tradition were based in the city of Antioch in Roman Syria (modern-day Turkey), one of the major cities of the ancient Roman Empire. Although there were early interpreters from Antioch, like Theophilus of Antioch, the proper school of exegesis at Antioch belongs to the period of the 4th and 5th centuries.

While the Christian intellectuals of Alexandria emphasized the allegorical interpretation of Scriptures and tended toward a Christology that emphasized the union of the human and the divine, those in Antioch held to a more literal and occasionally typological exegesis and a Christology that emphasized the distinction between the human and the divine in the person of Jesus Christ. They rejected notions of instantaneous creation held by other figures such as Augustine, and instead literally held to the notion of the progressive creation of the Genesis creation narrative: those things created on the sixth day did not exist in the fifth, that made on the fifth day did not exist in the fourth, and so on. Advocates included Acacius of Caesarea, Severian of Gabala, Theodore of Mopsuestia, Theodoret, and others.

Nestorius, before becoming patriarch of Constantinople, had been a monk at Antioch and had there become imbued with the principles of the Antiochene theological school.

== Periods ==
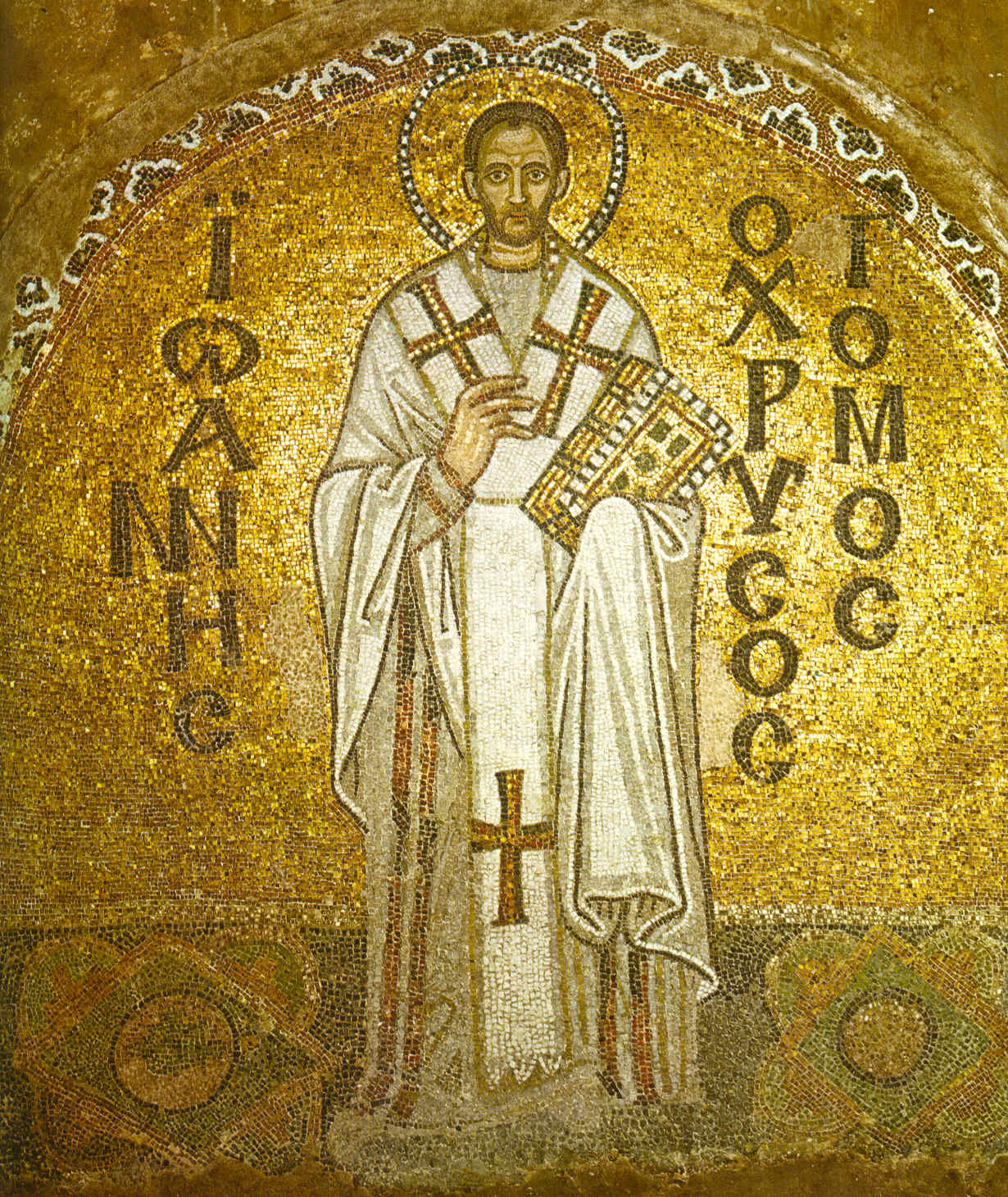
John Chrysostom (347–407)

The school of Antioch is best divided into three periods: the early school from 170 to the early 4th century; the middle school from 350 to 433; and the late school after 433.

The earliest author known is Theophilus of Antioch. Then there is a gap of a century, and in the first half of the 4th century there are three known antiochene authors: the best known is Eusebius of Emesa; other representatives are Acacius of Caesarea and Theodore, bishop of Heraklea.

The middle period includes at least three different generations: Diodorus of Tarsus, who directed an ἀσκητήριον (school) he may have founded. Among his disciples, the best known are John Chrysostom and Theodore of Mopsuestia. The main figure of the third generation was Nestorius.

After the Council of Ephesus in 431, the School of Antioch lost some of its prestige. Later authors include Gennadius of Constantinople.

== See also ==
- School of Edessa
- School of Nisibis
- School of Seleucia-Ctesiphon
- Early Christianity
- Nestorianism
