= School of Edessa =

Syriac christian theological school

The School of Edessa (Syriac: ܐܣܟܘܠܐ ܕܐܘܪܗܝ) was a Christian theological school of great importance to the Syriac-speaking world. It had been founded as long ago as the 2nd century by the kings of the Abgar dynasty. In 363, Nisibis fell to the Persians in a peace treaty, causing Ephrem the Syrian, accompanied by a number of teachers, to leave the School of Nisibis. They went to Edessa, where Ephrem took over the directorship of its school. Then, its importance grew still further. There were innumerable monasteries at Edessa housing many monks. Ephrem occupied a cell there, practicing the ascetic life, interpreting Holy Scripture, composing poetry and hymns and teaching in the school, as well as instructing young girls in church music.

The first recorded director of the School of Edessa was Qiiore, in the early 5th century. He had ascetic and scholarly qualifications and an administrative ability. Occupying the Chair of Exegesis (mepasqana), he replaced the texts of Ephraim with those of Theodore of Mopsuestia. With that seminal decision, Qiiore embarked upon a course of study that was to mix the deductive principles of Aristotle with Theodore's Dyophysite creed.

In 489, after the Nestorian Schism, the Byzantine emperor Zeno, acting on the advice of Bishop Cyrus II of Edessa, ordered the school summarily closed for its teachings of Nestorian doctrine. Its scholars moved back to the School of Nisibis.

== People ==
The following people are associated with the School of Edessa:

- Barhadbshabba Arbaya, historian of the school (c.600)
- Barsauma of Nisibis, student and teacher (fl. 489)
- Elishaʿ bar Quzbaye, student (early 5th century)
- Ephrem the Syrian, teacher (360s)
- Ibas of Edessa, head (early 5th century)
- Jacob of Serugh, student (late 5th century)
- Narsai, student and head (fl. 471)

== Bibliography ==
- Brock, Sebastian P. (2005). "The Theological Schools of Antioch, Edessa and Nisibis". Christianity: A History in the Middle East. Beirut: Middle East Council of Churches. pp. 143–160.
- Drijvers, Hendrik J. W. (1995). "The School of Edessa: Greek Learning and Local Culture". Centres of Learning: Learning and Location in Pre-Modern Europe and the Near East. Leiden: Brill. pp. 49–59.
- Griffith, Sidney H. (2002). "Christianity in Edessa and the Syriac-Speaking World: Mani, Bar Daysan, and Ephraem, the Struggle for Allegiance on the Aramean Frontier". Journal of the Canadian Society for Syriac Studies. 2: 5–20. Archived from the original on 2019-09-10.
- Griffith, Sidney H. (2003). "The Doctrina Addai as a Paradigm of Christian Thought in Edessa in the Fifth Century" (PDF). Hugoye: Journal of Syriac Studies. 6 (2): 269–292.
- Hunter, Erica C. D. (2002). "The Transmission of Greek Philosophy via the School of Edessa". Literacy, Education and Manuscript Transmission in Byzantium and Beyond. Leiden: Brill. pp. 225–239.
- Meyendorff, John (1989). Imperial unity and Christian divisions: The Church 450–680 A.D. Crestwood, NY: St. Vladimir's Seminary Press.
- Reinink, Gerrit J. (1995). "Edessa Grew Dim and Nisibis Shone Forth: The School of Nisibis at the Transition of the Sixth-Seventh Century". Centres of Learning: Learning and Location in Pre-modern Europe and the Near East. Leiden: Brill. pp. 77–89.
- Seleznyov, Nikolai N. (2010). "Nestorius of Constantinople: Condemnation, Suppression, Veneration: With special reference to the role of his name in East-Syriac Christianity". Journal of Eastern Christian Studies. 62 (3–4): 165–190.
