= Gabriel of Sinjar =

Gabriel of Sinjar (Classical Syriac: ܓܒܪܐܝܠ ܕܫܝܓܪ, Gaḅriyel d'Šiggar) was a court physician (drustbed) of the Sasanian shah Khosrow II (r. 590–628). He played a major role in inter-Christian rivalries in the Sasanian empire.

== Biography ==
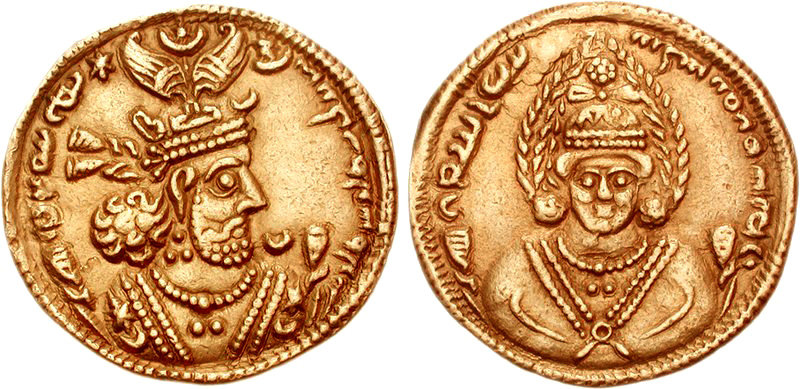
Coin of Khosrow II (r. 590–628)

Gabriel was born in Sinjar to a Syrian Miaphysite family. According to one account he became a court physician (drustbed) after curing the sterility of the shah's favourite wife, Shirin, who eventually gave birth to a son named Mardanshah. Shirin later converted to the Syriac Orthodox Church under Gabriel's influence. Shirin also influenced by Gabriel, tried to replace Dyophysitism (Church of the East) with Miaphysitism as the official form of Christianity in the Iranian empire.

Gabriel convinced the shah to prohibit the Church of the East from appointing a new leader after the death of its Catholicos, Gregory. He also tried to exploit the fragmentation of the Church of the East in order to weaken it: he convinced Khosrow II to convene a disputation at his court between Miaphysites and Dyophysites, knowing that the Church of the East would have to produce a formula of faith that would not be universally accepted by all its bishops.

In the 612 disputation, Babai the Great presented the Sasanians' first clear and "official" Miaphysite christology which did as expected cause schisms amongst members of his church. During the disputation George of Izla, a Zoroastrian convert to the Church of the East, objected to Gabriel's expulsion of Dyophysite monks from their monasteries. Gabriel retaliated by accusing George of apostasy from the state religion, which caused the latter's execution by the Sasanian authorities in 615. The news of this event circulated widely across the elites of Ctesiphon, and demonstrated that the court was willing to exert violence in order to preserve the Zoroastrian religion.

Gabriel of Sinjar died not long after. Eventually, as the Sasanians suffered defeat at the hands of the Byzantines, the Miaphysites too fell out of favour and Christians of all sects were persecuted.

== Sources ==
- Baum, Wilhelm (2004). Shirin: Christian Queen Myth of Love: A Woman Of Late Antiquity: Historical Reality And Literary Effect. Gorgias Press LLC. ISBN 978-1-59333-282-2.
- Casiday, Augustine (2012). The Orthodox Christian World. Routledge. ISBN 978-1-136-31484-1.
- Haar Romeny, R. B. ter (2010). Religious Origins of Nations?: The Christian Communities of the Middle East. BRILL. ISBN 978-90-04-17375-0.
- Morony, Michael G. (2005) [1984]. Iraq After The Muslim Conquest. Gorgias Press LLC. ISBN 978-1-59333-315-7.
- Payne, Richard E. (2015). A State of Mixture: Christians, Zoroastrians, and Iranian Political Culture in Late Antiquity. Univ of California Press. pp. 1–320. ISBN 9780520961531.
