= Paul the Persian =

Iranian philosopher of the 6th century CE

Paul the Persian or Paulus Persa was a 6th-century East Syriac theologian and philosopher in the court of the Sassanid king Khosrow I (r. 531–579). Paul's treatises on Aristotle would influence medieval Islamic philosophy. Notable works include his commentary in Syriac on Aristotle's Logic, in which Paul declares the superiority of science over faith.

Paul may have studied Greek philosophy at the School of Nisibis in modern Turkey and at the Academy of Gondishapur in Iran. Scholars have variously identified him with Paul of Nisibis or Paul of Basra. The administrative capital of the Sasanid Empire was Ctesiphon in modern Iraq.

== Life and known works ==
Paul the Persian is mentioned in the 9th-century The Chronicle of Seert and from the Chronicon Ecclesiasticum of the 13th-century Syriac Orthodox Church historian Bar-Hebraeus. These sources indicate that he was born in Dershahr in Persia. Bar-Hebraeus mentions that he lived during the time of the Nestorian patriarch Ezekiel (567-580). According to Bar-Hebraeus, Paul was a cleric in the Church of the East and well versed in theological and philosophical subjects.

Paul wrote two known works. One was an introduction to the philosophy of Aristotle which he delivered before Khosrow I and was later translated into Syriac by Severus Sebokht. This work was also translated into Arabic at a later date. The other work is On Interpretation, which has never been published.

Both the Chronicle of Seert and Bar-Hebraeus record that Paul aspired to the office of metropolitan of Fars and, failing to be elected, converted to Zoroastrianism. However, their claim is not otherwise documented and may be the product of the rivalry between the "Jacobite" Syriac Orthodox Church and the "Nestorian" Church of the East. The entry in the Chronicle of Seert reads:

[Khosrow] was very learned in philosophy, which he had studied, it is said, under Mar Bar Samma, bishop of Qardu, and under Paul the Persian Philosopher, who, being unable to obtain the metropolitan see of Persia, renounced the Christian religion.

== Works ==
- Prolegomena to Philosophy and Logic
- Treatise on the Logic of Aristotle the Philosopher addressed to King Khhuosrowousrowau (in Syriac; British Museum ms. 988 [Add. 144660], ff. 55v-67rv; Wright 1872, 1872, p. 1161); translated into Latin by J. P. N. Land

== See also ==
- List of pre-modern Iranian scientists and scholars
