= Babai the Great =

Church father of the Church of the East (c. 551–628)

Mar Babai the Great

Abbot of Abraham's Monastery
- Born: c. 551; Beth Ainata in Beth Zabdai
- Died: c. 628; Abraham's Monastery on Mt. Izla, Nisibis
- Venerated in: Church of the East
- Controversy: Christology

Babai the Great (ܒܵܒܲܝ ܪܲܒܵܐ bābay rabbā, c. 551 – 628) was an early church father of the Church of the East. He set several of the foundational pillars of the Church, revived the monastic movement, and formulated its Christology in a systematic way. He served as a monastic visitor and coadjutor with Mar Aba as unofficial heads of the Church of the East (formerly referred to as the "Nestorian Church") after Catholicos Gregory until 628 AD, leaving a legacy of strong discipline and deep religious Orthodoxy. He is revered in the modern Assyrian Church of the East and Ancient Church of the East.

== Biography ==
Babai the Great (not to be confused with Mar Babai I, the first autonomous leader of the Church of the East) was born in the town of Beth Ainata in Beth Zabdai, on the west bank of the Tigris, near Nisibis. He was born to a family of humble means, and studied at the Christian School of Nisibis under the directorship of Abraham of Beth Rabban. Sometime around 571 A.D., when the Origenist Henana of Adiabene became the new headmaster, Babai's teacher, Abraham the Great of Kashkar, founded a new monastery on Mt. Izla above Nisibis. Babai taught for a while at the Xenodocheio of Nisibis. After that he joined the newly founded monastery of Abraham on Mt. Izla. When Abraham died in 588, Babai left and founded a new monastery and school in his home country Beth Zabdai. In 604 Babai became the third abbot of Abraham's monastery on Mt. Izla.

Abraham the Great had started a monastic reform movement which Babai and other disciples carried through. Since Bar Sauma and the Synod of Beth Lapat, monks and nuns had been encouraged to marry. When Babai returned to Mt. Izla in 604, he expelled monks that lived with women on the fringes of the monastery, and enforced strict discipline, emphasizing a deep life of prayer and solitude. The result was a mass exodus, not only of the married monks.

But the Church of the East was with Babai. In 604, the Catholicos Mar Sabrisho I died and a new Catholicos had to be elected. The choice fell between two men named Gregory: Bishop Gregory of Nisibis and Professor Gregory of Seleucia. King Khosrau II, ruler of the Sassanid Empire, stated only that his preferred candidate was Gregory, possibly meaning the bishop. The king's influential wife Shirin, however, disliked Gregory of Nisibis and preferred Gregory of Seleucia, who had once been her steward. The Synod (council) rejected the king's initial candidate, taking advantage of the ambiguity of name, and chose Gregory of Seleucia. The king was accordingly displeased, and reluctantly supported the elected candidate (after applying a hefty fine to him), and said, "Patriarch he is and patriarch he shall be – but never again do I allow another election."

When the Catholicos Gregorius died a few years later in 608, the bishops made the usual request to the king to allow them to elect a new Catholicos, but Khosrau had not forgotten the events of the previous election and refused them permission to do so. The royal physician Gabriel of Shiggar, a staunch Miaphysite, suggested to make Henana of Adiabene or one of his students Catholicos, and also used his influence with the king to prevent an election.

From 610 to 628 the last and most devastating wars between Byzantium and Persia took place. First Persia conquered parts of Byzantium, which were populated mostly by Miaphysite and Chalcedonian Christians. To be popular in the newly gained provinces, King Khosrau II did not want to favor the Church of the East anymore. During the successful Byzantine counterattack 622–628, Chalcedonians and especially Miaphysites were on the advance in Persia, and several sees and villages were lost by the Church of the East. The king successfully blocked an election in the church, preventing the church from having any figure who could allow new bishops and metropolitans to be consecrated.

During the decades of this vacancy, the Church of the East required a sort of authority. Because the king remained staunch in his policy, the church chose to separate itself from the king's royal proscription. Two vekils (regents) were selected as a stop-gap measure: Archdeacon Mar Aba, who handled matters in the South. In the North, Babai the Great was chosen to lead, who at the time was abbot of a monastery on Mt. Izla. He was nominated inspector-general or visitor of the monasteries of the three northern provinces by the Metropolitans of Nisibis, B. Garmai, and Adiabene. Therefore, Babai, even though not yet a bishop, acted as patriarch in all ecclesiastical matters, though he could not ordain or consecrate. He was appointed 'visitor of the monasteries' of the North and administered the church in collaboration with Archdeacon Mar Aba. In particular, this new position allowed Babai to investigate the orthodoxy of the monasteries and monks of northern Mesopotamia, and to enforce discipline throughout the monasteries of northern Mesopotamia, even against occasional resistance.

Babai the Great and Mar Aba administered the Church of the East for 17 years. Attempts were made during that time to ask the king to change his mind and allow an election, but influences in the court, such as Gabriel of Shiggar, and the king's wife Shirin, both miaphysite, blocked the requests. Gabriel was seeking to maneuver things such that the decision of Catholicos would have been in his own hands, an option completely unacceptable to the bishops.

The king defended this policy until his death in 628. The situation, and vacancy, endured until Khosrau II was murdered in 628. After this, Babai was promptly, and unanimously, elected Catholicos, but he declined. Soon afterward, he died in the cell of his monastery on Mt. Izla, being 75 or 77 years old.

== Babai's teaching ==
Besides bringing discipline to the monasteries and administering the church, Babai is mainly known for his orthodox teaching.

=== Babai's writing ===
To defend and clarify the East Syriac tradition and theology against Henana's Origenism and the advancing Monophysites, Babai the Great produced some 83 or 84 volumes of writing. He developed a systematic Christology, which is vital in the Assyrian Church of the East until today. Of his extensive exegetical works on all of Scripture nothing survived. What remains are two hagiographies (of Christina and George of Izla), his principal work on the foundations of ascetic life 'On the Life of Excellency', and commentaries on mystical themes.

From what has been preserved it appears that his main authority was Theodore of Mopsuestia, though in general he used few citations from the Fathers. There is no evidence that he could read Greek, and Babai must have relied on translations.

He mainly fought against the ideas of the Monophysites and of the Origenist Henana. They were the inner enemies. He also wrote against the doctrines of Mani, Gnostic doctrines of Marcion, of Bar Daisan, of the Messalians and the general loss of discipline in monasteries in Beth Lapat.

The Book of Union is Babai's most systematic surviving Christological treatise, divided into seven memre that cover more than 200 folios. The 'Tractatus Vaticanus' is another manuscript that deals with the, "impossibility of the hypostatic union and natural union, the possibility of the parsopic union, and the significance of the expression hypostatic union among the fathers of the antiquity".

An important source on the position of Babai the Great against Origen and his follower Henana of Adiabene is his commentary on Evagrius Ponticus. It also shows his opposition to Messalianism. An 8th-century manuscript has been preserved that contains Evagrius' text together with Babai's commentary on it. This commentary is an abridged version of a larger one which Babai had written earlier and which is lost.

The writings of Evagrius were important to the current mystical revival among Greek and Syrian monks. For the monks of Mt. Izla, Evagrius was the pillar of mystical theology. The Greek text was condemned already in 553 for its Origenist heresies.

But unlike the Greek, the 'Common Syriac Version', a translation of the Gnostic chapters of Evagrius by the Miaphysite Philoxenus, was void of the specific Origenist-Evagrian Christology. For example, it omits the 'nous-Christos' Christology where the God-logos and the flesh are united in the nous, Jesus Christ, the subject of incarnation. Babai tried to eliminate the Origenist ideas even further and presented Evagrius as opposed to Origen and his follower Henana by pointing out apparent contradictions between them.

"The Devil is telling the people that some of Evagrius' statements are similar to heresies. Some even tried to translate directly from the Greek to show the heresy of Evagrius. They translated according to their foolishness, but can be refuted by other writings of Evagrius. The cursed Origen and his disciple, the fool Apollinaris, they teach completely different from Evagrius on the renewal of the soul after death".

To show this further, Babai tells the vita of Evagrius and enumerates his sources: Basilius, Gregorius, and Nectarius.

=== Babai's Christology ===
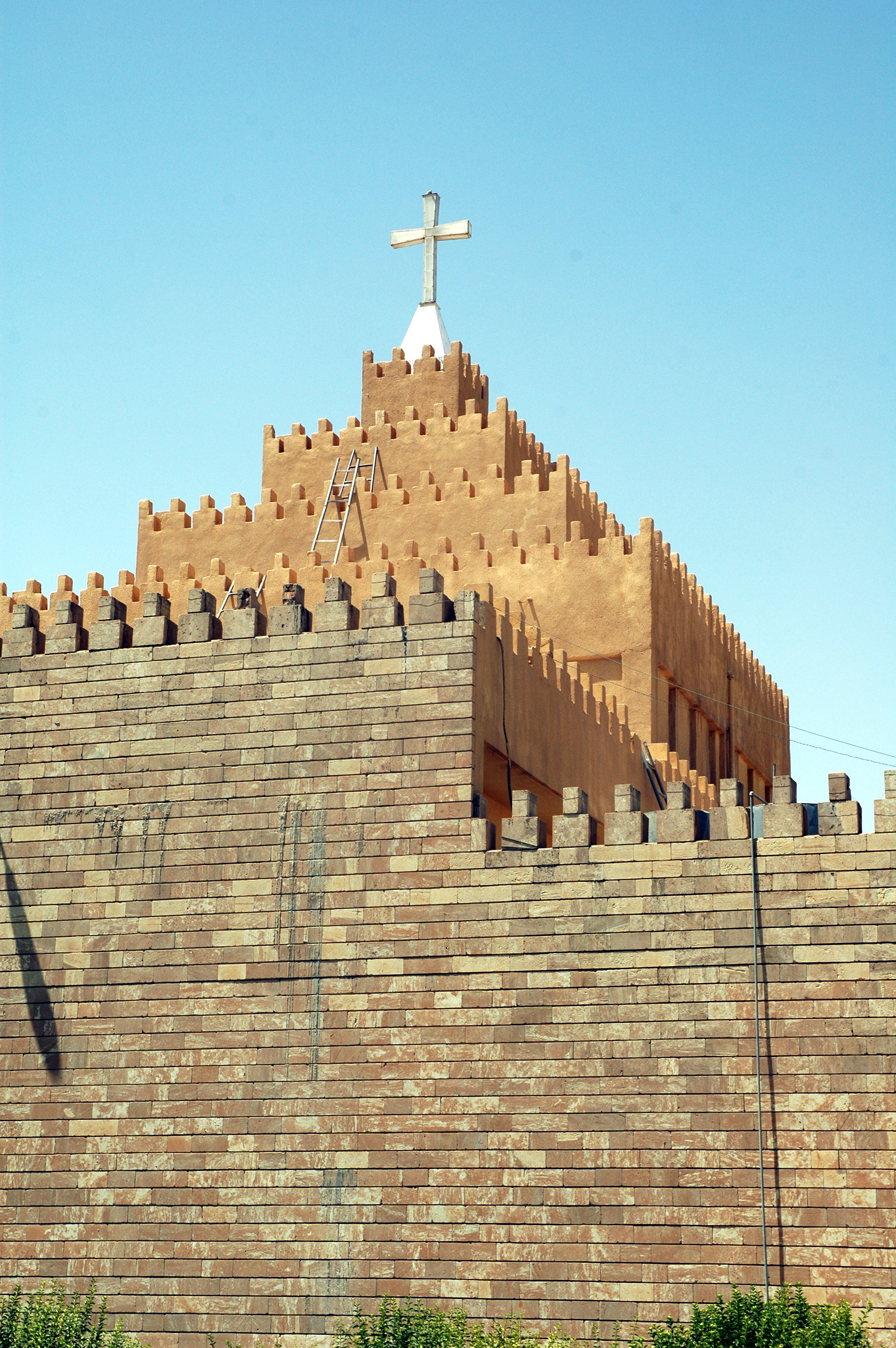
The Holy Apostolic Catholic Assyrian Church of the East. The normative Christology of the Assyrian church was written by Babai the Great (551–628) and is clearly distinct from the accusations directed toward Nestorius.

The main theological authorities of Babai were Theodore of Mopsuestia and Diodorus of Tarsus. He also relied on John Chrysostomos, the Cappadocian fathers and on Ephrem the Syrian, which were also accepted in the West. In his exegetical methods he synthesized between the rational Theodore and mystical writers like Evagrius.

And most important, instead of breaking with Theodore because of some extreme interpretations of his teachings, like others did, Babai clarified his position to the point that differences with western Christology became superficial and mostly an issue of terminology. His Christology is far less dualistic than the one Nestorius seems to have presented.

Babai in the 'Book of Union' teaches two qnome ('nature, essence', the miaphysite West Syriac Church uses the word to mean 'hypostasis'), which are unmingled but everlastingly united in one parsopa (from Greek prosopon, 'person, character, identity'). It is essential to use the Syrian terms here and not any translations, because the same words mean different things to different people, and the words must be accepted in the particular sense of each. In Greek Christology, hypostasis is used specifically to refer to what would correspond to Babai's parsopa, and ousion would correspond to qnome. In the period in which Babai and others formulated their respective Christological models, words such as hypostasis and ousion had less specifically fixed definitions. Thus, it was possible for two individuals to honestly use a single term to mean two distinctly different things. According to Jaroslav Pelikan, "Syriac was a richer and more complex language than either Greek or Arabic, and it allowed for more precise distinction".

To Babai, Christ is both God and man. But he could not tolerate any form of Theopaschism (the belief that God suffered), be it the divinity itself, the Trinity, or one of the hypostases of the Trinity. According to Babai, Cyril of Alexandria stood at the root of simple Theopaschism as professed by the Miaphysites, and the Emperor Justinian I at the root of composite Theopaschism. The Church of the East could accept expressions like 'Christ died', 'the Son died', but not 'the Word died', even not 'the Word died in the flesh'.

In the sixth century AD, Mar Babai wrote the Teshbokhta or (Hymn of Praise) explaining the theology of the Church of the East He writes:

One is Christ the Son of God,
Worshiped by all in two natures;
In His Godhead begotten of the Father,
Without beginning before all time;
In His humanity born of Mary,
In the fullness of time, in a body united;
Neither His Godhead is of the nature of the mother,
Nor His humanity of the nature of the Father;
The natures are preserved in their Qnumas (substance),
In one person of one Sonship.
And as the Godhead is three substances in one nature,
Likewise the Sonship of the Son is in two natures, one person.
So the Holy Church has taught.

== List of works, including critical editions and translations ==
The writings of Babai the Great have only partially been published in critical editions and modern translations. Sebastian Brock has written a complete catalogue of his surviving and lost works.

The principal work of Babi, the Book of Union, was published in a complete English translation alongside a critical Syriac text for the first time in 2024.

The complete inventory of the works of Babai the Great and, where they exist, critical editions and modern translations, is:

- Book of Union (full title: On the Divinity and Humanity [of Christ] and on the Prosopon of the Union)
  - Full English translation and Syriac edition: Royel, Mar Awa III, ed. (2024). The Book of Union of Babai the Great: English Translation with Edited Syriac Text. Texts and Studies in Eastern Christianity. Vol. 32. Translated by Birnie, Michael J. Leiden and Boston: Brill. doi:10.1163/9789004680081. ISBN 978-90-04-26613-1.
  - Critical edition and Latin translation: Vaschalde, Arthur Adolphe, ed. (1915). Babai Magni Liber de Unione. Corpus Scriptorum Christianorum Orientalium. Vol. 79–80 (Scriptores Syri 34–35). Paris and Louvain.
  - Partial English translation (chapters 9 and 17): DelCogliano, Mark, ed. (2022). "Babai the Great, On the Union 9 and 17". The Cambridge Edition of Early Christian Writings, Volume 4: Christ: Chalcedon and Beyond. Translated by Zaleski, John. Cambridge: Cambridge University Press. pp. 427–446. ISBN 978-1-316-51114-5.
- Christological Excerpt ("Two Natures Imply Two Qnome")
  - Syriac edition and full English translation: Abramowski, Luise; Goodman, Alan E., eds. (1972). A Nestorian Collection of Christological Texts: Cambridge University Library MS. Oriental 1319. University of Cambridge Oriental Publications. Vol. 18–19. Cambridge: Cambridge University Press. pp. vol. 1, pp. 207–209 (Syriac), vol. 2, pp. 123–125 (English). ISBN 978-0-521-08126-9.
- Commentary on Evagrius of Pontus's Kephalaia Gnostika
  - Syriac edition, Greek retroversion, and German commentary: Frankenberg, Wilhelm, ed. (1912). Evagrius Ponticus. Abhandlungen der Königlichen Gesellschaft der Wissenschaften zu Göttingen, Philologisch-Historische Klasse, Neue Folge. Vol. 13.2. Berlin: Weidmann. pp. 8–471.
- Useful Counsels on the Ascetic Life
  - Full English translation: Mar Babai the Great: Some Useful Counsels on the Ascetical Life. Moran Etho. Vol. 15. Translated by Chediath, Geevarghese. Kottayam: St. Ephrem Ecumenical Research Institute (SEERI). 2001.
- Monastic Rules (preserved only in Arabic translation)
  - Arabic edition and full English translation: Vööbus, Arthur, ed. (1960). Syriac and Arabic Documents Regarding Legislation Relative to Syrian Asceticism. Papers of the Estonian Theological Society in Exile. Vol. 11. Stockholm: Estonian Theological Society in Exile. pp. 176–184.
- Commentary on Mark the Monk's Spiritual Law
  - Critical edition and translation: Unpublished. Studied in Krüger, Paul (1960). "Zum theologischen Menschenbild Babais des Grossen nach seinem noch unveröffentlichten Kommentar zu den beiden Sermones des Mönches Markus über "Das geistige Gesetz"". Oriens Christianus. 44: 46–74.
- Life of George of Izla (Mihramgushnasp) (embeds a catalogue of Babai's lost hagiographical works at pp. 424–428)
  - Syriac edition: Bedjan, Paul, ed. (1895). Histoire de Mar-Jabalaha, de trois autres patriarches, d'un prêtre et deux laïques, nestoriens. Paris and Leipzig: Otto Harrassowitz. pp. 416–571.
  - Partial German translation: Auszüge aus syrischen Akten persischer Märtyrer. Abhandlungen für die Kunde des Morgenlandes. Vol. 7.3. Translated by Hoffmann, Georg. Leipzig: F. A. Brockhaus. 1880. pp. 91–115.
- Martyrdom of Christina (Yazdoy) (fragmentary)
  - Syriac edition: Bedjan, Paul, ed. (1894). Acta Martyrum et Sanctorum. Vol. 4. Paris and Leipzig: Otto Harrassowitz. pp. 201–207.
- Liturgical hymns (tešbḥātā) and Sinai monastic fragments
  - Two tešbḥātā ("Our Father who is in heaven, holy is his nature..." and "Blessed is the Compassionate One...") are attributed to Babai in East Syriac liturgical manuscripts, alongside a Hymn for the Commemoration of the Greek Doctors and unedited fragments of a monastic work.
