= Theodore of Mopsuestia =

4/5th-century Eastern Christian theologian; Archbishop of Mopsuestia

Mar Theodore of Mopsuestia

Archbishop of Mopsuestia
- Born: c. 350; Antioch, Coele Syria, Roman Empire
- Died: c. 428
- Venerated in: Assyrian Church of the East; Ancient Church of the East
- Controversy: Arianism, Original Sin, Christology, Theotokos

Theodore of Mopsuestia (Greek: Θεοδώρος, c. 350 – 428) was a Christian theologian, and Bishop of Mopsuestia (as Theodore II) from 392 to 428 AD. He is also known as Theodore of Antioch, from the place of his birth and presbyterate. He is the best known representative of the middle Antioch School of hermeneutics.

== Life ==
Theodore was born at Antioch, where his father held an official position and the family was wealthy (Chrysostom, ad Th. Laps. ii). Theodore's cousin, Paeanius, to whom several of John Chrysostom's letters are addressed, held an important post of civil government. Theordore's brother Polychronius became bishop of the metropolitan see of Apamea. Theodore was born in Antioch about 350. He planned to have a career in law and studied philosophy and rhetoric under Libanius; however, after meeting Chrysostom, he decided to change his career. He was ordained a presbyter in the Church of Antioch in 383.

He taught for a time and was elected bishop of Mopsuestia in 392. For most of his career, the church held him in high regard; however, this began to change during the Nestorian controversy. When he died, he still held a solid reputation in the church. He was a prolific writer and he wrote commentaries on Genesis, the Psalms, the Prophets, Job, the four Gospels and Acts, as well as his work entitled, Against those who say that man falls by nature, and not by sentence.

== Career ==
Theodore first appears as the early companion and friend of Chrysostom, his fellow-townsman, his equal in rank, and but two or three years his senior in age. Together with their common friend Maximus, who was later bishop of Isaurian Seleucia, Chrysostom and Theodore attended the lectures of the Greek-speaking teacher of rhetoric Libanius (Socr. vi.3; Soz. viii.1), then at Antioch in the zenith of his fame. We have the assurance of Sozomen that he enjoyed a philosophical education. Chrysostom credits his friend with diligent study, but the luxurious life of polite Antioch seems to have received an equal share of his thoughts. When Chrysostom himself had been converted to the monastic life of Basil of Caesarea, he likewise converted Maximus and Theodore. The three friends left Libanius and sought a retreat in the monastic school of Carterius and Diodorus, to which Basil was already attached. It is unclear whether Theodore had been previously baptized before taking up monastic vows. Yet from the writings of Chrysostom it is clear he found joy in ascetic self-discipline, and he had just assumed a celibate life when he was fascinated by a girl named Hermione (Chrysostom ibid. i.), and contemplated marriage, at the same time returning to his former manner of life (Soz. viii.2). His "fall" spread consternation through the little society, and the anxiety drew forth from Chrysostom the earliest of his literary compositions - two letters "to Theodore upon his fall." These compositions kept Theodore fast to his vows, although the disappointment left traces in his later life.

Chrysostom's connection with Diodore was probably broken off in 374, when he plunged into a more complete monastic seclusion; Theodore's seems to have continued until the elevation of Diodore to the see of Tarsus in 378. During this period doubtless the foundations were laid of Theodore's understanding of the Bible and ecclesiastical doctrine, and he was imbued for life with the principles of scriptural interpretation which Diodore had inherited from an earlier generation of Antiochenes, and with the peculiar views of the Person of Christ into which the master had been led by his antagonism to Apollinaris of Laodicea. The latter years of this decade witnessed Theodore's first appearance as a writer. He began with a commentary on the Psalms, in which the method of Diodore was exaggerated, and which he lived to repent of (Facund. iii.6, x.1; v. infra, §III). The orthodox at Antioch, it seems, resented the loss of the traditional Messianic interpretation, and, according to Hesychius of Jerusalem, Theodore was compelled to promise that he would commit his maiden work to the flames - a promise he contrived to evade (Mansi, ix.284).

Gennadius of Marseilles (de Vir. Ill. 12) represents Theodore as a presbyter of the church of Antioch; and from a letter of John of Antioch (Facund. ii.2) we gather that forty-five years elapsed between his ordination and his death. That would mean he was ordained priest at Antioch in 383, in his thirty-third year, the ordaining bishop being doubtless Flavian, Diodore's old friend and fellow-laborer, whose "loving disciple" Theodore now became (John of Antioch, ap. Facund. l.c.). The epithet seems to imply that Theodore was an adherent of the Meletian party, but there is no evidence that he was involved in the feuds which preoccupied the Antiochian church during Flavian's office. Theodore's great treatise on the Incarnation belongs to this period according to Gennadius, and possibly also more than one of his commentaries on the Old Testament. As a preacher he seems to have now attained some eminence in the field of polemics (Facund. viii.4). Theodore is said by Hesychius to have left Antioch while yet a priest and remained in Tarsus until 392, when he was consecrated to the see of Mopsuestia on the death of Olympius, probably through the influence of Diodore. Theodoret states he spent his remaining thirty-six years of life in this town.

Mopsuestia was a free town (Pliny) upon the Pyramus (Ceyhan) river, between Tarsus and Issus, some forty miles from either, and twelve from the sea. It belonged to Cilicia Secunda, of which the metropolitan see was Anazarbus. In the 4th century it was of some importance, famous for its bridge, thrown over the Pyramus by Constantine I.

Theodore's long episcopate was marked by no striking incidents. His letters, long known to the Assyrians as the Book of Pearls, are lost; his followers have left us few personal recollections. In 394 he attended a synod at Constantinople on a question which concerned the see of Bostra in the patriarchate of Antioch. While there, Theodore had the opportunity to preach before the emperor Theodosius I, who was then starting for his last journey to the West. The sermon made a deep impression, and Theodosius, who had sat at the feet of Ambrose and Gregory Nazianzus, declared that he had never met with such a teacher (John of Antioch, ap. Facund. ii.2). Theodosius II inherited his grandfather's respect for Theodore, and often wrote to him. Another glimpse of Theodore's episcopal life is supplied by a letter of Chrysostom to him from Cucusus (AD 404–407) (Chrys. Ep. 212). The exiled patriarch "can never forget the love of Theodore, so genuine and warm, so sincere and guileless, a love maintained from early years, and manifested but now." Chrysostom (Ep. 204) thanks him profoundly for frequent though ineffectual efforts to obtain his release, and praises their friendship in such glowing terms that Theodore's enemies at the fifth Ecumenical Council made unsuccessful efforts to deny the identity of Chrysostom's correspondent with the bishop of Mopsuestia.

Notwithstanding his literary activity, Theodore worked zealously for the good of his diocese. The famous letter of Ibas to Maris testifies that he struggled against extinguished Arianism and other heresies in Mopsuestia. Several of his works are doubtless monuments of these pastoral labors, e.g. the catechetical lectures, the ecthesis, and possibly the treatise on "Persian Magic." Yet his episcopal work was by no means simply that of a diocesan bishop. Everywhere he was regarded as "the herald of the truth and the doctor of the church"; "even distant churches received instruction from him." So Ibas explained to Maris, and his letter was read without a dissentient voice at the Council of Chalcedon (Facund. ii.i seq.). Theodore "expounded Scripture in all the churches of the East," says John of Antioch (ibid. ii.2), with some literary license, and adds that in his lifetime Theodore was never arraigned by any of the orthodox. But in a letter to Nestorius (ibid. x.2) John begs him to retract, urging the example of Theodore, who, when in a sermon at Antioch he had said something which gave great and manifest offence, for the sake of peace and to avoid scandal, after a few days publicly corrected himself. Leontius tells us that the cause of offence was a denial to the Virgin Mary of the title Theotokos. So great was the storm that the people threatened to stone the preacher (Cyril of Alexandria Ep. 69). The heretical sects attacked by Theodore showed their resentment in a way less overt, but perhaps more formidable. They tampered with his writings, hoping thus to involve him in heterodox statements (Facund. x.1).

Theodore's last years were complicated by two controversies. When in 418 the Pelagian leaders were deposed and exiled from the West, they sought in the East the sympathy of the chief living representative of the school of Antioch. This fact is recorded by Marius Mercator, who makes the most of it (Praef. ad Symb. Theod. Mop. 72). They probably resided with Theodore till 422, when Julian of Eclanum returned to Italy. Julian's visit was doubtless the occasion upon which Theodore wrote his book Against the Defenders of Original Sin. Mercator charges Theodore with having turned against Julian as soon as the latter had left Mopsuestia, and anathematized him in a provincial synod. The synod can hardly be a fabrication, since Mercator was a contemporary writer; but it was very possibly convened, as Fritzsche suggests, without any special reference to the Pelagian question. If Theodore then read his ecthesis, the anathema with which that ends might have been represented outside the council as a synodical condemnation of the Pelagian chiefs. Mercator's words, in fact, point to this explanation.

A heresiarch greater than Julian visited Mopsuestia in the last year of his life. It is stated by Evagrius Scholasticus (H.E. i.2) that Nestorius, on his way from Antioch to Constantinople (AD 428), took counsel with Theodore and received from him the seeds of heresy which he shortly afterwards scattered with such disastrous results. Evagrius makes this statement on the authority of one Theodulus, a person otherwise unknown. We may safely reject it, so far as it derives the Christology of Nestorius from this single interview. Towards the close of 428 (Theodoret, H.E. v.39) Theodore died at the age of seventy-eight, having been all his life engaged in controversy, and more than once in conflict with the popular notions of orthodoxy; yet he departed, as Facundus (ii.1) triumphantly points out, in the peace of the church and at the height of a great reputation. The storm was gathering, but did not break until after his death. As the Catholic Encyclopedia points out, during his lifetime, Theodore was considered an orthodox Christian thinker.

== Posthumous legacy ==
The popularity of Theodore increased following his death. Meletius, his successor at Mopsuestia, protested that his life would have been in danger if he had uttered a word against his predecessor (Tillemont, Mém. xii. p. 442). "We believe as Theodore believed; long live the faith of Theodore!" was a cry often heard in the churches of the East (Cyril of Alexandria, Ep. 69). "We had rather be burnt than condemn Theodore," was the reply of the bishops of Syria to the party eager for his condemnation (Ep. 72). The flame was fed by leading men who had been disciples of the Interpreter: by Theodoret, who regarded him as a "doctor of the universal church" (H. E. v. 39); by Ibas of Edessa, who in 433 wrote his famous letter to Maris in praise of Theodore; by John I of Antioch, who in 428 succeeded to the see of Antioch.

Shortly after Theodore's death men in other quarters began to hold him up to obloquy. As early perhaps as 431 Marius Mercator denounced him as the real author of the Pelagian heresy (Lib. subnot. in verba Juliani, praef); and not long afterwards prefaced his translation of Theodore's ecthesis with a still more violent attack on him as the precursor of Nestorianism. The council of Ephesus, however, while it condemned Nestorius by name, did not mention Theodore. The Nestorian party consequently fell back upon the words of Theodore, and began to circulate them in several languages as affording the best available exposition of their views (Liberat. Brev. 10). This circumstance deepened the mistrust of the orthodox, and even in the East there were some who proceeded to condemn the teaching of Theodore. Hesychius of Jerusalem attacked him around 435 in his Ecclesiastical History; Rabbula, bishop of Edessa, who at Ephesus had sided with John of Antioch, now publicly anathematized Theodore (Ibas, Ep. ad Marin.). Patriarch Proclus of Constantinople demanded from the bishops of Syria a condemnation of certain propositions supposed to have been drawn from the writings of Theodore. Cyril, who had once spoken favourably of some of Theodore's works (Facund. viii.6), now under the influence of Rabbula took a decided attitude of opposition; he wrote to the synod of Antioch (Ep. 67) that the opinions of Diodore, Theodore, and others of the same schools had "borne down with full sail upon the glory of Christ"; to the emperor (Ep. 71), that Diodore and Theodore were the parents of the blasphemy of Nestorius; to Proclus (Ep. 72), that had Theodore been still alive and openly approved of the teaching of Nestorius, he ought undoubtedly to have been anathematized; but as he was dead, it was enough to condemn the errors of his books, having regard to the terrible disturbances more extreme measures would excite in the East. He collected and answered a series of propositions gathered from the writings of Diodore and Theodore, a work to which Theodoret replied shortly afterwards.

The ferment then subsided for a time, but the disciples of Theodore, repulsed in the West, pushed their way from Eastern Syria to Persia. Ibas, who succeeded Rabbula in 435, restored the School of Edessa, and it continued to be a nursery of Theodore's theology till suppressed by Emperor Zeno in 489 and found refuge at Nisibis. Among the Nestorians of Persia the writings of Theodore were regarded as the standard both of doctrine and of interpretation, and the Persian church returned the censures of the Roman church by pronouncing an anathema on all who opposed or rejected them (cf. Assem. iii.i.84; and for a full account of the spread of Theodore's opinions at Edessa and Nisibis see Kihn, Theodor und Junilius, pp. 198–209, 333–336).

The 6th century witnessed another and final outbreak of hatred against Theodore. The fifth general council (553), under the influence of the emperor Justinian I, pronounced the anathema which neither Theodosius II nor Cyril thought to issue. This condemnation of Theodore and his two supporters led to the Controversy of the Three Chapters but we may point out one result of Justinian's policy. The African delegation objected not only to a decree which seemed to negate the authority of the councils of Ephesus and Chalcedon, but also violated the sanctity of the dead; they had no particular interest in Theodore's doctrine or method of interpretation. Bishop Pontian plainly told the emperor that he had asked them to condemn men of whose writings they knew nothing. But the stir about Theodore led to inquiry; his works, or portions of them, were translated and circulated in the West. It is almost certainly to this cause that we owe the preservation in a Latin dress of at least one-half of Theodore's commentaries on Paul. Published under the name of Ambrose of Milan, the work of Theodore passed from Africa into the monastic libraries of the West, was copied into the compilations of Rabanus Maurus and others, and in its fuller and its abridged form supplied the Middle Ages with an accepted interpretation of an important part of the Bible. The name of Theodore, however, disappears almost entirely from Western church literature after the 6th century. It was scarcely before the 19th century that justice was done by Western writers to the importance of the great Antiochene as a theologian, an expositor and a precursor of later thought.

Theodore believed that the torment of hell will be finite and will serve to reform sinners (a form of Christian universalism) and he was quoted as an authority on this issue by later bishops of the Church of the East: St. Isaac of Nineveh (7th cent.) and Solomon of Basra (13th cent.), the author of the Book of the Bee. In the 19th century, Edward Beecher discussed Theodore's belief in the finiteness of hell and stressed that it was neither based on the allegorical interpretation of the Bible nor derived from Origen.

== Literary remains ==
Facundus (x.4) speaks of Theodore's "innumerable books"; John of Antioch, in a letter quoted by Facundus (ii.2), describes his polemical works as alone numbering "decem millia" (i.e. muria), an exaggeration of course, but based on fact. A catalogue of such of his writings as were once extant in Syriac translations is given by Abdisho, Nestorian metropolitan of Nisibis, AD 1318 (J. S. Assem. Bibl. Orient. iii.i. pp. 30 seq.). These Syriac translations filled 41 tomes. Only one whole work remains.

His commentary on the minor prophets has been preserved and was published by Mai (Rome, 1825–1832) and Wegnern. It is noteworthy for its independence of earlier hermeneutical authorities and Theodore's reluctance to admit a Christological reference. It is marked by his usual defects of style; it is nevertheless a considerable monument of his expository power, and the best illustration we possess of the Antiochene method of interpreting Old Testament prophecy.

A fortunate discovery in the 19th century gave us a complete Latin translation of the commentary on Galatians and the nine following epistles, which were published in two volumes by Henry Barclay Swete (Cambridge: 1880, 1882). The Latin, apparently the work of an African churchman of the time of the Fifth council, abounds in colloquial and semi-barbarous forms; the version is not always careful, and sometimes almost hopelessly corrupt (published by Cambridge University Press, 1880–1882). But this translation gives us the substance of Theodore's interpretation of the apostle Paul, and so we have a typical commentary from his pen on a considerable portion of each Testament.

Theodore's commentaries on the rest of the Bible have survived only in quotations and excerpts. His commentary on Genesis is cited by Cosmas Indicopleustes, John Philoponus, and Photius (Cod. 3, 8). Latin fragments are found in the Acts of the second council of Constantinople, and an important collection of Syriac fragments from the Nitrian manuscripts of the British Museum was published by Dr. Eduard Sachau (Th. Mops. Fragm. Syriaca, Lips. 1869, pp. 1–21). Photius, criticizing the style of this work in words more or less applicable to all the remains of Theodore, notices the writer's opposition to the allegorical method of interpretation. Ebedjesu was struck by the care and elaboration bestowed upon the work.

The printed fragments of his commentaries on the Psalms, in Greek and Latin, fill 25 columns in Migne. More recently attention has been called to a Syriac version (Baethgen), and new fragments of a Latin version and of the original Greek have been printed. His preference for historically sensitive interpretation led him to deny the application to Christ of all but three or four of the Psalms usually regarded as Messianic. Evidently, he later came to regard the book as somewhat hasty and premature.

Besides pieces of his commentaries on books from the Old and New Testament, we have fragments or notices of his writings on various topics. Chief amongst these, and first in point of time, was his treatise in fifteen books, on the Incarnation. According to Gennadius (de Vir. Ill. 12) it was directed against the Apollinarians and Eunomians, and written while the author was yet a presbyter of Antioch. Gennadius adds an outline of the contents. After a logical and scriptural demonstration of the truth and perfection of each of the natures in Christ, Theodore deals more at length with the Sacred Manhood. In book 14, he discusses the subject of the Trinity and the relation of the creation to the Divine. Large fragments of this treatise have been collected from various quarters. None of the remains of Theodore throw such important light upon his Christology.

Works that have not survived as well include: his de Apollinario et eius Haeresi and other polemics against Apollinarianism; and a separate polemic against Eunomius of Cyzicus, professing to be a defense of Basil of Caesarea. Photius mentions that Theodore wrote three books on "Persian Magic" where he not only attacked Zoroastrianism, but also betrayed his "Nestorian" views and advocated the notion of the eventual restoration of sinners.

Ebedjesu includes in his list "two tomes on the Holy Spirit", probably a work directed against the heresy of the Pneumatomachi; and "two tomes against him who asserts that sin is inherent in human nature." The last works were directed at Jerome though they did not accurately represent his positions since Theodore was not personally acquainted with his writings, but relied on information provided by Julian of Eclanum. Julian's Ad Florum, a polemic against Augustine, and Theodore's works against Jerome used many of the same arguments.

Lastly, Leontius intimates that Theodore wrote a portion of a liturgy; "not content with drafting a new creed, he sought to impose upon the church a new Anaphora". The Hallowing of Theodore of Mopsuestia, an East Syriac liturgy ascribed to "Mar Teodorus the Interpreter" is still used by the East Syriac Rite Churches for a third of the year, from Advent to Palm Sunday. The proanaphoral and post-communion portions are supplied by the older liturgy "of the Apostles" (so called), the anaphora only being peculiar. Internal evidence confirms the judgment of Dr. Neale, who regards it as a genuine work of Theodore.

His lost work on the incarnation was discovered in 1905 in a Syriac translation in the mountains of northern Iraq in a Nestorian monastery. The manuscript was acquired by the scholar-archbishop Addai Scher and placed in his episcopal library at Seert. Unfortunately it was lost in the destruction of that library by Turkish troops during the Assyrian genocide in 1915, without ever being photographed or copied, so is today lost.

== Sources ==
- Anastos, Milton V. (1951). "The Immutability of Christ and Justinian's Condemnation of Theodore of Mopsuestia". Dumbarton Oaks Papers. 6: 123–160. doi:10.2307/1291085. JSTOR 1291085.
- Baur, Chrysostom (1912). "Theodore of Mopsuestia". The Catholic Encyclopedia. Vol. 14. New York: Robert Appleton Company.
- Bultmann, Rudolf (1984). Die Exegese des Theodor von Mopsuestia (in German). Stuttgart: Kohlhammer.
- Chesnut, Roberta C. (1978). "The Two Prosopa in Nestorius' Bazaar of Heracleides". The Journal of Theological Studies. 29 (2): 392–409. doi:10.1093/jts/XXIX.2.392. JSTOR 23958267.
- Daley, Brian E. (2009). "The Persons in God and the Person of Christ in Patristic Theology: An Argument for Parallel Development". God in Early Christian Thought. Leiden-Boston: Brill. pp. 323–350. ISBN 978-9004174122.
- Gerber, Simon (2000). Theodor von Mopsuestia und das Nicänum: Studien zu den katechetischen Homilien. Vigiliae christianae Supplements (in German). Vol. 51. Leiden: Brill.
- Grillmeier, Aloys (1975) [1965]. Christ in Christian Tradition: From the Apostolic Age to Chalcedon (451) (2nd revised ed.). Louisville: Westminster John Knox Press. ISBN 9780664223014.
- Kalantzis, George (2010). "Single Subjectivity and the Prosopic Union in Cyril of Alexandria and Theodore of Mopsuestia". Studia Patristica. 47: 59–64. ISBN 9789042923744.
- Loon, Hans van (2009). The Dyophysite Christology of Cyril of Alexandria. Leiden-Boston: Basil BRILL. ISBN 978-9004173224.
- Malavasi, Giulio (2014). "The Involvement of Theodore of Mopsuestia in the Pelagian Controversy: A Study of Theodore's Treatise Against Those Who Say that Men Sin by Nature and Not by Will". Augustiniana: 228–260.
- McKenzie, John L. (1958). "Annotations on the Christology of Theodore of Mopsuestia" (PDF). Theological Studies. 19 (3): 345–373. doi:10.1177/004056395801900302. S2CID 157064109. Archived from the original (PDF) on 2022-03-20.
- McLeod, Frederick G. (2005). The Roles of Christ's Humanity in Salvation: Insights from Theodore of Mopsuestia. Washington: COA Press. ISBN 9780813213965.
- McLeod, Frederick G. (2009). Theodore of Mopsuestia. London: Routledge. ISBN 9781134079285.
- McLeod, Frederick G. (2010). "Theodore of Mopsuestia's Understanding of Two Hypostaseis and Two Prosopa Coinciding in One Common Prosopon". Journal of Early Christian Studies. 18 (3): 393–424. doi:10.1353/earl.2010.0011. S2CID 170594639.
- Meyendorff, John (1989). Imperial Unity and Christian Divisions: The Church 450–680 A.D. Crestwood, NY: St. Vladimir's Seminary Press. ISBN 9780881410563.
- Mingana, Alphonse (2009). Commentary of Theodore of Mopsuestia on the Nicene Creed. Woodbrooke Studies. Vol. 5. Piscataway, NJ: Gorgias Press. doi:10.31826/9781463214234. ISBN 978-1-4632-1423-4.
- Mingana, Alphonse (2009). Commentary of Theodore of Mopsuestia on the Lord's Prayer and on the Sacraments of Baptism and the Eucharist. Woodbrooke Studies. Vol. 6. Piscataway, NJ: Gorgias Press. doi:10.31826/9781463214258. ISBN 978-1-4632-1425-8.
- Norris, Richard A., ed. (1980). The Christological Controversy. Minneapolis: Fortess Press. ISBN 9780800614119.
- Pásztori-Kupán, István (2006). Theodoret of Cyrus. London & New York: Routledge. ISBN 9781134391769.
- Perhai, Richard J. (2015). Antiochene Theoria in the Writings of Theodore of Mopsuestia and Theodoret of Cyrus. Minneapolis: Fortress Press. ISBN 9781451488005.
- Riches, Aaron (2009). Ecce Homo: On the Divine Unity of Christ. Grand Rapids, Michigan: William B. Eerdmans. ISBN 9780802872319.
- Soro, Bawai (2007). The Church of the East: Apostolic and Orthodox. San Jose: Adiabene Publications. ISBN 9781604025149.
