= Bardaisan =

Syrian theologian and writer (154–222)

Bardaisan (11 July 154 – 222 AD; Syriac: ܒܪ ܕܝܨܢ, Bar Dayṣān; also Bardaiṣan), known in Arabic as ibn Dayṣān (Arabic: ابن ديصان) and in Latin as Bardesanes, was a Syriac-speaking Christian writer and teacher with a Gnostic background, and founder of the Bardaisanites.

A scientist, scholar, astrologer, philosopher, hymnwriter, and poet, Bardaisan was also renowned for his knowledge of India, on which he wrote a book, now lost. According to the early Christian historian Eusebius, Bardaisan was at one time a follower of the Gnostic Valentinus, but later opposed Valentinian Gnosticism and also wrote against Marcionism.

== Biography ==
=== Early life and education ===
Bardaisan (Syriac: ܒܪ ܕܝܨܢ bar Daiṣān "son of the Daysan") was a Syriac author born on 11 July 154 in Edessa, Osroene, which, in those days, was alternately under the influence of both the Roman Empire and the Parthian Empire. To indicate the city of his birth, his parents called him "Son of the Daysan", the river on which Edessa was situated. He is sometimes also referred to as "the Babylonian" (by Porphyrius); and, on account of his later important activity in Arsacid Armenia, "the Armenian", (by Hippolytus of Rome), while Ephrem the Syrian calls him "philosopher of the Arameans" (Syriac: ܦܝܠܘܣܘܦܐ ܕܐܖ̈ܡܝܐ, romanized: Filosofā d-Arāmāyē). Some sources refer to his high birth and wealth; according to Michael the Syrian, Bardaisan's parents had fled Persia and Sextus Julius Africanus reports that he was of the Parthian nobility. His parents, Nuhama and Nahshiram, must have been people of rank, for their son was educated with a prince of Osroene, possibly the later Abgar VIII. Africanus says that he saw Bardaisan, with bow and arrow, mark the outline of a boy's face with his arrows on a shield which the boy held.

Owing to political disturbances in Edessa, Bardaisan and his parents moved for a while to Hierapolis (now Manbij), a strong centre of Babylonianism. Here, the boy was brought up in the house of a priest named Anuduzbar. In this school he learnt all the intricacies of Babylonian astrology, a training that permanently influenced his mind and proved the bane of his later life. At the age of twenty-five he happened to hear the homilies of Hystaspes, the Bishop of Edessa, received instruction, was baptized, and even admitted to the diaconate or the priesthood. "Priesthood", however, may merely imply that he ranked as one of the college of presbyters, because Bardaisan remained in the world and had a son called Harmonius, who according to Sozomen's Ecclesiastical History, was "deeply versed in Grecian erudition, and was the first to subdue his native tongue to meters and musical laws; these verses he delivered to the choirs". When Abgar VIII ascended the throne (179), Bardaisan took his place at court. While a sincere Christian, he was clearly no ascetic, but dressed in finery "with berylls and caftan", according to Ephrem, one of his critics.

=== Preaching activity ===
Bardaisan had an important share in Christianizing the city and possibly converted Abgar VIII to Christianity (probably after 202, i.e. after his visit and honourable reception at Rome). Both king and philosopher laboured to create the first Christian state. He showed great literary activity against Valentinus (of whom Eusebius of Caesarea says Bardaisan was once a follower) and Marcion.

Alternatively, Epiphanius of Salamis and Bar Hebraeus assert that he was first an orthodox Christian and only afterwards became an adept of Valentinus, even creating his own heterodox Christian dogma (Bardaisanism) by mixing its doctrines with Babylonian astrology. Bardaisan has often been described as a Gnostic who denied the resurrection of the body, and the works of Ephrem the Syrian suggest that he explained the origin of the world by a process of emanation from the supreme God whom he called the Father of the Living. As a result, his teachings would form the basis of the Manichaeism and later of the batini sects of Shia Islam. Bardaisan and his movement were subjected to critical polemics that claimed, probably falsely, that he became a Valentinian Gnostic out of disappointed ambitions in the Christian Church. In particular, he was vigorously combated by Ephrem the Syrian who mentioned him in his hymns:

And if he thinks he has said the last thing
He has reached heathenism,
O Bar-Daisan,
Son of the River Daisan,
Whose mind is liquid like his name!

This view has come under criticism as these sources likely quote later Bardaisanites, whereas Eusebius and Porphyry are known to quote directly from authentic fragments of Bardaisan's work. Sozomen specifically reports that Bardaisan taught about palingenesis (παλιγγενεσίας), that is the rebirth of physical bodies, and in his authentic fragments (which includes a treatise on the resurrection) Bardaisan affirms the resurrection of the body but believed it to be a transformation from a corruptible body into an incorruptible body, which is what he meant by "spiritual bodies" elsewhere. While some Bardaisanites after the rise of Manichaeism considered the creation of bodies to be necessarily evil, Bardaisan himself only considered bodies to be sinful if they were mortal and that "the body of resurrection and the body humans had prior to the fall is a body created from pure matter without any mixture with darkness". Bardaisan himself was not dualistic but monistic, in that he considered God to exist and evil not to, "and those who are in evil are in weakness and not in force".

Nevertheless, criticism about Bardaisan's belief in seven ousiai (ουσιαι) or ʿitye (substances) that pre-existed Creation, from which God fashioned everything, was more accurate and may have put Bardaisan beyond the bounds of mainstream orthodoxy. "Bardaisan refers only to the elements as ʿitye, not to plants or animals", though he also uses the term to refer to the seven planets. Even so, Bardaisan clearly described these celestial beings as created beings subordinate to God.

=== Encounter with religious men from India ===
Porphyry states that on one occasion at Edessa, Bardaisan interviewed an Indian deputation of holy men (Ancient Greek: Σαρμαναίοι "śramaṇas") who had been sent to the Roman emperor Elagabalus or another Severan emperor, and questioned them as to the nature of Indian religion. The encounter is described in Porphyry De abstin., iv, 17 and Stobaeus (Eccles., iii, 56, 141):

For the polity of the Indians being distributed into many parts, there is one tribe among them of men divinely wise, whom the Greeks are accustomed to call Gymnosophists. But of these there are two sects, one of which the Bramins preside over, the Samanaeans the other. The race of the Bramins, however, receive divine wisdom of this kind by succession, in the same manner as the priesthood. But the Samanaeans are elected, and consist of those who wish to possess divine knowledge. And the particulars respecting them are the following, as the Babylonian Bardaisan narrates, who lived in the times of our fathers, and was familiar with those Indians who, together with Damadamis, were sent to Caesar. All the Bramins originate from one stock; for all of them are derived from one father and one mother. But the Samanaeans are not the offspring of one family, being, as we have said, collected from every nation of Indians.

— Porphyry De abstin., IV

=== Exile and death ===
Eventually, after 353 years of existence, the Osrhoenic kingdom came to an end by the Romans under Caracalla. Taking advantage of the anti-Christian faction in Edessa, the Romans captured Abgar IX and sent him in chains to Rome. Though he was urged by a friend of Caracalla to apostatize, Bardaisan stood firm, saying that he feared not death, as he would in any event have to undergo it, even though he should now submit to the emperor. At the age of sixty-three he was forced to take refuge in the fortress of Ani in Armenia and tried to preach there, but with little success. He also composed a history of the Armenian kings. He died at the age of sixty-eight, either at Ani or at Edessa. According to Michael the Syrian, Bardaisan had besides Harmonius two other sons, called Abgarun and Hasdu.

=== Bardaisanite school ===
The followers of Bardaisan (the Bardaisanites) continued his teachings in a sect of the 2nd century deemed heretical by later Christians. Bardaisan's son, Harmonius, is considered to have strayed farther from the path of orthodoxy. Educated at Athens, he added to the Babylonian astrology of his father Greek ideas concerning the soul, the birth and destruction of bodies and a sort of metempsychosis.

A certain Marinus, a follower of Bardaisan and a dualist, who is addressed in the "Dialogue of Adamantius", held the doctrine of a twofold primeval being; for the devil, according to him is not created by God. He was also a Docetist, as he denied Christ's birth of a woman. Bardaisan's form of gnosticism influenced Manichaeism.

Ephrem the Syrian's zealous efforts to suppress this powerful heresy were not entirely successful. Rabbula, Bishop of Edessa in 431–432, found it flourishing everywhere. Its existence in the seventh century is attested by Jacob of Edessa; in the eighth by George, Bishop of the Arabs; in the tenth by the historian al-Masudi; and even in the twelfth by al-Shahrastani. Bardaisanism seems to have merged first into Valentinianism and then into common Manichaeism.

== Doctrine ==
Various opinions have been formed as to the real doctrine of Bardesanes. As early as Hippolytus (Philosophumena, VI, 50) his doctrine was described as a variety of Valentinianism, the most popular form of Gnosticism. Adolf Hilgenfeld in 1864 defended this view, based mainly on extracts from St. Ephrem, who devoted his life to combating Bardaisanism in Edessa. However, it has been argued that the strong and fervent expressions of St. Ephrem against the Bardaisanites of his day are not a fair criterion of the doctrine of their master. The extraordinary veneration of his own countrymen, the very reserved and half-respectful allusion to him in the early Fathers, and above all the "Book of the Laws of the Countries" suggest a milder view of Bardaisan's aberrations.

Like the Early Christians, Bardaisan believed in an Almighty God, Creator of heaven and earth, whose will is absolute, and to whom all things are subject. God endowed man with freedom of will to work out his salvation and allowed the world to be a mixture of good and evil, light and darkness. All things, even those we now consider inanimate, have a measure of liberty. In all of them the light has to overcome the darkness.

Al-Shahrastani states: "The followers of Daisan believe in two elements, light and darkness. The light causes the good, deliberately and with free will; the darkness causes the evil, but by force of nature and necessity. They believe that light is a living thing, possessing knowledge, might, perception and understanding; and from it movement and life take their source; but that darkness is dead, ignorant, feeble, rigid and soulless, without activity and discrimination; and they hold that the evil within them is the outcome of their nature and is done without their co-operation".

He apparently denied the resurrection of the body, although he believed Christ's body was endowed with incorruptibility as with a special gift. Bardaisan postulated that after six thousand years this Earth would have an end, and a world without evil would take its place.

Bardaisan also thought the sun, moon and planets were living beings, to whom, under God, the government of this world was largely entrusted; and though man was free, he was strongly influenced for good or for evil by the constellations. According to St. Ephrem, Sun and Moon were considered male and female principles, and the ideas of heaven amongst the Bardaisanites were not without an admixture of sensuality (or "obscenities"). Led by the fact that "spirit" is feminine in Syriac, Bardaisan might have held unorthodox views on the Trinity.

Bardaisan's cosmology and commentary on it only survives in much later sources, but can be outlined as follows. The world began with the four pure and uncreated elements of light, wind, fire, water, respectively located in East, West, South, North (and are each able to move throughout their own, individual regions). Above the plane on which these four pure elements rest is the Lord, and below is the darkness. At one time and by chance, the four pure elements exceeded their boundaries and began to mix. Taking up the opportune chance, darkness also mixed with them. Distressed, the elements appeal to God to separate the darkness from them, but God is only partially successful in this procedure. The Lord uses the mix to create the world, but the remaining darkness in the mix acts as the cause of evil in the world since then and until today. The world is allotted a period of 6,000 years to exist. Purifications through conception and birth take place, but at the end of the allotted period for the Earth, a definitive purification will take place that will expunge darkness from the world.

Patristics scholar Ilaria Ramelli has argued that Bardaisan may have been one of the first Christian supporters of apokatastasis (universal restoration), citing especially the following passage in Bardaisan's Book of the Laws of Countries as evidence for his belief in this doctrine:

There will come a time when even this capacity for harm that remains in [mankind] will be brought to an end by the instruction that will obtain in a different arrangement of things. And, once that new world will be constituted, all evil movements will cease, all rebellions will come to an end, and the fools will be persuaded, and the lacks will be filled, and there will be safety and peace, as a gift of the Lord of all natures.

== Writings ==
Bardaisan apparently was a voluminous author. Though nearly all his works have perished, references to the following survive:

- Dialogues against Marcion and Valentinus.
- Dialogue "Against Fate" addressed to an Antoninus. Whether this Antoninus is merely a friend of Bardaisan or a Roman emperor and, in the latter case, which of the Antonines is meant, is a matter of controversy. It is also uncertain whether this dialogue is identical with "The Book of the Laws of the Countries", of which later on.
- A "Book of Psalms", 150 in number, in imitation of David's Psalter. These psalms became famous in the history of Edessa; their words and melodies lived for generations on the lips of the people. Only when St. Ephrem composed hymns in the same pentasyllabic metre and had them sung to the same tunes as the psalms of Bardaisan, did the latter gradually lose favour. A few of Bardaisan's hymns probably survive in the Gnostic Acts of Thomas; the Hymn of the Pearl (or "Hymn on the Soul"); the "Espousals of Wisdom"; the consecratory prayer at Baptism and at Holy Communion. Of these only the "Hymn of the Pearl" is generally acknowledged to be by Bardesanes, the authorship of the others is doubtful.
- Astrologico-theological treatises, in which his peculiar tenets were expounded. They are referred to by St. Ephrem, and amongst them was a treatise on light and darkness. A fragment of an astronomical work by Bardaisan was preserved by George, Bishop of the Arab tribes, and republished by Nau.
- A "History of Armenia". Moses of Chorene states that Bardaisan, "having taken refuge in the fortress of Ani, read there the temple records in which also the deeds of kings were chronicled; to these he added the events of his own time. He wrote all in Syriac, but his book was afterwards translated into Greek". Though the correctness of this statement is not quite above suspicion, it probably has a foundation in fact.
- "An Account of India". Bardaisan obtained his information from the Indian śramaṇas (wandering ascetic) ambassadors to the Roman Emperor Elagabalus. A few extracts are preserved by Porphyry and Stobaeus.
- "Book of the Laws of the Countries". This famous dialogue, the oldest remnant not only of Bardaisanite learning, but even of Syriac literature, aside from a translation of the Bible, is not by Bardaisan himself, but by a certain Philip, his disciple. The main speaker, however, in the dialogue is Bardaisan. Excerpts of this work are extant in Greek in Eusebius and in Caesarius; in Latin in the "Recognitions" of Pseudo-Clement A complete Syriac text was first published from a sixth- or seventh-century manuscript in the British Museum by William Cureton, in his Spicilegium Syriacum (London, 1855), and by Nau. It is disputed whether the original was in Syriac or in Greek; Nau is decided in favour of the former. Against a questioning disciple called Abida, Bardaisan seeks to show that man's actions are not entirely necessitated by Fate, as the outcome of stellar combinations. From the fact that the same laws, customs and manners often prevail amongst all persons living in a certain district, or through locally scattered living under the same traditions, Bardaisan endeavours to show that the position of the stars at the birth of individuals can have but little to do with their subsequent conduct, hence the title "Book of the Laws of the Countries".
- "Gospel of Bardesanes".

== See also ==
- Gnosticism
- History of Gnosticism
- List of Gnostic sects

== Sources ==
- This article incorporates text from a publication now in the public domain: Arendzen, John (1913). "Bardesanes and Bardesanites". In Herbermann, Charles (ed.). Catholic Encyclopedia. New York: Robert Appleton Company.
- Sebastian Brock, Bardaisan, in Sebastian Brock et al. (eds.), Gorgias Encyclopedic Dictionary of Syriac Heritage, Piscataway, Gorgias Press, 2011
- H.J.W. Drijvers, Bardaisan of Edessa, Van Assen, Gorcum, 1966 (reprint: Piscataway, Gorgias Press, 2014, with a new introduction by Jan Willem Drijvers and an updated bibliography)
- Griffith, Sidney H. (2002). "Christianity in Edessa and the Syriac-Speaking World: Mani, Bar Daysan, and Ephraem, the Struggle for Allegiance on the Aramean Frontier". Journal of the Canadian Society for Syriac Studies. 2: 5–20. doi:10.31826/jcsss-2009-020104. S2CID 166480216. Archived from the original on 11 December 2018.
- Klijn, Albertus Frederik Johannes (1962). The Acts of Thomas. Vol. 5. Brill Archive.
- McLean, Norman (1911). "Bardaiṣān" . In Chisholm, Hugh (ed.). Encyclopædia Britannica. Vol. 3 (11th ed.). Cambridge University Press. pp. 395–396.
- Mitchell, Charles W., ed. (1912). S. Ephraim's Prose Refutations of Mani, Marcion, and Bardaisan. Vol. 1. London: Text and Translation Society.
- Mitchell, Charles W.; Bevan, Anthony A.; Burkitt, Francis C., eds. (1921). S. Ephraim's Prose Refutations of Mani, Marcion, and Bardaisan. Vol. 2. London: Text and Translation Society.
- Ilaria Ramelli, Bardaisan of Edessa: A Reassessment of the Evidence and a New Interpretation, Piscataway, Gorgias Press, 2009
- Conomos, Dimitri (2001). "Bardaisan". Grove Music Online. Oxford, England: Oxford University Press. doi:10.1093/gmo/9781561592630.article.02030. ISBN 978-1-56159-263-0. (subscription, Wikipedia Library access or UK public library membership required)
- Possekel, Ute (1999). Evidence of Greek philosophical concepts in the writings of Ephrem the Syrian. Peeters Publishers.
- Possekel, Ute (2019). "Bardaisan's Influence on Late Antique Christianity". Hugoye: Journal of Syriac Studies. 21 (1): 81–126. doi:10.31826/hug-2019-210105. S2CID 214625075.
- Ramelli, Ilaria L. E. (2015). "Revisiting Aphrahat's Sources: Beyond Scripture?". Parole de l'Orient. 41: 367–397.
- Ramelli, Ilaria L. E. (2009). "Origen, Bardaiṣan, and the origin of universal salvation". Harvard Theological Review. 102 (2): 135–168. doi:10.1017/S0017816009000728. S2CID 163137985.
