= Das Väterbuch =

Collection of saint legends

Das Väterbuch is a Middle High German legendary, or collection of saints' legends, written in verse. It is the oldest work of its type in German. It is a long work of 41,540 lines.

The anonymous poet is probably the same person who wrote Das Passional. He seems to have been a cleric of the Teutonic Order writing for the benefit of its members. The Väterbuch was completed around 1280. It is based on and largely translated from Latin sources. The poet cites the Vitae Patrum, but also made use of the Legenda Aurea. Like its source material, it mainly covers the lives of the Desert Fathers of Egypt.
