= The Book of the Laws of the Countries =

3rd-century Syriac dialogue by Bardaisan

The Book of the Laws of the Countries is a 3rd-century dialogue work of Syriac literature between the theologian and writer Bardaisan with his students. The Book of the Laws deals with the issue of free will and its relation to fate, and astrology. It is a product of the School of Bardaisan of Edessa in the Kingdom of Osroene. The account of the flood at Edessa in 201 A. D. preserved in the Chronicle of Edessa, fragments of Bardaisan's work preserved by later polemicists and the Book of the Laws from the School of Bardaisan are all from the early third century and of assured Edessene origin, providing the earliest unambiguous evidence for Christianity in Edessa.
