= Prayer of Saint Ephrem =

Eastern Christian text with variants

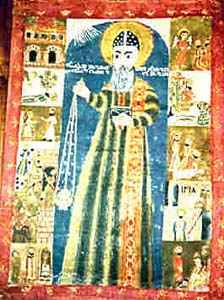
Icon of Saint Ephrem the Syrian (Meryem Ana Kilesesi, Diyarbakır, Turkey).

"The Prayer of Saint Ephrem" (Greek: Ἐὐχὴ τοῦ Ὁσίου Ἐφραίμ, Efchí toú Osíou Efrem), is a prayer attributed to Saint Ephrem the Syrian and used during the Great Lent by the Eastern Orthodox and Byzantine Catholic Churches. In the Byzantine tradition, this prayer is considered to be the most succinct summation of the spirit of Great Lent and is hence the Lenten prayer par excellence, prayed during all Lenten weekday services. There are two versions of the prayer currently in use, reflecting liturgical Greek and Slavonic uses. Modern translations have been produced from both Greek and Slavonic, but some attempt to combine the two.

== Greek version ==
Κύριε καὶ Δέσποτα τῆς ζωῆς μου, πνεῦμα ἀργίας, περιεργίας, φιλαρχίας, καὶ ἀργολογίας μή μοι δῷς.

Πνεῦμα δὲ σωφροσύνης, ταπεινοφροσύνης, ὑπομονῆς, καὶ ἀγάπης χάρισαί μοι τῷ σῷ δούλῳ.

Ναί, Κύριε Βασιλεῦ, δώρησαι μοι τοῦ ὁρᾶν τὰ ἐμὰ πταίσματα, καὶ μὴ κατακρίνειν τὸν ἀδελφόν μου, ὅτι εὐλογητὸς εἶ, εἰς τοὺς αἰῶνας τῶν αἰώνων. Ἀμήν.

In English, this may be translated:

O Lord and Master of my life, a spirit of idleness, curiosity, ambition, and idle talking; give me not.

But a spirit of chastity, humility, patience, and love, bestow upon me, Thy servant.

Yea, O Lord King: grant me to see mine own failings, and not to condemn others; for blessed art Thou unto the ages of ages. Amen.

This Greek version is the form of the prayer found in the current liturgical books of the Greek Orthodox Church and all those churches that utilise Greek or Arabic in their services. Early Greek manuscripts preserve several variant texts, however, including the reading φιλαργυρίας (philargyrias, "love of money") in place of φιλαρχίας (philarchias, "love of power"), which was taken up in the first Slavonic translations. It is difficult to know which form is more ancient, since both vices are serious afflictions for both monastic and lay Christians.

The Greek word σωφροσύνης (sōphrosynēs) in the second line is often translated in English as 'chastity.' However, this is a highly problematic archaism, since, in modern English, 'chastity' refers almost exclusively to sexual continence. The Greek word is much broader in meaning and carries the sense of soundness of mind, discretion, and prudence. Therefore, the prayer asks in the second line for a restoration to Christian wholeness and integrity, foreshadowing the petition of the third line that the supplicant might have the temptation to judge others removed from them (cf. Matt. 7:1–5). It is possible that the choice to translate σωφροσύνης as 'chastity' reflects both the affection for the Cranmerian prose of the Anglican Book of Common Prayer present in some anglophone Orthodox (which frequently leads to an ambiguity of meaning in liturgical and scriptural texts, as exemplified here) and also the presupposition that a concern for sexual purity is predominant in the Orthodox tradition.

Sometimes the phrase "idle talk" is substituted by the Latinate word vaniloquence, which carries about the same meaning.

== Church Slavonic versions ==
=== Pre-Nikonian ===
In the earliest Church Slavonic translations, the prayer was rendered:

Господи и владико животѹ моемѹ, духъ оунынїѧ, небрежεнїѧ, срεбролюбїѧ и празднословїѧ ѿжεни ѿ мεнε.

Духъ же цѣломѹдрїѧ, смиренїѧ, терпѣнїѧ и любве дарѹй ми рабѹ твоемѹ.

Ей Господи Царю, даждь ми зрѣти моѧ согрѣшенїѧ, и еже не ωсуждати брата моегω, якω благословенъ еси во вѣки. Аминь.

In English, this is:

O Lord and Master of my life, take from me a spirit of despondency, sloth, love of money, and idle talk.

But give to me, your servant, a spirit of sober-mindedness, humility, patience, and love.

Yes, O Lord and King, grant me to see my own sins and not to judge my brother, since you are blessed to the ages. Amen.

There are two main differences in the first line between the Greek text given above and the Slavonic text given here. First, the Greek reads "μή μοι δῷς," meaning "grant me not," whereas the Slavonic has "ωтжεни ѿ мεнε," meaning "take from me." The Greek text unambiguously implies that God is the one who grants every character of spirit or breath (πνεῦμα), and the supplicant therefore requests that God give a spirit characterized not by vice (line 1) but by virtue (line 2). The supplicant effectively asks God to lighten their burden (cf. Matt. 11:28–30). The Slavonic text, however, could be read as asking God to replace one kind of spirit or breath with another, with the implication that the first kind of spirit (line 1) does not come from God to begin with. This could lead to a dualist reading of the prayer, opposing the unvirtuous 'spirit of man' to the virtuous 'spirit of God.' The Greek text seems better to reflect the monastic tradition, as expressed by writers such as the fifth-century Abba Isaiah of Scetis in his Ascetic Discourses, that all passions are ultimately divine gifts with a sacred purpose. The second main difference is that, where the Greek has περιεργίας (periergia meaning 'idle curiosity' or 'meddling'), the Slavonic has небрежεнїѧ (nebrezheniya) meaning 'negligence,' 'indifference,' or 'despondency,' which would be ἀκηδία (akêdia) in Greek—the classic monastic sin. A third minor difference is the transposition of terms in the first line. Whereas the Greek consistently reads "ἀργίας, περιεργίας" ('sloth, meddling'), the Slavonic reads "оунынїѧ, небрежεнїѧ" ('despondency [in place of meddling], sloth'). Despondency (оунынїѧ) remained at the head of the list of vices until the order was conformed to the Greek text during Nikon's reforms. It seems likely that the differences between the Greek and Slavonic texts reflect the fact that the Slavonic text was prepared from a different Greek text than the one currently used, but this has yet to be demonstrated definitively.

This Slavonic version was superseded in the Russia Orthodox Church in 1656, following the liturgical reforms of Patriarch Nikon, but remains in use among the Old Believers today.

=== Kievan version of 1639 ===
Господи и владыко живота моегω, духъ оунынїѧ, небрежεнїѧ, любоначалїѧ и празднословїѧ ѿжεни ѿ мεнε.

Духъ же цѣломѹдрїѧ, смиреномѹдрїѧ, терпѣнїѧ и любве, дарѹй ми рабѹ твоемѹ.

Ей Господи Царю, даждь ми зрѣти моѧ согрѣшенїѧ, и не ωсуждати брата моегω, якω благословенъ еси во вѣки вѣковъ. Аминь.

O Lord and Master of my life, take from me a spirit of despondency, sloth, love of power, and idle talk.

But give to me, your servant, a spirit of sober-mindedness, humility, patience, and love.

Yes, O Lord and King, grant me to see my own sins and not to judge my brother, since you are blessed to the ages of ages. Amen.

This version is to be found in the Liturgicon (Sluzhebnik) or Priest's Service Book published in Kiev in 1639 by Peter Mohyla. Substantially it is similar to the earlier version, but with some of the case-endings updated, as by that time, use of the dative case (животѹ моемѹ) to mark possession was considered distinctively archaic, and use of the genitive case (живота моегω) felt to be more correct. It retains most of the distinctive differences that the earlier version has from the Greek, with none of the more drastic changes that may be found in the next version.

This version was once used throughout the Kievan metropolia, as well as in the Orthodox Churches of Central Europe (Ukraine, Poland, Hungary, Slovakia, Austria and so on), but later dropped out of use, and the next version adopted. It is currently only used (either in the original Slavonic or in vernacular translations) by those churches that use the Ruthenian recension—the Ukrainian Greek Catholic Church, the Ruthenian Greek Catholic Church, the Belarusian Greek Catholic Church, the Hungarian Greek Catholic Church, and the Slovak Greek Catholic Church.

=== Nikonian version of 1656 ===
Господи и владыко живота моегω, духъ праздности, оунынїѧ, любоначалїѧ и празднословїѧ не даждь ми.

Духъ же цѣломѹдрїѧ, смиренномѹдрїѧ, терпѣнїѧ и любве, дарѹй ми рабѹ твоемѹ.

Ей Господи Царю, даруй ми зрѣти моѧ прегрѣшенїѧ, и не ωсуждати брата моегω, якω благословенъ еси во вѣки вѣковъ. Аминь.

O Lord and Master of my life, grant me not a spirit of sloth, despondency, love of power, and idle talk.

But give to me, your servant, a spirit of sober-mindedness, humility, patience, and love.

Yes, O Lord and King, grant me to see my own faults and not to judge my brother, since you are blessed to the ages of ages. Amen.

This is the version found in the editions of the liturgical books published in 1656 by Patriarch Nikon of Moscow. It is the form currently in use by the Russian Orthodox Church (both the Moscow Patriarchate and the Russian Orthodox Church Outside Russia), the Ukrainian Orthodox Church, the Belarusian Orthodox Church, the Serbian Orthodox Church, the Bulgarian Orthodox Church, and all other Slavic Orthodox Churches. It differs substantially from the current Greek form of the prayer only in the retention of оунынїѧ ('despondency') in place of περιεργίας ('meddling'). Considering the principles on which Patriarch Nikon's reforms were undertaken, it seems likely that the 1656 text of the prayer was prepared from a Greek text containing the word ἀκηδίας ('despondency') rather than περιεργίας.

An English version of the Prayer of St Ephrem commonly in use in the Orthodox Church in America (which inherited its liturgical practices from the Slavic tradition) maintains the distinction between take from me (line 1) and give to me (line 2) that was eliminated in the 1656 Slavonic translation. This does not appear to reflect a conscious choice of the OCA to return to the Pre-Nikonian text or to imitate the Old Believers, but probably derives from the fact that many OCA parishes were founded by Orthodox (and Byzantine Rite Catholics) from Central Europe who used the Ruthenian Slavonic text of 1639, but with the оунынїѧ and небрежεнїѧ (line 1) inverted to conform to the Nikonian/Greek order.

== Liturgical usage ==
At weekday services during Great Lent, the prayer is prescribed for each of the canonical hours and (in some traditions) at the Divine Liturgy of the Presanctified Gifts.

During the period of the Triodion, the prayer is first recited on Wednesday and Friday only on Cheesefare week and thereafter at every weekday service from vespers on the evening of the Sunday of Forgiveness, the service which begins Great Lent, through Wednesday of Holy Week. The prayer is not said on Saturdays and Sundays (vespers on Sunday evening is of Monday, since the Byzantine liturgical day begins at sunset), because these days are not strict fasting days (oil and wine are always permitted). This means that the weekends retain a festal character, even during the Great Fast, and the Divine Liturgy may be celebrated as usual.

During the Nativity Fast, Dormition Fast and the Apostles' Fast, the lenten order of services may be used when the divine liturgy is not celebrated. In such an instance, the Prayer of St Ephrem is recited then, too.

== Bows and prostrations ==
The prayer is accompanied by bows and prostrations.

Depending upon the rubrics, the prayer is said either once or twice:

- When it is said once, it is divided into three parts, with a prostration after each part.
- When it is said twice (though local practices may vary) it is said the first time with a prostration after each part; then follow a number of either bows or prostrations (either in silence or accompanied by short ejaculatory prayers); and then the prayer is said the second time in its entirety (i.e., not broken up by prostrations) followed by a final prostration.

Current Russian Orthodox practice, as followed in the Moscow Patriarchate and the ROCOR, is to perform twelve metanias (bows from the waist) after the first recitation of the prayer (with three prostrations), saying at each bow, "Боже, ѡчисти мѧ грѣшнаго (грѣшнѹю if one is female)"—"O God, cleanse me a sinner". When the prayer is prayed in the course of a church service, the priest alone says aloud "O God, cleanse me a sinner", as everyone makes bows. In the common usage of ROCOR, the last (twelfth) time he adds, "...и помилѹй мѧ"—"...and have mercy on me." Though this last addition is not written in the service books, it helps all of those present to know that it was the last bow.

The tradition of the Old Believers is similar, but instead of twelve bows in silence, they have thirteen prostrations, each time reciting the Jesus Prayer or the following prayers:

Lord Jesus Christ, Son of God, have mercy on me, a sinner ('Господи Ісусе Христе Сыне Божїй помилѹй мѧ грѣшнаго/грѣшнѹю')

God be merciful to me a sinner. ('Боже милостивъ буди мнѣ грѣшномѹ')

God, cleanse me of my sins and have mercy on me. ('Боже ѡчисти грѣхи моѧ и помилѹй мѧ')

You have created me; Lord, have mercy on me. ('Создавый мѧ Господи, помилѹй')

I have sinned immeasurably; Lord, forgive me. ('Безъ числа согрѣшихъ, Господи прости мѧ')

Lord Jesus Christ, Son of God, have mercy on me, a sinner.

God be merciful to me a sinner.

God, cleanse me of my sins and have mercy on me.

You have created me; Lord, have mercy on me.

I have sinned immeasurably; Lord, forgive me.

God be merciful to me a sinner.

You have created me; Lord, have mercy on me.

I have sinned immeasurably; Lord, forgive me.

The Ruthenian tradition, again, differs slightly, retaining some aspects closely related to Old Believer usage. The 1639 Liturgikon (Sluzhebnik) of Peter Mohyla prescribes twelve waist-bows, repeating the following three lines to make twelve:

God be merciful to me a sinner. ('Боже милостивъ буди мнѣ грѣшномѹ')

God, cleanse me of my sins and have mercy on me. ('Боже ѡчисти грѣхи моѧ и помилѹй мѧ')

I have sinned immeasurably; Lord, forgive me. ('Безъ числа согрѣшихъ, Господи прости мѧ')

== In other languages ==
=== Albanian ===
Zot dhe Mjeshtër i jetës sime, mos më jep frymë përtese, kureshtie, lavdidashje dhe kotësie.

Po falmë frymë urtësie, përunjësie, durimi dhe dashurie.

Vlerësomë, o Zot dhe Mbret, t’i shoh fajet e mia dhe të mos e gjykoj tim vëlla. Se i bekuar je në jetë të jetëve, Amin.

=== Arabic ===
أيها الرب وسيد حياتي اعتقني من روح البطالة والفضول، وحب الرئاسة والكلام البطال

وانعم علي انا عبدك الخاطئ بروح العفة واتضاع الفكر والصبر والمحبة

نعم يا ملكي والهي هب لي ان أعرف ذنوبي وعيوبي والا أدين اخوتي فانك مبارك الى الأبد. آمين

Transliteration: 'Ayūha al-Rābbu wa'sayīd hayāti, a'aataqāni min rūh al-bitalāt wa'l-fūdūli, wahābi al-ri'asāt wa'al-kilām al-bitāl. wa'ineām eāli inā aabdāk al-khāti bi-ruh al-eafat, wa'itidai al-fīkr wa'l-sābr wa'l-mahāba. ya malīki, wa'Allāhi hab li'ān aārif dhabūbi wa'aayubi, wa'īlla udīn ikhwāti, fa'innāk mubarāk illā al-abād. Ameen.

The Arabic version follows the Greek form.

=== Belarusian ===
In the Cyrillic orthography:

Госпадзе і Ўладару жыцьця майго, духа ленасьці, нуды, уладалюбства і марнаслоўя ня дай мне.

Духа чысьціні, пакоры, цярплівасьці і любові дай мне, слузе Твайму.

Так, Госпадзе Ўладару! Дай мне бачыць мае правіны і не асуджаць брата майго, бо Ты блаславёны на вякі вякоў. Амін.

In the Latin orthography:

Hospadzie i Ŭładaru žyćcia majho, ducha lenaści, nudy, uładalubstva i marnasłoŭja nia daj mnie.

Ducha čyścini, pakory, ciaplivaści i lubovi daj mnie, słuzie Tvajmu.

Tak, Hospadzie Ŭładaru! Daj mnie bačyć maje praviny i nie asudžać brata majho, bo Ty błasłaviony na viaki viakoŭ. Amin.

=== Finnish ===
Herra, minun elämäni valtias! Estä minusta laiskuuden, velttouden, vallanhimon ja turhanpuhumisen henki.

Anna minulle, sinun palvelijallesi, sielun puhtauden, nöyryyden, kärsivällisyyden ja rakkauden henki.

Oi, Kuningas ja Herra! Anna minun nähdä rikokseni ja anna, etten veljeäni tuomitsisi, sillä siunattu olet sinä iankaikkisesti. Aamen.

The Finnish translation follows the Greek original.

=== Georgian ===
უფალო და მეუფეო ცხოვრებისა ჩემისაო, სულსა უქმობისასა და მიმომწვლილელობისასა, მთავრობის მოყვარებისასა და ცუდად მეტყველებისასა ნუ მიმცემ მე.

ხოლო სული სიწმიდისა, სიმდაბლისა, მოთმინებისა და სიყვარულისა მომმადლე მე, მონასა შენსა.

ჰე, უფალო, მომანიჭე მე განცდაი თვისთა ცოდვათა და არა განკითხვად ძმისა ჩემისა, რამეთუ კურთხეულ ხარ შენ უკუნისამდე. ამინ

Transcription into the Latin alphabet, with apostrophe for glottalization: upalo da meupeo tskhovrebisa chemisao, sulsa ukmobisasa da mimomts'vlilelobisasa, mtavrobis moqvarebisasa da tsudad met'kvelebisasa nu mimtsem me.

kholo suli sits'midisa, simdablisa, motminebisa da siqvarulisa mommadle me, monasa shensa.

he, upalo, momanich'e me gantsdai tvista tsodvata da ara gank'itkhvad dzmisa chemisa, rametu k'urtkheul xar shen uk'unisamde. amin

=== German ===
Herr und Gebieter meines Lebens, den Geist des Müßiggangs, der Verzagtheit, der Herrschsucht und der Geschwätzigkeit gib mir nicht.

Gib mir hingegen, Deinem Knecht, den Geist der Keuschheit, der Demut, der Geduld und der Liebe.

Ja, Herr und mein König, gib mir, meine eigenen Sünden zu sehen und meinen Bruder nicht zu verurteilen, denn Du bist gesegnet in die Ewigkeit der Ewigkeit. Amen.

=== Hawaiian ===
E ka Haku a me ke Kahu o ko‘u ola! Mai hō mai ia‘u i ka ‘uhane o ka na‘au palaka, ka mana‘o pauaho, ke kuko hewa a me ke kakahili.

Akā naʻe, e hō mai nō na‘e ‘Oe ia‘u, Kāu ‘ōhua, i ka ‘uhane o ke kūkapu, ka ha‘aha‘a, ke ahonui a me ke aloha.

E ka Haku ē, ka Mō‘ī ho‘i! E ‘ae ‘Oe mai ia‘u i ka hiki ke ‘ike i ko‘u mau hewa a me ka hiki ke ho‘ohalahala ‘ole aku i ko‘u hoa kanaka; no ka mea, Nou ka pōmaika‘i mai kēia manawa a mau loa aku no nā kau ā kau. ‘Āmene.

=== Japanese ===
主吾が生命の主宰よ、怠惰と、愁悶と、矜誇と、空談の情を吾に與うる勿れ。

貞操と、謙遜と、忍耐と、愛の情を我爾の僕（婢）に與え給え。

嗚呼主王よ、我に我が罪を見、我が兄弟を議せざるを賜え、蓋爾は世世に崇め讃めらる。「アミン」

Transcription into the Latin alphabet: Shu waga inochino shusaiyo, okotarito, modaeto, hokorito, mudagotono kokoro-o, wareni atauru nakare.

Misaoto, herikudarito, koraeto, ainokokoro-o, ware nannjino bokuhini ataetamae.

Ah shu oyo, wareni waga tumio mi, waga keitei o gisezaruo tamae, kedashi nannjiha yoyoni agamehomeraru. Amin.

=== Polish ===
O Panie i Władco życia mego, nie daj mi ducha lenistwa, zniechęcenia, pożądania władzy i próżnych słów.

Daruj zaś słudze Twemu ducha czystości, pokory, cierpliwości i miłości.

O Panie, Królu, pozwól mi widzieć moje grzechy i nie osądzać brata mego, albowiem błogosławiony jesteś na wieki wieków. Amen

=== Portuguese ===
Ó Senhor e Soberano de minha vida, não me dês um espírito de preguiça, de desânimo*, de ambição ou de vaniloqüência. (Prostração)

Mas um espírito de castidade, de humildade, de paciência e de amor, concedo-mo a mim, Teu servo. (Prostração)

Ó Senhor Rei, concede-me ver os meus pecados e que eu não julgue meu irmão, porquanto és bendito pelos séculos dos séculos. Amém. (Prostração)

- O texto grego tem "curiosidade".

=== Romanian ===
Doamne şi Stăpânul vieţii mele, duhul trândăviei, al grijii de multe, al iubirii de stăpânire şi al grăirii în deşert nu-mi-l da mie

Iar duhul curăţiei, al gândului smerit, al răbdării şi al dragostei dăruieşte-mi mie slugii tale.

Aşa Doamne, Împărate, dăruieşte-mi să-mi văd greşalele mele şi să nu osândesc pe fratele meu, că binecuvântat eşti în vecii vecilor. Amin.

The Romanian text follows the Greek version.

=== Slovak ===
Pane a Vládca môjho života, odním odo mňa ducha znechutenosti, nedbalosti, mocibažnosti a prázdnych rečí.

Daruj mne, svojmu služobníkovi, ducha miernosti, poníženosti, trpezlivosti a lásky.

Áno, Pane a Kráľu, daj, aby som videl vlastné prehrešenia a nepodsudzoval svojho brata, lebo ty si požehnaný na veky vekov. Amen.

A different translation:

Pane a Vládca môjho života, odožeň odo mňa ducha zúfalstva, nedbanlivosti, mocibažnosti a prázdnych rečí.

Daruj mne, tvojmu služobníkovi, ducha čistoty, pokory, trpezlivosti a lásky.

Áno, Pane a Kráľu, daruj mi vidieť vlastné hriechy a neodsudzovať môjho brata, lebo ty si požehnaný na veky vekov, amen.

=== Ukrainian ===
Господи і Владико життя мого, духа млявости, недбайливости, владолюбства й пустослів’я віджени від мене.

Духа же доброчесности і смиренномудрія, терпіння й любови даруй мені, недостойному рабові Твоєму.

Так, Господи Царю, дай мені зріти мої прогрішення і не осуджувати брата мого, бо Ти благословен єси на віки віків. Амінь.

The Ukrainian version appears to follow the Mohyla version closely.
