= Sidney H. Griffith =

American academic (1938–2026)

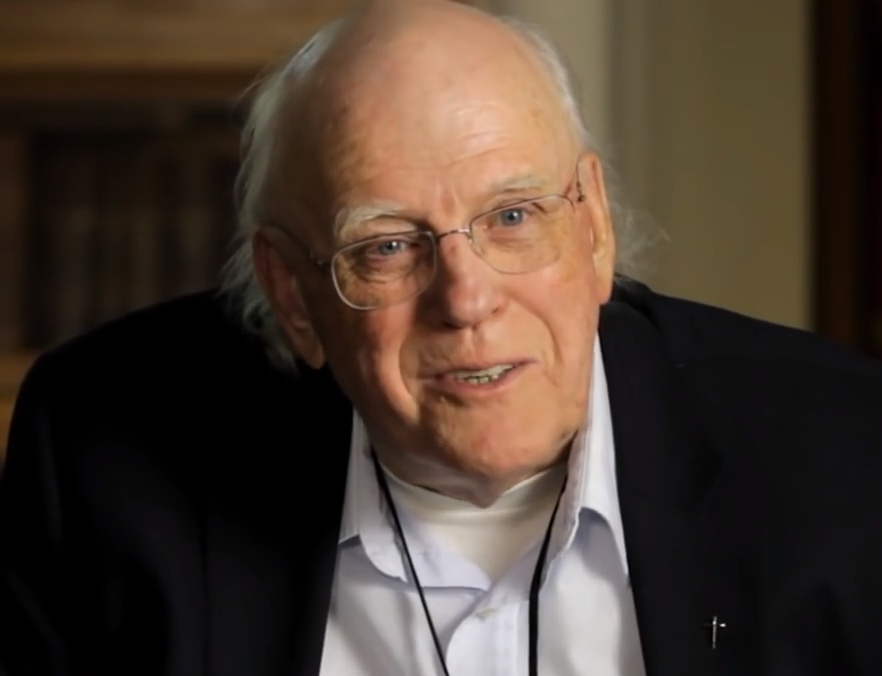
Griffith in 2016

Sidney H. Griffith (1938 – July 19, 2026) was an American academic who was a professor of Early Christian Studies at the Catholic University of America. His main areas of interest were Arabic Christianity, Syriac monasticism, medieval Christian-Muslim encounters, and ecumenical and interfaith dialogue.

== Life and career ==
Griffith began his career when he was ordained a Catholic priest in 1965. He continued his studies and was awarded a licentiate in theology in 1967 from the Catholic University of America. In 1977, he graduated with a Ph.D. from the same university. The subject of the thesis was Syriac and Medieval Arabic. He immediately assumed teaching duties, and in 1984 rose to director of the university's Graduate Program in Early Christian Studies. During his career, he was a visiting professor or fellow at, among other institutions, The Institute for Advanced Studies at The Hebrew University of Jerusalem and Georgetown University. He was a president of three separate professional societies: The North American Patristics Society (1986–1988); The Byzantine Studies Conference (1990–1991); and the American Oriental Society (2007–2008). He published prolifically on Syriac Christianity and Christian Arabs.

His main areas of interest were Arabic Christianity, Syriac monasticism, medieval Christian-Muslim encounters and ecumenical and interfaith dialogue. He served on the advisory board of the journal Collectanea Christiana Orientalia, and gave guest lectures at prestigious institutions.

Griffith died on July 19, 2026.

== Awards ==
In 2009, Griffith was awarded a Rumi Peace Award for his efforts in interfaith dialogue. The same year, his book The Church in the Shadow of the Mosque: Muslims and Christians in the World of Islam was awarded the Albert C. Outler Prize for the best book on ecumenical church history by the American Society of Church History. The book has been widely and approvingly reviewed.

== Works ==
- Griffith, Sidney H. (1986). "Ephraem, the Deacon of Edessa, and the Church of the Empire". Diakonia: Studies in Honor of Robert T. Meyer. Washington: CUA Press. pp. 25–52. ISBN 9780813205960.
- Griffith, Sidney H. (1987). "Ephraem the Syrian's Hymns Against Julian: Meditations on History and Imperial Power". Vigiliae Christianae. 41 (3): 238–266. doi:10.2307/1583993. JSTOR 1583993.
- Griffith, Sidney H. (1987). "Dionysius bar Salibi on the Muslims". IV Symposium Syriacum 1984. Roma: Pontificium Institutum Studiorum Orientalium. pp. 353–365.
- Griffith, Sidney H. (1988). "Jews and Muslims in Christian Syriac and Arabic Texts of the Ninth Century". Jewish History. 3 (1): 65–94. doi:10.1007/BF01667349. JSTOR 20101059. S2CID 159664356.
- Griffith, Sidney H. (1990). "Images of Ephraem: The Syrian Holy Man and His Church". Traditio. 45 (1989-1990): 7–33. doi:10.1017/S0362152900012666. JSTOR 27831238. S2CID 151782759.
  - Griffith, Sidney H. (1999). "Images of Ephraem: The Syrian Holy Man and His Church". Doctrinal Diversity: Varieties of Early Christianity. New York and London: Garland Publishing. pp. 299–325. ISBN 9780815330714.
- Griffith, Sidney H. (1992). Arabic Christianity in the Monasteries of Ninth-Century Palestine. Aldershot: Ashgate. ISBN 9780860783374.
- Griffith, Sidney H. (1992). "Disputes with Muslims in Syriac Christian Texts: From Patriarch John (d. 648) to Bar Hebraeus (d. 1286)". Religionsgespräche im Mittelalter. Wiesbaden: Harrassowitz. pp. 251–273. ISBN 9783447033497.
- Griffith, Sidney H. (1995). Syriac Writers on Muslims and the Religious Challenge of Islam. Kottayam: St. Ephrem Ecumenical Research Institute.
- Griffith, Sidney H. (1995). "Asceticism in the Church of Syria: The Hermeneutics of Early Syrian Monasticism". Asceticism. New York-Oxford: Oxford University Press. pp. 220–245. ISBN 978-0-19-803451-3.
  - Griffith, Sidney H. (1999). "Asceticism in the Church of Syria: The Hermeneutics of Early Syrian Monasticism". Doctrinal Diversity: Varieties of Early Christianity. New York and London: Garland Publishing. pp. 326–351. ISBN 9780815330714.
- Griffith, Sidney H. (1997). Faith Adoring the Mystery: Reading the Bible with St. Ephraem the Syrian. Milwaukee: Marquette University Press. ISBN 9780874625776.
- Griffith, Sidney H. (1997). "From Aramaic to Arabic: The Languages of the Monasteries of Palestine in the Byzantine and Early Islamic Periods". Dumbarton Oaks Papers. 51: 11–31. doi:10.2307/1291760. JSTOR 1291760.
- Griffith, Sidney H. (1998). "A Spiritual Father for the Whole Church: The Universal Appeal of St. Ephraem the Syrian" (PDF). Hugoye: Journal of Syriac Studies. 1 (2): 197–220. doi:10.31826/hug-2010-010113. S2CID 212688360.
- Griffith, Sidney H. (1999). "Setting Right the Church of Syria: Saint Ephraem's Hymns against Heresies". The Limits of Ancient Christianity: Essays on Late Antique Thought and Culture. Ann Arbor: University of Michigan Press. pp. 97–114. ISBN 0472109979.
- Griffith, Sidney H. (1999). "The Marks of the True Church according to Ephraem's Hymns against Heresies". After Bardaisan: Studies on Continuity and Change in Syriac Christianity. Leuven: Peeters Publishers. pp. 125–140. ISBN 9789042907355.
- Griffith, Sidney H. (2000). "Disputing with Islam in Syriac: The Case of the Monk of Bêt Halê and a Muslim Emir" (PDF). Hugoye: Journal of Syriac Studies. 3 (1): 29–54. doi:10.31826/hug-2010-030103. S2CID 212689097.
- Griffith, Sidney H. (2001). "Melkites, Jacobites and the Christological Controversies in Arabic in Third/Ninth-Century Syria". Syrian Christians under Islam: The First Thousand Years. Leiden: Brill. pp. 9–55. ISBN 9004120556.
- Griffith, Sidney H. (2002). The Beginnings of Christian Theology in Arabic: Muslim-Christian Encounters in the Early Islamic Period. Aldershot: Ashgate. ISBN 9780860788898.
- Griffith, Sidney H. (2002). "Christianity in Edessa and the Syriac-Speaking World: Mani, Bar Daysan, and Ephraem, the Struggle for Allegiance on the Aramean Frontier". Journal of the Canadian Society for Syriac Studies. 2: 5–20. doi:10.31826/jcsss-2009-020104. S2CID 212688584. Archived from the original on 2018-12-11.
- Griffith, Sidney H. (2003). "The Doctrina Addai as a Paradigm of Christian Thought in Edessa in the Fifth Century" (PDF). Hugoye: Journal of Syriac Studies. 6 (2): 269–292. doi:10.31826/hug-2010-060111. S2CID 212688514.
- Griffith, Sidney H. (2004). "Beyond the Euphrates in Severan Times: Mani, Bar Daysan, and the Struggle for Allegiance on the Syrian Frontier". Philostratus's Heroikos: Religion and Cultural Identity in the Third Century C.E. Leiden-Boston: Brill. pp. 317–332. ISBN 9004130942.
- Griffith, Sidney H. (2005). "Answering the Call of the Minaret: Christian Apologetics in the World of Islam". Redefining Christian Identity: Cultural Interaction in the Middle East Since the Rise of Islam. Leuven: Peeters Publishers. pp. 91–126. ISBN 9789042914186.
- Griffith, Sidney H. (2006). "St. Ephraem, Bar Daysān and the Clash of Madrāshê in Aram: Readings in St. Ephraem's Hymni contra Haereses". The Harp: A Review of Syriac and Oriental Studies. 21: 447–472. doi:10.31826/9781463233105-026.
- Griffith, Sidney H. (2007). "Christian Lore and the Arabic Qur'ān: The Companions of the Cave in Sūrat al-Kahf and in Syriac Christian Tradition". The Qur'ān in its Historical Context. London-New York: Routledge. pp. 109–137. ISBN 9781134109456.
- Griffith, Sidney H. (2008). The Church in the Shadow of the Mosque: Christians and Muslims in the World of Islam. Princeton: Princeton University Press. ISBN 978-0691130156.
- Griffith, Sidney H. (2007). "Syrian Christian Intellectuals in the World of Islam: Faith, the Philosophical Life, and the Quest for an Interreligious Convivencia in Abbasid Times" (PDF). Journal of the Canadian Society for Syriac Studies. 7: 55–73. doi:10.31826/jcsss-2009-070106. S2CID 212689096.
- Griffith, Sidney H. (2008). "John of Damascus and the Church in Syria in the Umayyad Era: The Intellectual and Cultural Milieu of Orthodox Christians in the World of Islam" (PDF). Hugoye: Journal of Syriac Studies. 11 (2): 207–237. doi:10.31826/hug-2011-110111. S2CID 212688109.
- Griffith, Sidney H. (2010). "The Syriac-Speaking Churches and the Muslims in the Medinan era of Muḥammmad and the Four Caliphs". Syriac Churches Encountering Islam: Past Experiences and Future Perspectives. Piscataway, NJ: Gorgias Press. pp. 14–46. ISBN 9781611430011.
- Griffith, Sidney H. (2013). The Bible in Arabic: The Scriptures of the People of the Book in the Language of Islam. Princeton: Princeton University Press. ISBN 978-1400846580.
- Griffith, Sidney H. (2014). "The Unity and Trinity of God: Christian Doctrinal Development in Response to the Challenge of Islam - An Historical Perspective". Christian Theology and Islam. Eugene: Cascade Books. pp. 1–30. ISBN 9781610978149.
- Griffith, Sidney H. (2015). "What Does Mecca Have to Do with Urhōy? Syriac Christianity, Islamic Origins, and the Qurān". Syriac Encounters: Papers from the Sixth North American Syriac Symposium. Leuven: Peeters Publishers. pp. 369–400. ISBN 9789042930469.
- Griffith, Sidney H. (2016). "Christian Theological Thought during the First Abbāsid Century". The Oxford Handbook of Islamic Theology. Oxford: Oxford University Press. pp. 91–102. ISBN 978-0-19-969670-3.
- Griffith, Sidney H. (2016). "Syriac into Arabic: A New Chapter in the History of Syriac Christianity". Journal of the Canadian Society for Syriac Studies. 26: 3–28. doi:10.31826/jcsss-2016-160103. S2CID 212688865.
- Griffith, Sidney H. (2018). "Christianity's Historic Roots in the Middle East: Christians at Home in the World of Islam". Secular Nationalism and Citizenship in Muslim Countries: Arab Christians in the Levant. Cham: Palgrave Macmillan. pp. 29–60. ISBN 9783319712048.
- Griffith, Sidney H. (2018). "The Qur'an in Christian Arabic Literature: A Cursory Overview". Arab Christians and the Qur'an from the Origins of Islam to the Medieval Period. Leiden-Boston: Brill. pp. 1–19. ISBN 9789004360747.
- Griffith, Sidney H. (2020). "Denominationalism in Fourth-Century Syria: Readings in Saint Ephraem's Hymns against Heresies, Madrāshê 22–24". The Garb of Being: Embodiment and the Pursuit of Holiness in Late Ancient Christianity. New York: Fordham University Press. pp. 79–100. ISBN 9780823287024.

== External links and further reading ==
- Bibliography at the Catholic University of America
- Griffith, Sidney H., The Bible in Arabic: The Scriptures of the 'People of the Book' in the Language of Islam ISBN 9780691150826
