= Gregory of Kashkar =

Gregory of Kashkar (died c. 611) was the bishop of Kashkar and then from about 596 the metropolitan of Nisibis in the Church of the East. His hagiography treats him as a pivotal figure in the preservation of the church's distinctive theology.

A biography of Gregory, conventionally known as the Life of Gregory, is incorporated into the 10th-century Arabic Chronicle of Seert, which cites the authority of Theodore bar Koni and Elias of Merv. The Life is probably itself an abbreviated translation of a lost Syriac hagiography probably composed in the 660s. Elias of Merv may be the author of the Khuzistan Chronicle, which aligns with the Chronicle of Seert regarding Gregory's life. Babai the Great also wrote a now lost hagiography of Gregory not long after his death. He presents him as an associate of the Zoroastrian convert George of Izla and as a martyr because he died in exile.

Gregory was born in Kashkar and spent his entire life in the Sasanian Empire. He received an early education in the Psalms, before moving on to the school of Seleucia-Ctesiphon and later the school of Nisibis, where he studied under Abraham of Beth Rabban. He founded a school in Arbela at the request of the people of Adiabene, according to the Chronicle of Seert. In his Book of Chastity, Ishoʿdnaḥ describes Gregory at this time as "a teacher and an interpreter". From Arbela he went on to found a school in Kashkar, which attracted 300 students, and then another in a nearby village. For his students, he prescribed a regimen of fasting and prayer. According to the Life, he preached the gospel in Maishan and with his prayers protected Kashkar from the plague. His hagiography stresses his high reputation even among the Zoroastrians. The chief magi of the district are said to have gone to his school to beg him for his prayers during the plague. On account of his reputation for holiness, Patriarch Ishoʿyahb I appointed him bishop of Kashkar.

Gregory was promoted to the metropolitanate of Nisibis around 596. He came into conflict with the director of the school, Henana of Adiabene, whose works he condemned as contrary to the exegesis of Theodore of Mopsuestia. According to the Life, he was also the first to publicly denounce Gabriel of Sinjar. Receiving no support from the Patriarch Sabrishoʿ I, Gregory left Nisibis in voluntary exile. He reportedly had with him some 300 followers, while a much smaller party remained with Henana. Among his followers known by name were Ishoʿyahb of Gdala, Ishoʿyahb of Adiabene and Barḥadbshabba ʿArbaya.

For his exile, Gregory and his followers gave away their wealth, keeping only those things that were necessary for the performance of the liturgy. According to the Life, King Khusrau II ordered the exiles into the desert of Niffar. According to the Khuzistan Chronicle, Khusrau had been informed that Gregory was unpopular. The historian Philip Wood agrees that Gregory "experienced a dramatic loss of face" at this time, and regards the hagiographic tradition as mispresenting the popularity of Henana, Sabrishoʿ and what was probably a more moderate faction.

Gregory spent the rest of his life in the desert converting the locals to Christianity. He died around 611.

== Sources ==
- Becker, Adam H. (2006). Fear of God and the Beginning of Wisdom: The School of Nisibis and the Development of Scholastic Culture in Late Antique Mesopotamia. University of Pennsylvania Press.
- Wood, Philip (2013). The Chronicle of Seert: Christian Historical Imagination in Late Antique Iraq. Oxford University Press.
