= ʿeltā =

In Syriac literature, an ʿeltā (plural ʿellātā) is a work explaining the reasons behind feast days, aspects of the liturgy or some other part of church tradition. It is a distinctive literary genre of the Church of the East and is strongly associated with the schools, such as the School of Nisibis and the School of Seleucia-Ctesiphon. It flourished between the 6th and 8th centuries.

The word ʿeltā is Syriac for "cause" or "explanation". The genre may be called "cause literature" in English.

== Works ==
Most surviving examples of the genre are derived from a single 16th-century manuscript collection called "Explanations of the Feasts of the Economy". All of these date to the 6th century:

- Cyrus of Edessa
  - On the Fast
  - On the Pascha
  - On the Passion
  - On the Resurrection
  - On the Ascension
  - On Pentecost
- Thomas of Edessa
  - On the Birth of Christ
  - On the Epiphany
- Ishai
  - On the Feast of the Martyrs
- Henana of Adiabene
  - On Good Friday
  - On the Rogation
- Posi
  - On the Fast
- Anonymous
  - On the Commemoration of Mary

Outside of this collection are the ʿeltā on the Trisagion by the 6th-century Patriarch Ishoyahb I and the Cause of the Foundation of the Schools by a certain Barhadbshabba, either Barhadbshabba of Hulwan or Barhadbshabba Arbaya.

Many ʿellātā were written that no longer survive. They are known only through the bibliography compiled in the early 14th century by Abdisho bar Brikha. These include:

- Henana of Adiabene
  - On the Friday of Gold
  - On the Discovery [of the Cross]
- Babai the Great
  - On Palm Sunday
  - On the Feast of the Cross
  - Book of Causes on Matthew the Wavering, Abraham of Nisibis and Gabriel Qatraya
- Joseph Hazzaya
  - On the Glorious Festival
- Abraham of Mahoze
  - On All the Festivals
- Cyriacus of Nisibis
  - On the Birth of Christ
  - On the Epiphany
- Gregory of Shushtre
  - On the Festivals

Abdisho also records that Shallita of Reshaina in the 8th century, the Patriarch Isho bar Nun in the 9th and the Patriarch Abdisho I in the 10th wrote ʿellātā, without specifying on what topics.

== Bibliography ==
- Baumstark, Anton (1901). "Die nestorianischen Schriften 'de causis festorum'". Oriens Christianus. 1: 320–342.
- Becker, Adam H. (2013). Fear of God and the Beginning of Wisdom: The School of Nisibis and the Development of Scholastic Culture in Late Antique Mesopotamia. University of Pennsylvania Press.
- Macomber, William Francis (1964). "The Theological Synthesis of Cyrus of Edessa, an East Syrian Theologian of the Mid Sixth Century". Orientalia Christiana Periodica. 30: 5–38.
- Macomber, William Francis, ed. (1974). Six Explanations of the Liturgical Feasts by Cyrus of Edessa, an East Syrian Theologian of the Mid Sixth Century. Corpus Scriptorum Christianorum Orientalium.
- Possekel, Ute (2020). "Transmitting Theodore to the Church of the East: The Contribution of Thomas of Edessa". The Journal of Ecclesiastical History. 71 (4): 712–737. doi:10.1017/S0022046920000706. S2CID 229010574.
- Reinink, G. J. (2008). "The Cause of the Commemoration of Mary: Author, Date, and Christology". In George A. Kiraz (ed.). Malphono w-Rabo d-Malphone: Studies in Honor of Sebastian P. Brock. Gorgias Press. pp. 517–534.
- Riad, Eva (1988). Studies in the Syriac Preface. Almqvist and Wiksell.
