= Elias of Merv =

Elias (or Elijah, Syriac: ܐܠܝܐ, Eliya; died after 659) was the metropolitan bishop of Merv in the Church of the East.

The Chronicle of Khuzestan records how Elias converted some Turks and their "kinglet" (MLKWNʾ) through preaching and miracles. He is said to have dispersed with the sign of the cross a storm conjured up by the kinglet's shamans, thus proving the superiority of Christianity. Since the chronicle does not mention any event later than 652, the conversion of the Turks probably took place before this date. Elias was present at the deathbed of the Patriarch Ishoʿyahb III in 659. He probably died not long after.

Elias wrote a short church history, described by ʿAbdishoʿ bar Brikha around 1300 as comprising a single book. The 10th-century Chronicle of Seert cites it as a source twice, especially for the life of Gregory of Nisibis. Elias's high standing in the church would have given him access to official records and possibly also to court gossip. Pierre Nautin argued that this history was in fact the Chronicle of Khuzestan, with additions made by an associate after Elias's death, including the account of the conversion of the Turks. The beginning of the Chronicle of Khuzestan is lost.

According to ʿAbdishoʿ, Elias also wrote antiphons, consolations, a commentary on the gospel readings and an account of the origins (ʿeltā) of the responsive prayers at nocturns. Besides these liturgical writings, he wrote commentaries on the biblical books of Proverbs, Genesis, Psalms, Ecclesiastes, Song of Songs, Isaiah, Sirach, the Twelve Minor Prophets and the Pauline epistles. Several of his letters were also known to ʿAbdishoʿ.

== Sources ==
- Badger, G. P., ed. (1852). The Nestorians and Their Rituals. Vol. 2. Joseph Masters. ISBN 978-0-7905-4482-3.
- Hoyland, Robert G. (1997). Seeing Islam As Others Saw It: A Survey and Evaluation of Christian, Jewish and Zoroastrian Writings on Early Islam. Darwin Press.
- Hunter, Erica C. D. (1989). "The Conversion of the Kerait to Christianity in A.D. 1009". Zentralasiatische Studien. 22: 142–163.
- Nautin, Pierre (1982). "L'auteur de la "Chronique anonyme de Guidi": Élie de Merw". Revue de l'histoire des religions. 199 (3): 303–314. doi:10.3406/rhr.1982.4673. JSTOR 23670021.
- Wood, Philip (2013). The Chronicle of Seert: Christian Historical Imagination in Late Antique Iraq. Oxford University Press.
