= Cyrus of Edessa =

6th-century Syriac Christian writer

Cyrus of Edessa (or Qiyore of Edessa) was a Syriac writer and teacher in the Church of the East. He was probably a native of Edessa. He studied at the school of Nisibis (c. 533–538) under Aba, the future patriarch, and then taught at the school of Seleucia-Ctesiphon, eventually rising to become its headmaster. He founded a monastery at Ḥirta sometime after the death of Aba (552).

Cyrus was one of the earliest Syriac authors to write liturgical commentary of the "cause" or explanation (ʿeltā) genre. He wrote six treatises explaining important events of the liturgical year, namely the Great Fast, Maundy Thursday (Pascha), Good Friday (Feast of the Passion), Easter (Feast of the Resurrection), the Feast of the Ascension and the Feast of Pentecost. His work completed that begun by Thomas of Edessa on the feasts of Nativity and Epiphany. Like Thomas, he was influenced by the theology of Theodore of Mopsuestia.

In his explanation of the Fast, Cyrus writes that "[fasting] appears with the Manichaeans, the Marcionites, Macedonians, Valentinians, and Katharoi (qtrw), together with all of the Mandaeans, the Kentaeans, and those like them." He also criticizes "the heretics, the Manichaeans, ... the Marcionites, the Bardesanites, and so on."

== Editions ==
- ed. in W. F. Macomber, Six Explanations of the Liturgical Feasts, Corpus Scriptorum Christianorum Orientalium, vols. 355–356 (1974).

== Bibliography ==
- Brock, Sebastian P. (2018) [2011]. "Qiyore of Edessa". In Sebastian P. Brock; Aaron M. Butts; George A. Kiraz; Lucas Van Rompay (eds.). Gorgias Encyclopedic Dictionary of the Syriac Heritage: Electronic Edition. Beth Mardutho, print Gorgias Press.
- Possekel, Ute (2018). "Cyrus of Edessa". In Oliver Nicholson (ed.). The Oxford Dictionary of Late Antiquity. Vol. 1. Oxford University Press. p. 447.
- van Bladel, Kevin (2017). From Sasanian Mandaeans to Ṣābians of the Marshes. Leiden: Brill. doi:10.1163/9789004339460. ISBN 978-90-04-33943-9.
