= Daniel bar Maryam =

Daniel bar Maryam (or Mariam) was a historian and chronographer of the Church of the East who lived in the 7th century.

Daniel is known to have been a contemporary of the Patriarch Ishoʿyahb III (r. 649–659). He may be the same person as Daniel bar Ṭubanitha.

Daniel wrote a four-volume Ecclesiastical History in Syriac that does not survive, but is mentioned by the Patriarch Timothy I, Pseudo-George of Arbela and Ishoʿdad of Merv. It is cited or quoted five times in the Arabic Chronicle of Siirt, but whether it was used directly may be doubted. It is one of three lost 7th-century histories that the anonymous author of the Chronicle appears to have had access to, along with those of Elias of Merv and Bar Sahde. According to Daniel, as cited by the Chronicle, the Patriarch Ahha wrote the biography of his master, the Life of ʿAbda of Deir Qoni, during his patriarchate. He is also cited in a passage on Demetrianus of Antioch. Philip Wood, however, doubts that Daniel is the main source for these passages. Daniel is quoted on the successors of Demetrianus: a certain Azdaq in Gundeshapur and Paul of Samosata at Antioch.

According to ʿAbdishoʿ bar Brikha's list of Syriac authors, composed in the 14th century, Daniel also wrote an exposition of the Chronicon of Eusebius.

== Bibliography ==
- Brock, Sebastian P. (1976). "Syriac Sources for Seventh-Century History". Byzantine and Modern Greek Studies. 2 (1): 17–36. doi:10.1179/030701376790206207. S2CID 162305771.
- Degen, Erika (1968). "Daniel bar Maryam: Ein nestorianischer Kirchenhistoriker". Oriens Christianus. 52: 45–80.
- Degen, Erika (1969). "Die Kirchengeschichte des Daniel bar Maryam — eine Quelle der Chronik von Seʿert?". In Wolfgang Voigt (ed.). XVII. Deutscher Orientalistentag vom 21. bis 27. Juli 1968 in Würzburg: Vorträge. Teil 2. Franz Steiner. pp. 511–516.
- Hoyland, Robert G. (1997). Seeing Islam as Others Saw It: A Survey and Evaluation of Christian, Jewish and Zoroastrian Writings on Early Islam. Darwin Press.
- Van Rompay, Lucas (2018) [2011]. "Daniel bar Maryam". In Sebastian P. Brock; Aaron M. Butts; George A. Kiraz; Lucas Van Rompay (eds.). Gorgias Encyclopedic Dictionary of the Syriac Heritage: Electronic Edition. Gorgias Press [online ed. Beth Mardutho].
- Wood, Philip (2013). The Chronicle of Seert: Christian Historical Imagination in Late Antique Iraq. Oxford University Press.
- Wright, William (1894). A Short History of Syriac Literature (PDF). Adam and Charles Black. Archived from the original (PDF) on 2020-10-26.
