= Cause of All Causes =

Anonymous Syriac encyclopedia

The Cause of All Causes, also called the Book of the Acknowledgement of Truth, is an anonymous Syriac encyclopedia written sometime between the 10th and 12th centuries.

== Date and authorship ==
The author was an anonymous Syriac Orthodox bishop of Edessa. He claims to have served as bishop for thirty years, after which he was exiled and recalled before finally retiring to a monastery. He has not been definitively identified. The 19th-century scholar Anton Pohlmann suggested Jacob of Edessa (died 708), but more recent opinion favours a later date. Carl Anton Baumstark argued for a date no earlier than the 10th century on the basis of Tendenz, while Theodor Nöldeke argued that the text showed the influence of Arabic and should date to the 11th or 12th century. There was a bishop named Athanasius who served for thirty years in the 11th century.

== Synopsis ==
The Cause of All Causes originally contained nine sections (memrē, discourses). Each section has between five and ten chapters. Today only the first six sections and the first two chapters of the seventh survive. It is more likely that the work "was once transmitted in two volumes and that the second volume has disappeared, or that some scribe, in an early stage of the transmission of the text, did not complete his copying-work" than that it was unfinished.

Its purpose is to bring the reader to a full knowledge of God, identified as the cause of all causes, through the interpretation of nature and scripture. The first step the reader should take is to find solitude and quietude, preferably in a monastery. The acquisition of knowledge then proceeds through three stages or levels. First, one reads the "book of nature", which is accessible to all and prior to books written by humans. Nature relates to man as macrocosm to microcosm. The "technical explanations of the wonders of creation" make it "an encyclopaedia of natural science". From there one proceeds to human writings, preferring first the Torah, the written law. Finally, one reads the Gospels, the spiritual law.

It is addressed to for a universal readership, although in practice this limited to members of the Abrahamic faiths (Christians, Jews and Muslims). For this reason it emphasises the "Book of Moses" (i.e., the Torah), a scripture accepted by all. It does, however, contain allusions to the Qurʾān. In certain respects, such as its arguments for Trinitarianism from nature, the Cause of All Causes reads as an attempt "to show the superiority of the religion of the Christians". The three levels of knowledge correspond to humanity (nature), the Abrahamic faithful (Torah) and Christians (gospel). The work is thus "a demonstration that Christianity is the 'universal religion,' since only this religion embraces the three levels of knowledge leading to the perfect knowledge of God."

== Manuscripts and editions ==
There are at least thirteen manuscripts of the Syriac text. It was most popular in the Church of the East. There is an Arabic translation known from a Garshuni manuscript.

Karl Kayser published an edition of the Syriac text under the title Das Buch von der Erkenntniss der Wahrheit oder der Ursache aller Ursachen in 1889 with a German translation under the same title following in 1893. Giuseppe Furlani published some Syriac extracts in the Rivista degli Studi Orientali in 1948.

== See also ==
- The Cause of the Foundation of Schools by Barhadbeshabba

== Bibliography ==
- Baumstark, Anton (1922). Geschichte der syrischen Literatur, mit Ausschluss der christlich-palästinensischen Texte. Bonn.
- McCollum, Adam C. (2012). "A Syriac Fragment from The Cause of All Causes on the Pillars of Hercules". ISAW Papers (5).
- Mengozzi, Alessandro (2011). "Cause of Causes". In Sebastian P. Brock; Aaron M. Butts; George A. Kiraz; Lucas Van Rompay (eds.). Gorgias Encyclopedic Dictionary of the Syriac Heritage: Electronic Edition. Gorgias Press. [Published online by Beth Mardutho in 2018.]
- Reinink, G. J. (2011). "Communal Identity and the Systematisation of Knowledge in the Syriac Cause of All Causes". In Averil Cameron; Robert Hoyland (eds.). Doctrine and Debate in the East Christian World, 300–1500. Routledge. pp. 379–392 (275–288). doi:10.4324/9781315257495. [Originally published in Peter Binkley (ed.), Pre-Modern Encyclopaedic Texts: Proceedings of the Second COMERS Congress, Groningen, 1–4 July 1996, Brill's Studies in Intellectual History 79 (Brill, 1997), pp. 275–288. doi:10.1163/9789004247338_005]
- Rundgren, Frithiof (1987–1988). "Some Remarks on the Kətābā də-'al ida'tā da-šrārā" (PDF). Orientalia Suecana. 36–37: 77–84.
- Teule, Herman G. B. (2011). "Ktābā d-ʿal-idaʿtā da-shrārā". In David Thomas; Alex Mallett; Juan Pedro Monferrer Sala; Johannes Pahlitzsch; Mark Swanson; Herman Teule; John Tolan (eds.). Christian–Muslim Relations: A Bibliographical History. Vol. 3 (1050–1200). Leiden: Brill. pp. 261–263.
