= Thomas of Edessa =

Theologican of the Church of the East who wrote several works in Syriac

Thomas of Edessa (or Tōmā ūrhāyā; died c. 540) was a theologian of the Church of the East who wrote several works in Syriac, most of them lost.

Thomas was educated in Edessa. There he taught Greek to the future patriarch, Aba. He later travelled with Aba around the Roman Empire, including to its capital, Constantinople. He studied under Aba at the school of Nisibis in the Persian Empire. He also taught at Nisibis. He may have died in Constantinople or on his return journey to Nisibis.

Thomas was influenced by the theology of Theodore of Mopsuestia. He wrote several works, but only two survive and only one of these has been printed. ʿAbdishoʿ bar Brikha ascribes to him some buyyāye (hortatory discourses), a refutation of astrology, some treatises against heresy in the form of disputations and an epistolary treatise on qāle, that is, stanzaic syllabic chants. His commentaries on the feasts of Nativity and Epiphany are the oldest extant examples in the genre of ʿeltā (cause, explanation, etiology). Only his explanation of the Nativity has been printed. Cyrus of Edessa continued the work of Thomas by writing etiologies for the spring festivals.

== Editions ==
- Carr, Simon Joseph, ed. (1898). Thomae Edesseni Tractatus de nativitate Domini Nostri Christi: textum syriacum. Rome: Accademia dei Lincei.
  Reprinted as Thomas of Edessa on the Nativity of the Lord. the Syriac Studies Library, 79. Gorgias Press, 2012.

== Bibliography ==
- Becker, Adam H. (2018) [2011]. "Toma of Edessa". In Sebastian P. Brock; Aaron M. Butts; George A. Kiraz; Lucas Van Rompay (eds.). Gorgias Encyclopedic Dictionary of the Syriac Heritage: Electronic Edition. Beth Mardutho, print Gorgias Press.
- Hainthaler, Theresia (2006). "Thomas of Edessa, Causa de Nativitate: Some Considerations" (PDF). Parole de l'Orient. 31: 63–85.
- McCrindle, J. W., ed. (1897). The Christian Topography of Cosmas, an Egyptian Monk: Translated from the Greek, and Edited with Notes and Introduction. Cambridge University Press.
- Possekel, Ute (2018). "Cyrus of Edessa". In Nicholson, Oliver (ed.). The Oxford Dictionary of Late Antiquity, Volume 1: A–I. Oxford: Oxford University Press. p. 447. ISBN 978-0-19-881624-9.
- Possekel, Ute (2018). "Thomas of Edessa". In Nicholson, Oliver (ed.). The Oxford Dictionary of Late Antiquity, Volume 2: J–Z. Oxford: Oxford University Press. p. 1497. ISBN 978-0-19-881625-6.
- Possekel, Ute (2020). "Transmitting Theodore to the Church of the East: The Contribution of Thomas of Edessa". The Journal of Ecclesiastical History. 71 (4): 712–737. doi:10.1017/S0022046920000706. S2CID 229010574.
- Van Rompay, Lucas (2018) [2011]. "Aba I". In Sebastian P. Brock; Aaron M. Butts; George A. Kiraz; Lucas Van Rompay (eds.). Gorgias Encyclopedic Dictionary of the Syriac Heritage: Electronic Edition. Beth Mardutho, print Gorgias Press.
