= Aba I =

Patriarch of the Church of the East from 540 to 552

Mar Abba the Great
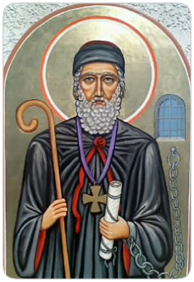
- Mar Abba the Great; Patriarch of Seleucia-Ctesiphon

Catholicos Patriarch
- Born: Hala, Asorestan, Sasanid Iran
- Died: 552; Adurbadagan, Sasanid Iran
- Venerated in: Assyrian Church of the East; Ancient Church of the East; Chaldean Catholic Church; Syro-Malabar Catholic Church
- Major shrine: Seminary of Mar Abba the Great, El Cajon, California, United States

Aba I (or, with his Syriac honorific, Mar Aba I) or Mar Abba the Great was the Patriarch of the Church of the East at Seleucia-Ctesiphon from 540 to 552. He introduced to the church the anaphoras of Theodore of Mopsuestia and Nestorius beside the more ancient liturgical rite of Addai and Mari. Though his tenure as catholicos saw Christians in the region threatened during the Perso-Roman wars and attempts by both Sassanid Persian and Byzantine rulers to interfere with the governance of the church, his reign is reckoned a period of consolidation, and a synod he held in 544 as (despite excluding the Diocese of Merv) instrumental in unifying and strengthening the church. In 544, the Synod of Mar Aba I adopted the ordinances of the Council of Chalcedon. He is thought to have written and translated a number of religious works. After his death in February 552, the faithful carried his casket from his simple home across the Tigris to the monastery of Mar Pithyon.

Aba is a highly regarded and significantly venerated saint in the Assyrian Church of the East, the Ancient Church of the East, and the Chaldean Catholic Church. He is documented in the Ausgewählte Akten Persischer Märtyrer, and The Lesser Eastern Churches, two biographies of Eastern saints. The first seminary of the Chaldean Catholic Church outside of Iraq was established in July 2008 in El Cajon, San Diego, as the Seminary of Mar Abba the Great.

== Early life ==
Born into a Zoroastrian family of Persian origin in Hala, Mesopotamia, Mar Aba was secretary to the governor of Beth Garmai province before he converted to Christianity. He was baptised in Ḥīrtā and studied at the School of Nisibis. He then went to Edessa in the Roman Empire, where he learned Greek from Thomas, who became his travelling companion. He traveled widely in the Roman Empire, visiting the Holy Land, Constantinople and Egypt. He was in Constantinople sometime between 525 and 533. Because he favoured the Biblical interpretation and commentaries of Theodore of Mopsuestia, the Byzantine emperor Justinian I attempted to meet with him to persuade him to denounce Theodore's teachings. Justinian was preparing to anathematize Theodore and his works. In Alexandria, one of his pupils was the merchant and writer known as "Cosmas Indicopleustes". In his Christian Topography, written between 548 and 550, Cosmas credits Aba with teaching him everything he knows. He says that in Greek Aba went by the name Patrikios.

Upon returning to Persia, Aba became a mpaššqānā or teacher of biblical exegesis at the School of Nisibis. One of his pupils there was Cyrus of Edessa. He later taught in Seleucia-Ctesiphon, the school of which he is said to have founded. Highly regarded as a scholar, he is credited with the translation (or with having overseen the translation) of key texts, including the works of Theodore and Nestorius, from Greek into Syriac. The translator of Nestorius' Book of Heraclides dedicated his work to Aba. Aba is also remembered as the author of original works including Biblical commentaries, homilies and synodal letters. These survive today only in quotations in other works, notably those of Ishodad of Merv. A remark in the Chronicle of Seert may suggest that Aba made a translation of the Old Testament into Syriac, but there is no other evidence of this.

== Patriarch ==
=== 544 Synod ===
Aba's tenure as catholicos followed a 15-year period of schism within the church, during which remote areas had elected their own rival bishops. Aba was able to resolve this schism, visiting the disputed areas and negotiating agreements to reunite the church. In 544, he convened a synod to ratify these agreements; the synod agreed that the metropolitans of those regions under the See of Seleucia-Ctesiphon would, in the future, elect catholicoi at formal meetings. This agreement was, however, substantially subverted in later years, not least when the Persian ruler Khosrau I influenced the selection of Joseph, Aba's successor as catholicos.

The acts of the synod also documented an "orthodoxy of faith", written by Aba himself. Some of its prescriptions indicate the particularly Persian character of the church in the East, including a set of marriage rules prohibiting unions between close kin, apparently formulated in deliberate response to Zoroastrian practice.

In 549, Aba established a diocese for the Hephthalite Huns.

=== Tensions between the Empires ===
Tensions between the Persian and Byzantine empires ran high during Mar Aba's lifetime, and, after the outbreak of the Lazic War in 541, persecution of Christians in Persia became more common. Zoroastrians hostile to Aba as an apostate pressured Khosrau to act against him, and, as punishment for proselytizing among the Zoroastrians, Aba was placed under house arrest and eventually exiled to Adurbadagan (Azerbaijan). He was allowed to return to the See after seven years and continued as Catholicos until 552, when he died – in some accounts, as a result of torture and exposure inflicted during his imprisonment.

== Sources ==
- Chabot, Jean-Baptiste (1902). Synodicon orientale ou recueil de synodes nestoriens (PDF). Paris: Imprimerie Nationale.
- Holweck, F. G., A Biographical Dictionary of the Saints. St. Louis, MO: B. Herder, 1924.
- Greatrex, Geoffrey; Lieu, Samuel N. C. (2002). The Roman Eastern Frontier and the Persian Wars (Part II, 363–630 AD). New York, New York and London, United Kingdom: Routledge (Taylor & Francis). ISBN 0-415-14687-9.
- Meyendorff, John (1989). Imperial unity and Christian divisions: The Church 450-680 A.D. Crestwood, NY: St. Vladimir's Seminary Press. ISBN 978-0-88-141056-3.
- Life of Mar Aba

Church of the East titles
Preceded by Paul (539)	Catholicos-Patriarch of the East (540–552)	Succeeded by Joseph (552–567)
