= School of Seleucia-Ctesiphon =

Theological school of the church

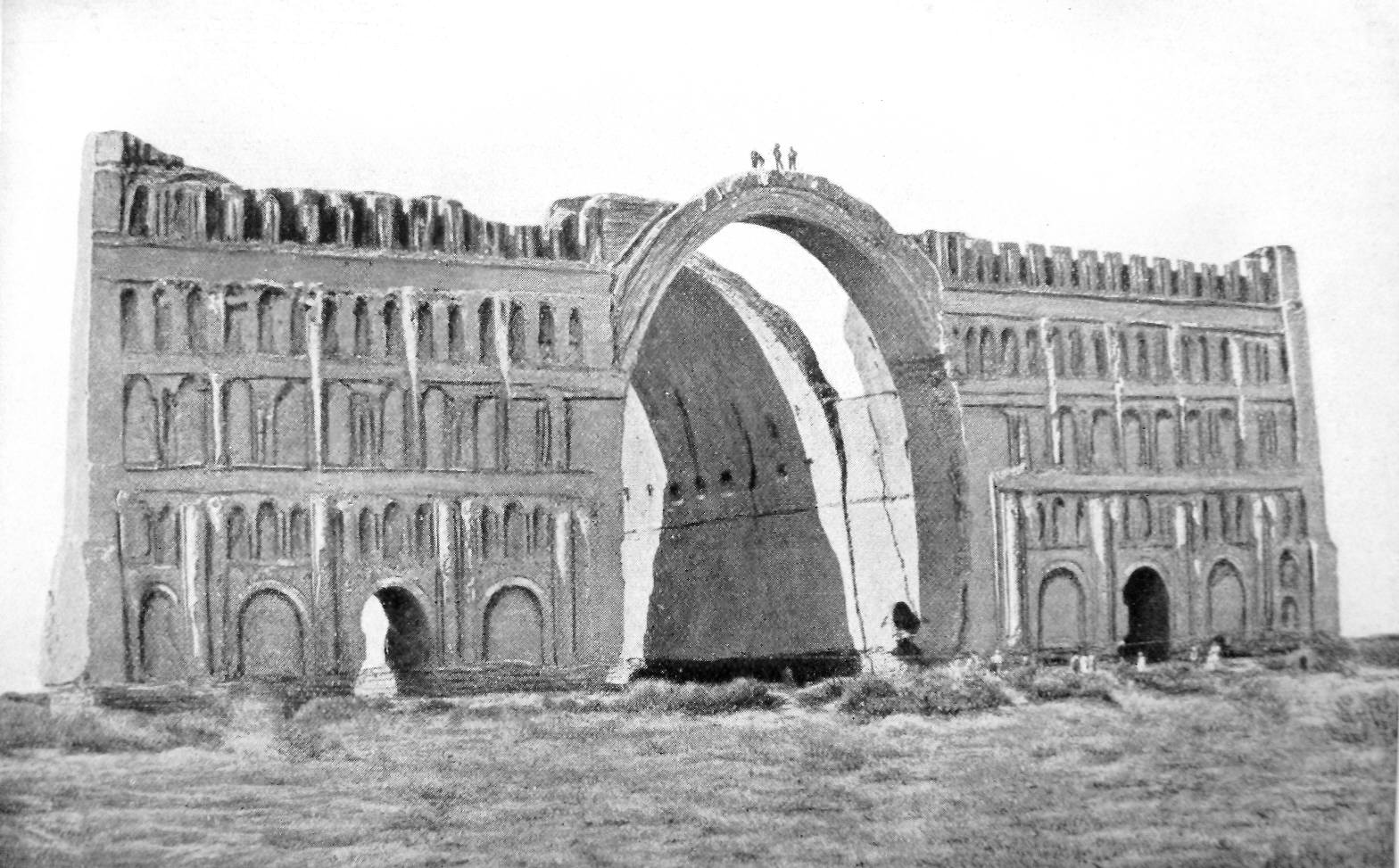
Standing arch at Ctesiphon

The School of Seleucia-Ctesiphon (sometimes School of Seleucia) was a theological school of the Church of the East located in the western half of the city of Seleucia-Ctesiphon on the right bank of the Tigris. It was an independent Christian school, not attached to any particular church or monastery.

The origins of the school are unclear. The Patriarch Acacius (485–495/6) taught in Seleucia-Ctesiphon after leaving the School of Edessa and this has been taken as evidence for the school existing in the late 5th century. According to the foundation legend found in the Chronicle of Siirt, the Patriarch Aba I (540–552) defeated a Zoroastrian adversary in a debate and founded the school at that very spot. This, however, is not mentioned in Aba's earlier and more reliable biography. A fragment of Barḥadbshabba's On the Cause of the Foundation of the Schools also ascribes the founding of the school to Aba I. The historian Jean Maurice Fiey concluded that the school of Acacius was re-founded under Aba. The Chronicle of Siirt states that it was restored and rebuilt under the Patriarch Ezekiel (567–581). It was certainly in existence by that time. Its early prestige can be judged by the fact that its headmaster or director, Ishai at the time, took part in the selection of a new patriarch.

Between 596 and 602, the Roman emperor Maurice sent Maruta, bishop of Chalcedon, as ambassador to the Sasanian king Khosrau II. The ambassador listened to lectures at the school, gave gifts to the students and was received directions for his return journey from the headmaster, Bokhtisho. The school appears to have been at the centre of the Christian community in the Sasanian capital if it could host a visiting Roman dignitary.

There was some exchange of personnel and texts between the School of Seleucia and the older School of Nisibis. According to the Chronicle of Siirt, Aba studied at Nisibis before founding the school in Seleucia. Gregory of Kashkar, who became archbishop of Nisibis (c.596) after studying there, originally studied the Psalms at Seleucia. The Patriarch Ishoyahb III (649–659) studied at Nisibis and tried to move part of the School of Seleucia to the Monastery of Beth Abe, probably to protect it after the fall of the Sasanian Empire to the Arabs.

In the late 7th and early 8th century, Gabriel Arya of Beth Qatraye taught at Seleucia. Among his students were the future patriarchs Hnanisho I (686–700) and Aba II (742–753). Gabriel is known to have written biblical commentaries and Aba II works of philosophy. The latter had a dispute with his clergy over the running of the school.

== Famous teachers and alumni ==
- Patriarch Aba II, alumnus
- Patriarch Acacius, possible teacher late 5th century
- Cyrus of Edessa, director mid-6th century
- Bokhtisho, director c. 600
- Gabriel Arya, teacher late 7th century
- Gregory of Kashkar, alumnus
- Patriarch Gregory, teacher of biblical interpretation c. 605
- Patriarch Hnanisho I, alumnus
- Ishai, director late 6th century
- Ramisho the Interpreter, teacher late 6th century
- Titus of Hdatta, alumnus

== Bibliography ==
- Becker, Adam H. (2006). Fear of God and the Beginning of Wisdom: The School of Nisibis and the Development of Scholastic Culture in Late Antique Mesopotamia. University of Pennsylvania Press.
- Becker, Adam H., ed. (2008). Sources for the History of the School of Nisibis. Liverpool University Press.
- Fiey, Jean Maurice (1967). "Topographie chrétienne de Mahozé". L'Orient Syrien. 12: 397–420.
- Reinink, Gerrit J. (2013). "The School of Seleucia and the Heritage of Nisibis, the 'Mother of Sciences'". In Carla Nocela; Massimo Pampaloni; Claudia Tavolieri (eds.). Le vie del sapere in ambito siro-mesopotamico dal III al IX secolo: Atti del convegno internazionale tenuto a Roma nei giorni 12–13 maggio 2011. Pontificio Istituto Orientale. pp. 115–132.
- Van Rompay, Lucas (2011). "Grigor I". In Sebastian P. Brock; Aaron M. Butts; George A. Kiraz; Lucas Van Rompay (eds.). Gorgias Encyclopedic Dictionary of the Syriac Heritage: Electronic Edition. Gorgias Press.
