= Cause of causes =

Cause of causes or Cause of Causes may refer to:

- Cause of (all) causes, the first cause or unmoved mover
- Cause of Causes (horse)
- Cause of All Causes, Syriac encyclopedia
