= Richard Connolly =

Richard Connolly may refer to:

- Richard Connolly (composer) (1927–2022), Australian musician, composer and former broadcaster for the Australian Broadcasting Corporation
- Richard Connolly (monk) (1873–1948), monk of Downside Abbey, England
- Richard B. Connolly (1810–1880), American politician from New York

== See also ==
- Richard L. Conolly (1892–1962), United States Navy admiral
