= Keilschrifttexte aus Assur religiösen Inhalts =

Keilschrifttexte aus Assur religiösen Inhalts, often abbreviated as KAR, is a two-volume German publication by the Assyriologist Erich Ebeling from 1919 to 1923. The work offers a critical edition of several hundred cuneiform tablets discovered during 1903–1914 German excavations directed by Walter Andrae and Julius Jordan in the former Assyrian capital city Assur, dating to the reign of Ashurbanipal (7th century BC). The compiled inscriptions also form one of the main primary sources for the tablets used in reconstructing the famous creation epic, the Enuma Elish. Inscriptions in KAR are itemized according to the order of their appearance in the work. Therefore, the 34th tablet is numbered as KAR 34. Volume 1 contains inscriptions KAR 1–175, and Volume 2 contains inscriptions KAR 176–472.

A number of inscriptions from KAR have been digitized and more information about them can now be found on databases including the Cuneiform Digital Library Initiative and Oracc (Open Richly Annotated Cuneiform Corpus).

== Important inscriptions ==
Several inscriptions in KAR have aided the understanding of the ancient Near East. KAR 307, which dates to the 1st millennium BC and is 63 lines long, offers a lot of information about ancient Near Eastern cosmology. Another significant tablet from Ebeling's collection is KAR 158, which continues to be studied as containing one of the closest parallels to the biblical Song of Songs. KAR 44, otherwise known as the Exorcists Manual and composed by a figure named Esagil-kin-apli, is also prominent. Several important medical texts would also be included, but a future, more dedicated work by Ebeling and Reginald Campbell Thompson, namely the four-volume Keilschrifttexte medizinischen Inhalts, presented a collection of works that quickly surpassed KAR in enabling a broader understanding of Babylonian and Assyrian medicine.

== See also ==
- Electronic Text Corpus of Sumerian Literature (ETCSL)
- Keilalphabetische Texte aus Ugarit
- Patrologia Graeca
- Synodicon orientale
- Documenta Monophysitarum

== Sources ==
- Geller, M.J. (2018). "The Exorcist's Manual (KAR 44)". In Steinert, Ulrike (ed.). Band 9 Assyrian and Babylonian Scholarly Text Catalogues. De Gruyter. pp. 292–312.
- Heessel, Nils P. (2004). "Reading and interpreting medical cuneiform texts: methods and problems". Le Journal des Médecines Cunéiformes. 3 (1): 2–9.
- Horowitz, Wayne (1998). Mesopotamian Cosmic Geography. Eisenbrauns.
- Nissinen, Martti (2008). "Song of Songs and Sacred Marriage". In Nissinen, Martti; Uro, Risto (eds.). Sacred Marriages: The Divine-Human Sexual Metaphor from Sumer to Early Christianity. Penn State University Press. pp. 173–218.
- Speiser, E.A. (1969). Pritchard, James B. (ed.). Ancient Near Eastern Texts Relating to the Old Testament with Supplement. Princeton University Press.
