= Expositio officiorum ecclesiae =

Nuhrā d-Tešmeštā ʿEdtānāytā ("Commentary of the Ecclesiastical Services"), better known by its Latin title, Expositio officiorum ecclesiae, is an anonymous Syriac commentary on the East Syriac liturgy. Its author is usually referred to as Pseudo-George of Arbela (or Pseudo-Gewargis). The work is dedicated to a certain Daniel.

The Expositio is preserved in many manuscripts. It is the longest preserved Syriac liturgical commentary. Its date is uncertain. It was probably written in the ninth century, but perhaps as early as the seventh. It quotes the seventh-century author Abraham bar Lipeh, whose work is based on that of Gabriel Qaṭraya, and must have been written after the liturgical reforms of the Catholicos Ishoʿyahb III (r. 642–659). In the 18th century, Giuseppe Simone Assemani assigned the Expositio to George of Arbela, but he gave no reasons. As George lived in the tenth century, this attribution has been discredited. The Expositio has also been wrongly credited to ʿAbdishoʿ bar Bahrīz.

The Expositio is structured as a series of question on liturgical practices, divided between seven sections:

1. 24 questions on the liturgical year.
2. 21 questions on ramšā.
3. 9 questions on lelyā and ṣaprā.
4. 30 questions on the eucharistic mysteries.
5. 9 questions on baptism.
6. 8 questions on the consecration of a church at the start of every year.
7. 7 questions on funeral and marriage rites.

The Expositio has been translated into Latin, but not any modern language.

== Editions ==
- Connolly, R. H., ed. Anonymi auctoris expositio officiorum ecclesiae Georgio Arbelensi vulgo adscripta, II. Accedit Abrahae bar Lipheh interpretatio officiorum. Vols. 1 and 2. Louvain: Secretariat du Corpus Scriptorum Christianorum Orientalium, 1913–1915. Syriac text with Latin translation.
