= Documenta Monophysitarum =

The Documenta Monophysitarum (fully, the Documenta ad origines monophysitarum illustrandas; English: "Documents illustrating the origins of the Monophysites") is a two-volume scholarly edition and reference work of a collection of Syriac literature related to Miaphysite (Monophysite) Christian history. It was compiled and edited by Jean-Baptiste Chabot for the British Museum, with the text published in 1907 (Volume 1) and a translation and apparatus published in 1933 (Volume 2), as a part of the larger Corpus Scriptorum Christianorum Orientalium (CSCO) initiative. Nowadays, the Documenta is paired along with Monophysite Texts of the Sixth Century by Allen and van Roey, which includes select English translations of letters in the Documenta (alongside other Greek and Syriac sources), and includes a detailed overview of the contents of the Documenta.

Each Syriac document is accompanied by a Latin translation, along with an introduction and indices. The documents are chronologically ordered. All materials are derived from one manuscript, British Library Add MS 14602, representing a large collection of documents completed in 580 AD concerning the Miaphysite theology. Included are correspondence from leading Miaphysite figures, especially Theodosius of Alexandria, Paul of Antioch, Severus of Antioch, Jacob Baradaeus, and a number of other bishops and monks from Syria and Egypt.

The Documenta preserves many texts not found elsewhere and enables a much more detailed understanding of the Miaphysite (Syriac Orthodox) church. The most well known one is the Letter of the Archimandrites of Arabia, where a large number of Monophysite bishops across a large rural zone in Roman Arabia intervene into a Christological dispute over the Tritheist heresy. The letters demonstrate the presence of close ties between the Egyptian and Syrian Miaphysite patriarchates, as well as how leaders like Theodosius and Jacob Baradaeus responded to many of the salient theological controversies of the time, such as the Tritheist heresy. The letters of the Documenta also record the involvement of the Ghassanids, a major Arab kingdom of the time, in these disputes, as well as networks of monks and archimandrites.

== Contents ==
- I. Epistula synodica Theodosii Alexandrini patriarchae ad Severum patriarcham Antiochenum. A synodal letter from Theodosius (Patriarch of Alexandria) to Severus (Patriarch of Antioch).
- II. Epistula synodica Severi ad Theodosium. Severus's reply to Theodosius.
- III. Epistula Theodosii Alexandrini adversus Tritheitas. Theodosius's letter arguing against the Tritheite heresy.
- IV. Homilia de recta fide. A homily delivered by Theodosius in Constantinople on the "right faith," refuting Tritheism.
- V. Epistula eiusdem Theodosii quinque canones ecclesiasticos de eodem argumento continens. Theodosius's letter containing five ecclesiastical canons on the issue of the Tritheist heresy.
- VI. Formula subscriptionis a sacerdotibus Constantinopoli degentibus. A declaration drafted by priests in Constantinople formally subscribing to the doctrine of Theodosius.
- VII. Epistula eiusdem Theodosii ad Jacobum Baradaeum, Cononem Tarsi, Eugenium Seleuciae in Isauria, ceterosque episcopos orientales. Theodosius's letter to multiple Eastern bishops.
- VIII. Epistula eiusdem Theodosii ad episcopos orientales, de institutione Pauli patriarchae Antiocheni in Sergii locum. Theodosius to the Eastern bishops regarding the appointment of Paul as Patriarch of Antioch in place of Sergius.
- IX. Epistula episcoporum orientalium ad Theodosium. Letter of the Eastern bishops in reply to Theodosius.
- X. Epistula Theodori episcopi in Oriente ad Paulum patriarcham Antiochenum. Letter of Theodorus (an Eastern Miaphysite bishop) to Paul (Patriarch of Antioch).
- XI. Epistula Theodosii patriarchae ad episcopos orthodoxos Orientis. Theodosius's letter to the Miaphysite bishops of the East.
- XII. Epistula synodica Pauli patriarchae Antiocheni ad Theodosium patriarcham Alexandrinum. Synodal letter of Paul of Antioch to Theodosius of Alexandria.
- XIII. Epistula synodica Theodosii ad Paulum. Synodal letter of Theodosius to Paul.
- XIV. Epistula nonnullorum archimandritarum Orientis ad Theodosium Alexandrinum. Letter from certain Eastern archimandrites to Theodosius in Alexandria.
- XV. Epistula archimandritarum Orientis ad Paulum Antiochenum. Letter of Eastern archimandrites to Paul of Antioch.
- XVI. Epistula archimandritae et monachorum coenobii Aphtuniya ad Theodosium. Letter from the archimandrite and monks of the Aphthuniya monastery (in Egypt) to Theodosius.
- XVII. Epistula primum Theodosii Alexandrini ad Paulum Antiochenum. First letter of Theodosius of Alexandria to Paul of Antioch.
- XVIII. Epistula alterum eiusdem ad eumdem. Second letter of Theodosius to Paul.
- XIX. Epistula Theodosii ad Johannem, Leonidam et Josephum, episcopos in Aegypto. Theodosius to three bishops in Egypt (John, Leonidas, and Joseph).
- XX. Epistula Theodosii ad Theodorum episcopum. Theodosius to Theodorus.
- XXI. Epistula Theodosii ad populum Alexandrinum. Theodosius to the people of Alexandria.
- XXII. Epistula Aretae patricii ad Jacobum Baradaeum. Letter of Aretas (the Ghassanid king) to Jacob Baradaeus.
- XXIII. Epistula Jacobi Baradaei ad Eunomium episcopum. Jacob Baradaeus to Eunomius.
- XXIV. Epistula episcoporum orthodoxorum Constantinopoli degentium ad episcopos orthodoxos, archimandritas, presbyteros, diaconos, subdiaconos, lectores universumque populum fidelem Orientis. Letter from the Miaphysite bishops in Constantinople to their Eastern counterparts.
- XXV. Exemplar pacti quod factum est Alexandriae et in Urbe imperiali, inter episcopos orthodoxos et fautores Cononis. A copy of an agreement made in Alexandria and Constantinople between the Orthodox Miaphysite bishops and the supporters of Conon (a contested claimant to Antioch).
- XXVI. Exemplar alterius allocutionis seu apocaeroseos habitae Constantinopoli inter episcopos orthodoxos et fautores Cononis et Eugenii. Text of another address in Constantinople between Orthodox bishops and the supporters of Conon and Eugenius.
- XXVII. Exemplar anathematis adversus Iohannem Grammaticum (Philoponum) prolati. Copy of an anathema against John Grammaticus (or, John Philoponus).
- XXVIII. Exemplar primi anathematis ab archimandritis Orientis facti post mortem Theodosii patriarchae. Copy of the first anathema by Eastern archimandrites after the death of Patriarch Theodos.
- XXIX. Epistula Jacobi et Theodori episcoporum ad monachos orthodoxos. Letter of Jacob and Theodorus to the Orthodox monks.
- XXX. Exemplar alterius anathematis ab archimandritis Orientis facti. Copy of another anathema by the Eastern archimandrite.
- XXXI. Epistula nonnullorum ex archimandritis Orientis ad Iacobum episcopum. Letter from some Eastern archimandrites to Jacob.
- XXXII. Epistula Pauli patriarchae Antiocheni ad Iacobum et Theodorum episcopos. Paul to Jacob and Theodorus.
- XXXIII. Responsio Jacobi et Theodori ad Paulum patriarcham. Response of Jacob and Theodorus to Paul.
- XXXIV. Epistula archimandritarum Orientis ad episcopos et clericos orthodoxos Constantinopoli degentes. Eastern archimandrites to Orthodox bishops and clergy in Constantinople.
- XXXV. Epistula Jacobi ad Cononem et Eugenium. Jacob to Conon and Eugenius.
- XXXVI. Epistula Jacobi ad Johannem Ephesinum ceterosque episcopos orthodoxos. Jacob to John of Ephesus and other bishop.
- XXXVII. Epistula episcoporum orthodoxorum Orientis ad episcopos Orthodoxos Constantinopoli. Eastern Orthodox bishops to the Orthodox bishops of Constantinople.
- XXXVIII. Epistula eorumdem episcoporum ad Orthodoxos variarum dioecesium. Response by the same Eastern bishops to the Orthodox bishops.
- XXXIX. Epistula eorumdem ad clerum et populum Arabiae. The same bishops to the clergy and people of Arabia.
- XL. Epistula responsoria archimandritarum Arabiae ad episcopos orthodoxos. Response of the Arabian archimandrites to the Orthodox bishops.
- XLI. Solutio obiectionum (quas Iohannes Claudius, olim archimandrita monasterii Mar Bassi, proposuit Iohanni Sabae presbytero Theodosiopolitano) circa electionem Pauli patriarchae Antiocheni, a Sergio recluso, elaborata. "Solution of the objections" raised by John Claudius concerning the election of Paul of Antioch after Sergius was deposed.
- XLII. Epistula synodica Theodori patriarchae Alexandrini ad Paulum patriarcham Antiochenum. Synodal letter of Theodorus of Alexandria to Paul of Antioch.
- XLIII. Epistula synodica Pauli Antiocheni ad Theodorum Alexandrinum. Synodal letter of Paul of Antioch to Theodorus of Alexandria.

== See also ==
- Christianity in pre-Islamic Arabia
- Keilschrifttexte aus Assur religiösen Inhalts
- Synodicon Orientale
