= Giuseppe Furlani =

- Born: 10 November 1885; Pula, Croatia
- Died: 17 December 1962 (aged 77); Rome, Italy
- Known for: founding Italian Assyriology and Hittite studies
- Scientific career
- Fields: Assyriology and Semitic studies

Giuseppe Furlani (10 November 1885 – 17 December 1962) was an Italian archaeologist, orientalist, philologist, and historian of religions, and the founder of Italian Assyriology and Hittite studies.

== Biography ==
Giuseppe Furlani was born on 10 November 1885 in Pula in Croatia, at the time in the Austro-Hungarian Empire. His parents were Francesco and Luigia Damiani. In 1908, he graduated in law, and in 1913 in philosophy at the University of Graz.

Furlani travelled to Munich, Berlin, Paris, and London to pursue his studies in Oriental Philosophy. During the First World War he was secretary of the Italian governmental commission in London; this diplomatic assignment did not stop him from visiting London's libraries. Furlani hand-copied a great quantity of materials contained mainly in little-known Syriac manuscripts of the Near East. The study and publishing of his collection of notes occupied him for the rest of his career.

After the First World War he spent a year in Cairo teaching English and Arabic at the city's Italian high school; he thus had the opportunity to explore Egypt, Palestine, and Syria. After his tour in the Near East he returned to Italy where he obtained his degree in Semitic philology from the University of Turin. In 1922 he was hired to teach Semitic languages at the University of Turin, remaining in that position until 1925. In 1924, he taught Arabic and Babylonian and Islamic civilization at the University of Florence; one year later he was engaged by the university to teach Semitic philology and civilization of the classical East. The University of Florence appointed Furlani as associate professor in 1930 and full professor in 1931.

In 1933 he organized the first and only Italian excavation in Mesopotamia at Qasr Shamamuk.

After 1927, Furlani devoted most of his time to Assyriology. In 1940, he founded the field of academic Assyriology and Oriental antiquities in Italy at the University of Rome and, in 1951, became director of the Institute of Oriental Studies in Rome. He remained at that post until he reached retirement age in 1960.

Furlani died in Rome on 17 December 1962.

== Works ==
Furlani's complete bibliography, excluding encyclopedic entries, numbers 610 titles covering a wide range of disciplines and areas of research. His areas of expertise included the study of Greek philosophy on ancient Syriac theology and the Syriac tradition of Aristotelian term logic. Furlani wrote papers on the theology of Yaqub of Edessa, Bardaiṣan, Sergius of Reshaina, Giwargi bishop of the Arbela among other Syriac writers. He published the most important findings of his Syriac philosophy studies in I miei lavori dal 1928 al 1940 sulla filosofia greca presso i Siri [My works from 1928 to 1940 on Greek philosophy of the Syriacs].

Between 1948 and 1957, Furlani focused his works on Mandean lexicography, literature, and religion. In 1959 he co-authored a paper about the illuminated Rabbula Gospels which was his last Syriac-related work. Furlani's contributions to the history of religions cover the religion of the Canaanites, Hittites, Sumerians, Elamites, Babylonians-Assyrians, Urartu the Horites, Phoenicians, and Arameans.

=== Notable works ===
- La Religione babilonese e assira [The Babylonian and Assyrian religion], 1928-1929
- Il Sacrificio nella Religione dei semiti di Babilonia e Assiria [Sacrifice in the religion of the Semites of Babylon and Assyria], 1932
- La Religione degli Hittiti [The religion of the Hittites], 1936
- Grammatica babilonese e assira [Babylonian and Assyrian grammar], 1941

== Bibliography ==
- Bartoccini, Fiorella; Caravale, Mario; Pignatelli, Giuseppe (1998). Dizionario biografico degli Italiani (in Italian). Roma: Istituto della Enciclopedia Italiana. OCLC 1114892900.
- Cecchelli, Carlo; Furlani, Giuseppe (1959). Salmi, Mario (ed.). "The Rabbula Gospels: Facsimile Edition of the Miniatures of the Syriac Manuscript Plut. I, 56 in the Medicaean-Laurentian Library".
- Contini, Riccardo (2011). Brock, Sebastian P.; Butts, Aaron M.; Kiraz, George A.; Van Rompay, Lucas (eds.). ""Furlani, Giuseppe," in Gorgias Encyclopedic Dictionary of the Syriac Heritage: Electronic Edition". Gorgias Encyclopedic Dictionary of the Syriac Heritage. Archived from the original on 27 November 2020.
- Furlani, Giuseppe (1941). "I miei lavori dal 1928 al 1940 sulla filosofia greca presso i Siri". Rivista di Filologia e di Istruzione Classica. 19.
- Gran-Aymerich, Ève (2007). Les chercheurs du passé 1798-1945. CNRS Éditions. doi:10.4000/books.editionscnrs.7681. ISBN 978-2-271-06538-4.
- Ur, Jason; de Jong, Lidewijde; Giraud, Jessica; Osborne, James F.; MacGinnis, John (2013). "Ancient Cities and Landscapes in the Kurdistan Region of Iraq: The Erbil Plain Archaeological Survey 2012 Season". Iraq. 75: 89–117. doi:10.1017/s0021088900000425. ISSN 0021-0889. S2CID 822119.
