= Open Richly Annotated Cuneiform Corpus =

Cuneiform writing database project

The Open Richly Annotated Cuneiform Corpus, or Oracc, is an ongoing project designed to make the corpus of cuneiform compositions from the ancient Near East available online and accessible to users. The project, created by Steve Tinney of the University of Pennsylvania, incorporates a number of sub-projects, including online publications of lemmatized texts in different genres, as well as extensive annotations and other tools for studying and learning about the ancient Near East. The sub-projects are directed by individual scholars specializing in the relevant topic. The overall project is led by a steering committee of Tinney, Eleanor Robson of Cambridge University, and Niek Veldhuis of the University of California, Berkeley.

== Projects ==
Oracc currently includes several different kinds of projects. Some gather and present historical information for studying certain areas of ancient Near Eastern life or scholarship, including projects designed to contextualize specific textual corpora ("portals"). Others provide interfaces for searching corpora. These usually incorporate full transliterations and translations of texts in a given corpus, and many offer supplementary material such as an introduction to the corpus, discussion of its historical context, and interpretive syntheses of its content. A few other projects serve as research tools for Assyriological studies (dictionary, sign list).

=== Historical and cultural background ===
Project name	Description	Director
AEB: Assyrian Empire Builders	A portal providing context for the letters of the Neo-Assyrian king Sargon II and his administrative officials, with links to the relevant texts in Oracc's SAAo project.	Karen Radner at University College London (funded by the UK Arts and Humanities Research Council)
AMGG: Ancient Mesopotamian Gods and Goddesses	Provides thorough, encyclopedia-style articles on the major gods and goddesses of Mesopotamia.	Nicole Brisch (funded by the UK Higher Education Academy, 2011)
K&P: Knowledge and Power in the Neo-Assyrian Empire	A portal providing context for and interpretations of scholarly letters, queries and reports from the Neo-Assyrian capital of Nineveh, with links to the relevant texts in Oracc’s SAAo project	Karen Radner at University College London and Eleanor Robson at the University of Cambridge (funded by the UK Higher Education Academy, 2007–10)
Nimrud: Materialities of Assyrian Knowledge Production	An ongoing project intended to provide a collection of online resources concerning the ancient Assyrian city of Kalhu (modern Nimrud) and to create "biographies" of objects from the site.	Eleanor Robson at the University of Cambridge (funded by the UK Arts and Humanities Research Council)

=== Textual corpora ===
Project name	Description	Director
Amarna: The Amarna Texts	Provides searchable transliterations of the cuneiform texts found at Tell el-Amarna.	Contributed by Shlomo Izre'el
CAMS: Corpus of Ancient Mesopotamian Scholarship	Offers searchable editions of texts, divided into sub-projects (some of which also include contextual information and interpretations). Texts and corpora include the Epic of Anzu (project title Anzu); the Akkadian poem Ludlul bēl nēmeqi (project title Ludlul); texts on extispicy (project title Barutu); scholarly texts from four ancient “libraries” (project title Geography of Knowledge in Assyria and Babylonia, or GKAB) and Seleucid building inscriptions (project title Seleucid Building Inscriptions, or SelBI).	various scholars
CDLI: The Cuneiform Digital Library Initiative	Interface for searching transliterations of texts on the CDLI website (a project designed to make images and text of cuneiform documents available online).	Bob Englund at University of California, Los Angeles
CTIJ: Cuneiform Texts Mentioning Israelites, Judeans, and Other Related Groups	Provides searchable list of cuneiform texts relating to Israelite, Judean, and related population groups dating to the mid-first millennium BCE. Also offers a brief historical background to the topic.	Ran Zadok and Yoram Cohen (funded by the "Ancient Israel" (New Horizons) Research Program of Tel Aviv University)
DCCLT: Digital Corpus of Cuneiform Lexical Texts	Provides searchable, lemmatized transliterations of cuneiform lexical lists, as well as contextual information about the genre and specific lists.	Niek Veldhuis at University of California, Berkeley (supported by the National Endowment for the Humanities)
DCCMT: Digital Corpus of Cuneiform Mathematical Texts	Provides searchable transliterations and translations of cuneiform mathematical texts, as well as a brief introduction to the genre and tables of Mesopotamian measurements.	Eleanor Robson at the University of Cambridge
ETCSRI: Electronic Text Corpus of Sumerian Royal Inscriptions	Provides searchable, lemmatized transliterations and translations of Sumerian royal inscriptions, with an introduction to the material and thorough explanations of the lemmatization/glossing methodology.	Gábor Zólyomi at Eötvos Loránd University, Budapest (funded by the Hungarian Scientific Research Fund (OTKA))
HBTIN: Hellenistic Babylonia: Texts, Iconography, Names	Provides tools for studying individuals in Hellenistic Mesopotamian society, including: transliterations and translations of Hellenistic legal documents from Uruk and Babylon and links to the Hellenistic scholarly texts published in GKAB (see above under CAMS); images of seal impressions on Hellenistic Uruk legal documents; and information about individual names, and families.	Laurie Pearce at University of California, Berkeley.
Qcat: The Q Catalogue	An ongoing project listing and transliterating compositions in the Oracc corpus. This is different from Xcat and CDLI in that it lists abstract compositions, which can be preserved in many copies, rather than the physical tablets on which copies of a composition were written (e.g., it lists the story "Gilgameš, Enkidu and the nether world" as a single entry, even though many copies of this composition exist.	Eleanor Robson at the University of Cambridge
RINAP: Royal Inscriptions of the Neo-Assyrian Period	Provides searchable, lemmatized transliterations and translations of Neo-Assyrian royal inscriptions, along with indices and contextual historical information.	Grant Frame at the University of Pennsylvania (funded by the National Endowment for the Humanities)
SAAo: State Archives of Assyria Online	Provides searchable transliterations and translations of the compositions published in the series State Archives of Assyria, which include many corpora of Neo-Assyrian and Neo-Babylonian texts.	various scholars (transliterations and translations from the Neo-Assyrian Text Corpus Project, directed by Simo Parpola)
Xcat: The X Catalogue	Designed to be “a global registry of cuneiform manuscripts, supplementary to CDLI”. This and CDLI are different from Qcat in that they list individual, physical tablets rather than abstract compositions (e.g., they have a separate entry for each written copy of the composition "Gilgameš, Enkidu and the nether world").	Eleanor Robson at the University of Cambridge

=== Other projects ===
Project name	Description	Director
ePSD: electronic Pennsylvania Sumerian Dictionary	An online dictionary of the Sumerian language.	Steve Tinney at the University of Pennsylvania (funded by the National Endowment for the Humanities)
OGSL: Oracc Global Sign List	Aimed at providing "a global registry of sign names, variants and readings for use by Oracc".	Niek Veldhuis at University of California, Berkeley

== See also ==
- The Electronic Text Corpus of Sumerian Literature - an earlier project that partly complements those in the ORACC in terms of content
- Keilschrifttexte aus Assur religiösen Inhalts, a two-volume compendium of cuneiform tablets from 1919, a number of have been digitized into Oracc
