= Richard Connolly (monk) =

British monk (1873–1948)

- Church: Catholic church

Orders
- Ordination: 1899

Personal details
- Born: 1873 Carcoar, Colony of New South Wales
- Died: 16 March, 1948 (aged 74–75)
- Denomination: Catholic
- Occupation: priest
- Education: Christ's College, Cambridge

Richard Hugh Connolly (1873 – 16 March 1948) was a monk of Downside Abbey in Somerset, England, and a patristic scholar who was a major contributor to Syriac scholarship.

He was born at Carcoar in New South Wales, Australia, and attended St Stanislaus' College, Bathurst, in 1889. He continued his education in England at Downside and at Christ's College, Cambridge. He made his solemn profession at Downside Abbey in 1896, was ordained priest in 1899, and became Head of Benet House, Cambridge (1904–16), where he was closely associated with some outstanding patristic scholars in the university (J. A. Robinson, F. C. Burkitt, J. F. Bethune-Baker). His main work lay in the field of early Syrian Christianity. Barred for reasons of health from administrative or public roles he was trained by Edmund Bishop and belonged to a notable group of Cambridge Orientalists. He was a major contributor to the Journal of Theological Studies, the Downside Review and an early editor in the Corpus Scriptorum Christianorum Orientalium.

== Major works ==
- Life of St. Rita of Cascia (1903)
- Anonymi Auctoris Expositio Officiorum Ecclesiae Georgio Arbelensi Adscripta, I, T. CSCO 64(Scriptores Syri 25),1911; V. CSCO 71 (Scriptores Syri 28),1913;II Accedit Abrahae bar Lipheh Interpretatio Officiorum (Scriptores Syri 29 &32), 1913 and 1953
- Didascalia Apostolorum: Syriac Version, Clarendon Press, Oxford, 1929 (Oxford Reprints, 1970)
- The Liturgical Homilies of Narsai, translated into English with an Introduction. With an Appendix by Edmund Bishop (Texts and Studies, Vol. VIII, No.I, 1967)
