= Barhadbshabba of Hulwan =

Theologian and bishop

Barḥadbshabba of Ḥulwān was a 7th-century theologian and Christian bishop of the Church of the East who wrote many religious works and a history of the School of Nisibis which is of historical interest. Barhadbeshabba was a partisan of the theologian Henana of Adiabene, although he evidently was not caught up in his downfall.

Barhadbshabba is thought to have written The Cause of the Foundation of Schools, an account of the history of humanity, narrated as the history of a series of schools of thought going from the present day all the way back to Adam and Eve. He wrote it during his time at the School of Nisibis, where he instructed, in the late sixth century. The work has been translated into French by Addai Scher (1907) and into English by Adam Becker (2008).

In 605 he became the bishop of Holwan (modernly, near the western border of Iran). He was a signatory to the results of a synod called in 605 by Patriarch Gregory, documented in a collection of synodical records now known as the Synodicon Orientale. Barhadbeshabba also wrote controversial and exegetical works.

Some scholars identify Barhadbeshabba of Holwan with Barhadbshabba Arbaya, writer of an important church history, who was also at the school in Nisibis.

== Bibliography ==
- Becker, Adam H. (2006). Fear of God and the Beginning of Wisdom: The School of Nisibis and the Development of Scholastic Culture in Late Antique Mesopotamia. University of Pennsylvania Press.
- Becker, Adam H.; Childers, Jeff W. (2011). "Barḥadbshabba ʿArbaya". In Sebastian P. Brock; Aaron M. Butts; George A. Kiraz; Lucas Van Rompay (eds.). Gorgias Encyclopedic Dictionary of the Syriac Heritage. Gorgias Press. pp. 57–58.
- Brock, Sebastian (1997). A Brief Outline of Syriac Literature. Kottyam: St Ephrem's Ecumenical Research Institute.
- Ramelli, Ilaria (2018). "Barhadbeshabba of Halwan". In Nicholson, Oliver (ed.). The Oxford Dictionary of Late Antiquity, Volume 1: A–I. Oxford: Oxford University Press. pp. 212–213. ISBN 978-0-19-881624-9.
