= Season of Annunciation =

Syriac Christian liturgical season beginning in December

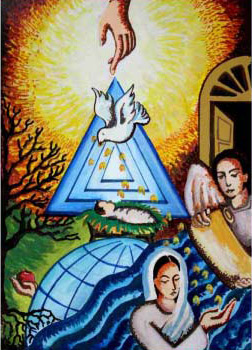
- Ancient Christian Icon depicting the Annunciation by St. Gabriel to Mary
- Official name: ܣܘܒܪܐ
- Also called: Suboro/Subbara/Suvara
- Observed by: Assyrian Church of the East, Chaldean Catholic Church, Syro-Malabar Catholic Church, Syriac Orthodox Church, Malankara Orthodox Syrian Church, Syro-Malankara Catholic Church, Maronite Church
- Type: Christian

The Season of Annunciation or Season of Announcements (Syriac: ܫܒܘܥܐ ܕܣܒܪܐ), also known by various Syriac transliterations such as Subara, Suvara, Subbara, or Suboro (Syriac: ܣܘܒܪܐ), is a liturgical season in Syriac Christianity. The name of the season is in reference to the Annunciation to the Blessed Virgin Mary, the announcement by the Archangel Gabriel to the Blessed Virgin Mary, that she would conceive and bear a son through a virgin birth and become the mother of Jesus Christ.

The Period of Annunciation is present in both the East and West Syriac rites, covering the Sundays before Christmas. In the East Syriac tradition, the liturgical year starts with the Period of Annunciation, and is equivalent to the season of Advent in the Western liturgical tradition. Like Advent, it is a time for the celebration of the Nativity of Jesus. But unlike Advent, the whole season is a celebration of the Nativity, while in Advent the first 24 days are a preparation for the Nativity on 25 December. Traditionally, in both rites, the depiction of the Annunciation has been popular in Syriac literature and art.

Historically, the Annunciation season in the Syro-Malabar Church came to an end in early January with the feast of Epiphany (Pindikuthi Perunnal) which was the more celebrated feast. But by the 20th century, due to influence of the Western tradition and the secular world, Christmas Day (December 25) became the focal point of the season. The season is also celebrated on March 25 in the Feast of the Annunciation.

== East Syriac Rite ==
In the East Syriac Rite, the Season of Annunciation, like Advent in the Roman Rite, marks the start of the liturgical year, and begins on the Sunday that falls between November 27 and December 3 inclusive. The season extends past Advent to also include Christmastide. However, the present-day liturgical calendar of the Syro-Malabar Catholic Church (one of the churches that uses the East Syriac Rite) regards "Annunciation" and "Nativity" as separate seasons, with the Season of Annunciation ending prior to Christmas. This is believed to be due to monastic influences, and the practice is known as Irupathanchu Nombu; in 1971, the liturgy for Subara was revised in Malayalam by the Syro-Malabar Central Liturgical Committee. The church considers the Feast of the Annunciation as a liturgical holiday.

In the Assyrian Church of the East, on the second Sunday of the season, the congregation will hear Gabriel's Annunciation to the Virgin Mary, followed by gospels the two Sundays after telling the mission of John the Baptist and the proclamation to Saint Joseph. The season closes with the Feast of the Annunciation, and lasts about seven weeks. The church has its own unique hymn assigned to the Book of Ḥudra for both the Season of the Annunciation and the Nativity; the opening of the Ḥudra begins with the first four Sundays of Subbara.

A separate commemoration of Subbara was added in the rite of the Chaldean Catholic Church. For the church, the season is composed of four weeks and usually begins on a Sunday (either December 1 or the first Sunday before).

== West Syriac Rite ==
Churches that follow the West Syriac Rite call this period the Season of Annunciation (as with the Syro-Malankara Catholic Church) or the Season of Announcements (as with the Maronite Church). In this rite, the season begins six Sundays before Christmas, making it coterminous with Advent in the Ambrosian Rite.

In the Syriac Orthodox and Malankara Orthodox Syrian Churches, the Suboro is considered one of the most important feasts in the liturgy; the Holy Qurobo is required for recital even if the Feast of the Annunciation falls on Good Friday, where it would otherwise be prohibited.

=== Assyrian tradition ===
Assyrians in the SOC (namely from Tur Abdin) maintain unique traditions in honor of the season of Suboro. This tradition, also called Suboro, takes place annually on March 25. A cultural/culinary tradition involves kneading unleavened dough and sprinkling grains on top; the daughter of the family then puts white and red yarn in the shape of the Cross on the dough before walking around town. During the making of the dough, families will also sing a hymn, The Bread of Life is Mine. All the available grains in the house will be added to the dough when cooking. The dough is then taken to the roof of the house and left to sit while hymns are sung; after church service, the bread is placed under the Bible and then served to the congregation.

The white and red yarn are also used to create wristbands, representing the interwined nature of the humanity (red) and divine resurrection (white) of Christ. The wristbands by themselves represent the appearance of the Archangel Gabriel to the Virgin Mary. Some bracelets also include black yarn, which can represent either the death of Christ or combine with the other colors to represent the Holy Spirit. The wristbands are worn until Easter, but they may also be worn until the Christmas holiday. Sometimes, the wristbands are burned under a pot of rice pudding.

Suboro is additionally practiced by Yazidis and the Mhallami, an Arabic-speaking ethnic group theorized to have Assyrian origins; the Mhallami create blue and white bracelets called Basımbar. The tradition is not as prominent among Mhallami compared to Assyrians, but is celebrated by a few today. Yazidis make bracelets on a special day during the year with additional green and yellow colors, and hang it on several objects like cars and houses, as well as their wrists. Another tradition from the Balkans, known as Martenitsa, is similar to Suboro.

== See also ==
- Advent
- Nativity Fast
- Feast of the Annunciation

== Bibliography ==
- Madhavathu, Maryann (2016). Liturgy as a Sacrament of the Paschal Mystery: A Study of the Theological Relations between the Liturgy of the Eucharist and the Liturgy of the Hours in the Roman and Syro-Malabar Rites (PDF) (Thesis). Katholieke Universiteit Leuven. Archived from the original (PDF) on 19 April 2021.
- Mon, James (March 2022). The Marian Spirituality as a Model for Joyful Christion Life in the Light of Pope St. John Paul II (PDF) (LTh thesis). Jnana Deepa, Institute of Philosophy and Theology.
- Ozer, Cagla (19 December 2019). "A monographic research on the Assyrian culinary culture in Turkey". Journal of Ethnic Foods. 6 (26) 26. doi:10.1186/s42779-019-0036-0.
- Sada, Eve Georges (December 2021). Assyrian-Syriac Chants from the Liturgy of the Church of the East (DMA thesis). University of Oklahoma.
