= School of Nisibis =

Christian catechetical school

Coordinates: 37°4′0″N 41°12′55″E

The School of Nisibis (Syriac: ܐܣܟܘܠܐ ܕܢܨܝܒܝܢ, for a time absorbed into the School of Edessa) was an educational establishment in Nisibis (now Nusaybin, Turkey). It was an important spiritual centre of the early Church of the East, and like the Academy of Gondishapur, it is sometimes referred to as the world's first university. The school had three primary departments teaching: theology, philosophy and medicine. Its most famous teacher was Narsai, formerly head of the School of Edessa.

The school was founded in 350 in Nisibis. In 363, when Nisibis fell to the Persians, St. Ephrem the Syrian, accompanied by a number of teachers, left the school. They went to the School of Edessa, where Ephrem took over the directorship of the school there. It had been founded as long ago as the 2nd century by the kings of the Abgar dynasty. When Ephrem took over the school, its importance grew still further. After the Nestorian Schism, when the Byzantine emperor Zeno ordered the school closed for its teachings of Nestorian doctrine, deemed heretical by Chalcedonian Christianity, the School moved back to Nisibis.

== Early history ==
The school was founded around 350 by Jacob of Nisibis (Mar Yaqub). Its model was the school of Diodorus of Tarsus in Antioch. It was an ideal location for a Syriac school: in the centre of the Syriac-speaking world but still in the Roman Empire, which had just embraced Christianity. Most of Mesopotamia was under Sassanid Persian rule, which had the ancient Zoroastrian religion as its official state-religion.

== Exile to Edessa ==
The Persians soon gained Nisibis, in 363, and the school was moved westward to an existing school in Edessa, Mesopotamia, where it was known as the 'School of the Persians' (Eskuli d-Forsoye/Eskuli d-Parsaye in Edessan Aramaic/Syriac). There, under the leadership of Ephrem, it gained fame well beyond the borders of the Syriac speaking world.

Meanwhile, in Antioch, Theodore of Mopsuestia had taken over the school of Diodorus, and his writings soon became the foundation of Syriac theology. Even during his lifetime, they were translated into Syriac and gradually replaced the work of Ephrem. One of his most famous students was Nestorius, who became Patriarch of Constantinople, but the doctrine he was preaching made him run afoul of Cyril of Alexandria. Cyril sought to brand Nestorius as a heretic, and at the First Council of Ephesus in 431, he had Nestorius formally censured.

The resulting conflict led to the Nestorian Schism, which separated the Church of the East from the Western Byzantine form of Christianity. The opponents of Nestorius attacked Theodore's School of Diodorus as well, and the Syrians answered by giving protection to the followers of Nestorius. In 489, the Byzantine emperor, Zeno, ordered the school closed for its Nestorian tendencies, and it returned to Nisibis.

== Centre of Syriac theology ==
Back in Nisibis, the school became even more famous. It attracted students from all the Syriac churches, many of its students embodied important church offices, and its teaching was normative. The exegetical methods of the school followed the tradition of Antioch: strictly literal, controlled by pure grammatical-historical analysis. The work of Theodore was central to the theological teaching, and men like Abraham of Beth Rabban, who headed the school during the middle of the 6th century, spent great effort to make his work as accessible as possible. The writings of Nestorius himself were added to the curriculum only about 530.

At the end of the 6th century, the school went through a theological crisis, when its director Henana of Adiabene attempted to revise the official exegetical tradition derived from Theodore of Mopsuestia. The controversy over Henana divided the Church of the East, and led to the departure of many of the school's members, probably including Babai the Great. A focus of the controversy was the debate between supporters of a one-qnoma (roughly "hypostasis") and of a two-qnome Christology, and the divide was worsened by interventions on the part of West Syriac miaphysites. Babai's attacks on Henana's one-qnoma theology came to be generally accepted by the Church of the East, though Henana remained a significant influence in the Church's subsequent tradition of interpretation.

The controversy over Henana and the monastic revival initiated by Abraham of Kashkar, supported by Babai, diminished the school's influence, and the spread of other schools founded on its model throughout the Sassanid Empire also reduced its centrality. In the first half of the 7th century, after the death of Henana in c. 610, the school seems to have entered terminal decline.

== Influence on the West ==
The fame of this theological seminary was so great that Pope Agapetus I and Cassiodorus wished to found one in Italy of a similar kind. The troubled times prevented their wishes from being realized, but Cassiodorus's monastery at Vivarium was inspired by the example of Nisibis that he had learned from the Quaestor Junillus during his time in Constantinople.

== Sources and evidence ==
Barhadbshabba of Hulwan's The Cause of the Foundation of Schools was delivered as a part of the curriculum of the new, incoming students of the School of Nisibis. It also narrates the founding of the school, its headmasters, and how its semester system originated. This makes the text an important source for understanding the history of the School of Nisibis.

== Notable students and teachers ==
- Patriarch Aba I, student and teacher
- Abraham of Beth Rabban, director 530–569
- Babai the Great, student
- Barhadbshabba Arbaya, teacher
- Barhadbshabba of Hulwan, student
- Barsauma of Nisibis, teacher
- Cyrus of Edessa, student
- Dadisho of Mount Izla, student
- Elishaʿ bar Quzbaye, director ?520s
- ʿEnanishoʿ, student
- Ephrem the Syrian, teacher
- Gabriel of Qatar, student (possibly)
- Gregory of Kashkar, student
- Henana of Adiabene, director 571–610
- Patriarch Ishoyahb II, student
- Joseph Huzaya, teacher
- Paul the Persian, student and teacher
- Patriarch Sabrisho I, student
- Severus Sebokht, teacher
- Thomas of Edessa, student and teacher

== See also ==
- School of Edessa
- School of Seleucia-Ctesiphon
- Academy of Gondishapur
- Syriac literature
- Nizamiyya
- Sarouyeh

== Bibliography ==
- Becker, Adam (2006). "The Scholastic Genre: The Cause of the Foundation of the Schools". Fear of God and the Beginning of Wisdom: The School of Nisibis and Christian Scholastic Culture in Late Antique Mesopotamia. Pennsylvania University Press. pp. 98–112.
- Becker, Adam (2008). Sources for the History of the School of Nisibis. Liverpool University Press.
- Brock, Sebastian P. (2005). "The Theological Schools of Antioch, Edessa and Nisibis". Christianity: A History in the Middle East. Beirut: Middle East Council of Churches. pp. 143–160. ISBN 9789953003436.
- Meyendorff, John (1989). Imperial unity and Christian divisions: The Church 450–680 A.D. Crestwood, NY: St. Vladimir's Seminary Press. ISBN 9780881410563.
- Reinink, Gerrit J. (1995). "Edessa Grew Dim and Nisibis Shone Forth: The School of Nisibis at the Transition of the Sixth-Seventh Century". Centres of Learning: Learning and Location in Pre-modern Europe and the Near East. Leiden: Brill. pp. 77–89. ISBN 9004101934.
- Seleznyov, Nikolai N. (2010). "Nestorius of Constantinople: Condemnation, Suppression, Veneration: With special reference to the role of his name in East-Syriac Christianity". Journal of Eastern Christian Studies. 62 (3–4): 165–190.
