= Khuzistan Chronicle =

Anonymous 7th-century Nestorian Christian chronicle

The Khuzistan Chronicle is an anonymous 7th-century Nestorian Christian chronicle. Written in Syriac in East Syrian circles, it covers the period from ca. 590–660, from the end of reign of the Sasanian ruler Hormizd IV (r. 579–590) to the aftermath of the fall of the Sasanian Empire (652). The work was a work of contemporary accounts and combines material from written sources and oral accounts. The chronicle was discovered by the Italian orientalist Ignazio Guidi (1844–1935), and is also known as Guidi's Chronicle or the Guidi Anonymous. It is an important source on the Arab conquests.

The Chronicle describes itself as "some episodes from the Ecclesiastica, that is, church histories, and from the Cosmotica, that is, secular histories, from the death of Hormizd son of Khusrau to the end of the Persian kingdom." The first part is a chronological outline of Sasanian and Nestorian history by the reigns of the Sasanian rulers from Hormizd IV to Yazdgerd III (r. 632–652) and the Nestorian patriarchs down to Maremmeh (r. 646–649). The second part of the work is an account of the conversion of some Turks by Elias of Merv, the third a list of towns founded by Seleucus I and the legendary rulers Semiramis and Ninus and the fourth a brief outline of the geography of Arabia. Between the third and fourth parts there is a brief continuation of the first part detailing the fall of Susa and Shushtar to the Arabs.

Some geographical details suggest that the chronicle was written in Khuzistan, hence its conventional name. The latest datable event mentioned took place in 652, and the Chronicle must have been composed no later than the 660s. It is incomplete as it stands, having lost its beginning. Despite the reference to written sources, it is clear that the chronicler relied heavily on oral reports. He frequently employs phrases like "it is said that" and similar.

Guidi presented the Chronicle at the 8th International Congress of Orientalists in 1889, and it was published with a Latin translation in 1903. Pierre Nautin has tentatively suggested Elias of Merv as the volume's author, though this "remains far from certain".

== Sources ==
- Brock, S. P. (2012). "Guidi's Chronicle". Encyclopaedia Iranica. Brill. doi:10.1163/2330-4804_EIRO_COM_2513.
- Wood, P. (2013). "Khuzistan Chronicle". The Encyclopedia of Ancient History. p. 1. doi:10.1002/9781444338386.wbeah30538. ISBN 9781405179355.
- Brock, Sebastian P. (2002). "Guidi's Chronicle". In Yarshater, Ehsan (ed.). Encyclopædia Iranica. Vol. XI/4: Greece VIII–Hadith II. London and New York: Routledge & Kegan Paul. p. 383. ISBN 978-0-933273-66-5.
- Ginkel, Jan van; Riedel, Meredith (13 September 2016). "Khuzistan Chronicle". In Dunphy, Graeme; Bratu, Cristian (eds.). Encyclopedia of the Medieval Chronicle. Brill Online.
- Hoyland, Robert G. (1997). Seeing Islam As Others Saw It: A Survey and Evaluation of Christian, Jewish and Zoroastrian Writings on Early Islam. Darwin Press.
- Jullien, Florence (2018). "Chronicle of Khuzestan". In Nicholson, Oliver (ed.). The Oxford Dictionary of Late Antiquity. Oxford: Oxford University Press. ISBN 978-0-19-866277-8.
- Penn, Michael Philip (2015). "Khuzistan Chronicle". When Christians First Met Muslims: A Sourcebook of the Earliest Syriac Writings on Islam. University of California Press. pp. 47–53. ISBN 9780520284937. JSTOR 10.1525/j.ctt13x1gz8.10.
- Teule, Herman G. B. (2010). "The Chronicle of Khuzistan". In Thomas, David (ed.). Christian–Muslim Relations, 600–1500. Brill Online.
