= Pindikuthi Perunnal =

Indian Christian festival

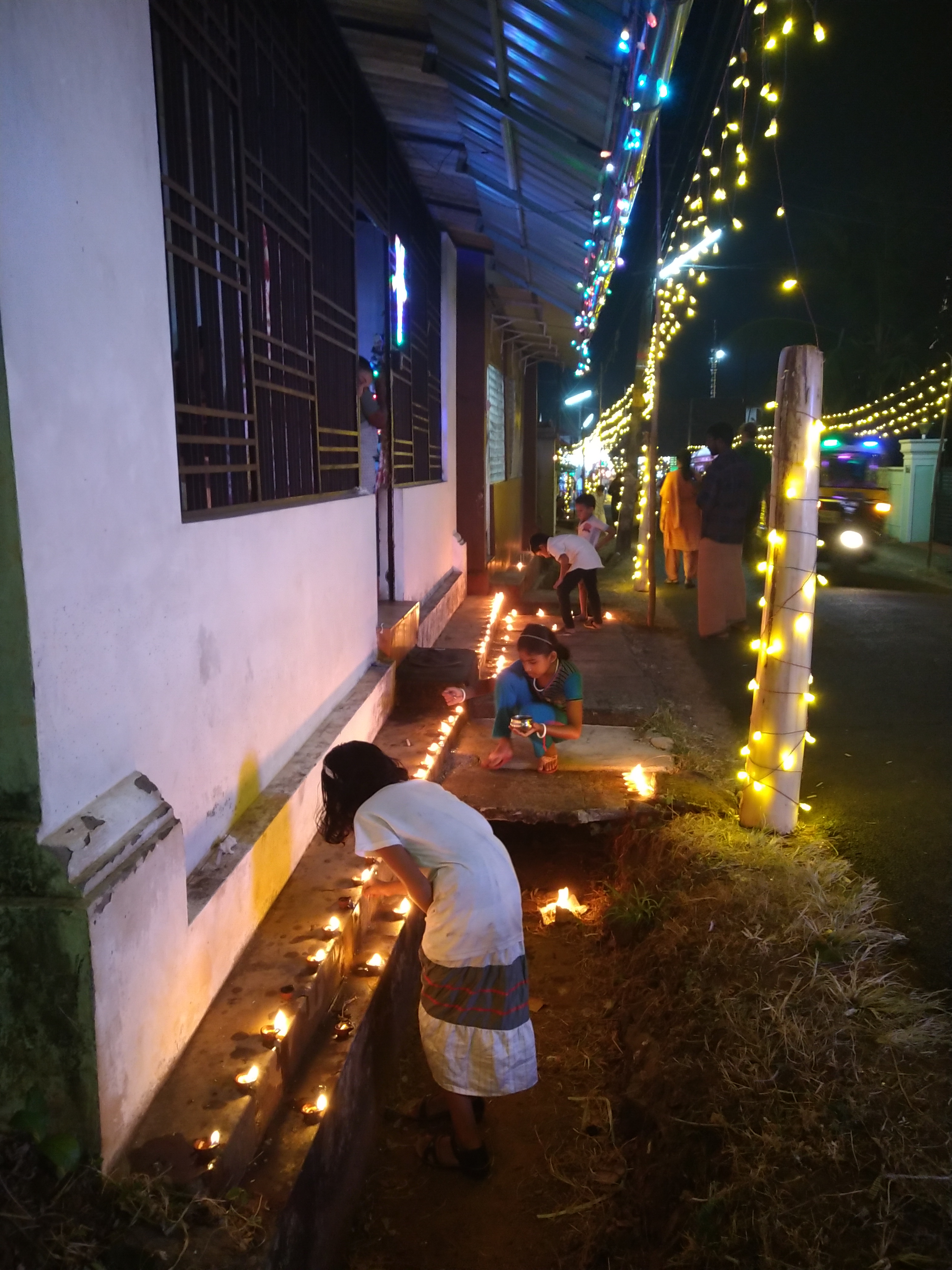
- Children lighting lamps on Pindikuthi Perunnal
- Also called: Rakkuli Perunnal
- Observed by: Saint Thomas Christians, Kerala, India
- Type: Christian
- Significance: Beginning of Epiphany season
- Observances: Decoration of plantain trunks with torches, oil lamps and flowers, Ritual bathing in night.
- Date: 6 January
- Next time: 6 January 2027
- Frequency: Annual
- Related to: Epiphany

Pindikuthi Perunnal (Malayalam: പിണ്ടികുത്തി പെരുന്നാൾ) or Rakkuli Perunnal (Malayalam: രാക്കുളി പെരുന്നാൾ) is a traditional and important festival of Saint Thomas Christians celebrated on 6 January. Pindikuthi Perunnal is the Saint Thomas Christian counterpart of Denha (Baptism of Jesus) in Eastern church and Epiphany in Western Church. The liturgical season Denha Kaalam (Epiphany season) begins with the Sunday nearest to Pindikuthi Perunnal. (Note: Syro-Malabar Liturgical Calendar (2019–2020), p. 4: "If the feast of Denha occurs on Sunday, then it will be considered as the first Sunday of Denha. When the feast of Denha comes on Sunday to Thursday, then these days would be counted as the first week of Denha. However, if it happens to be on Friday, the readings of the following Saturday would be the same of the first Saturday of Denha and the following Sunday as its First Sunday.")

== Etymology ==
The term Pindikuthi is a compound Malayalam word composed of pindi (പിണ്ടി) which means "trunk of the plantain tree" and kuthi (കുത്തി) which is the past simple form of kuthal that means "to prick or pierce". Therefore, Pindikuthi means "to prick or pierce the plantain trunk". Rakkuli literally means "bath in the night"

== Celebrations, rituals and practices ==
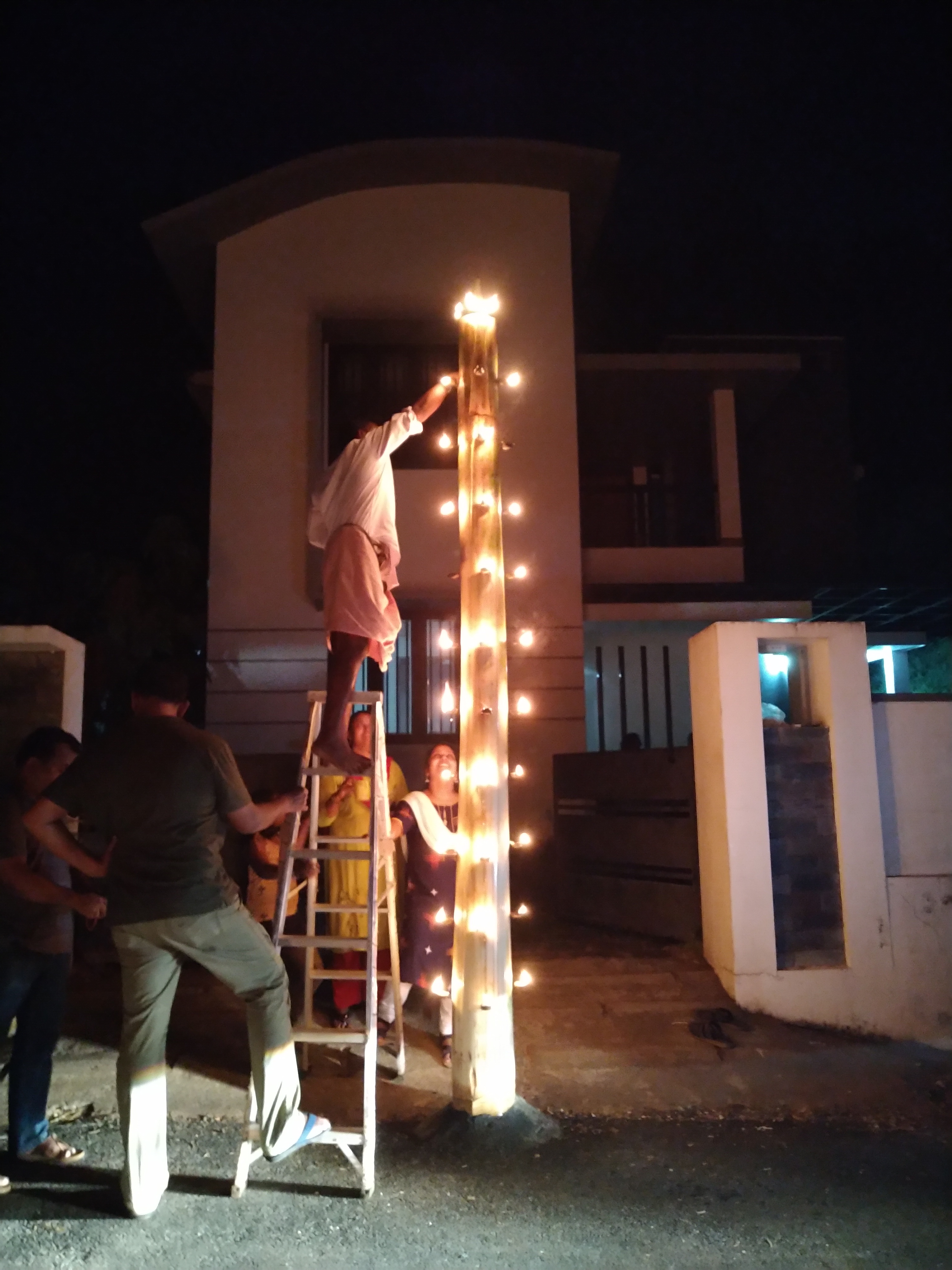
Lighting best plantain trunk in front of the house is the pride of every house owner.

A specially decorated plantain trunk is erected in front of houses with many torches attached to it. On the previous night of Denha celebration, family members used to go around it singing a Syriac hymn "El Payya", which means "God is radiant". Special dishes are prepared during this time, especially meat dishes. Some parishes organise competitions for the best decorated plantain. There are special prayers conducted in certain churches.

Saint Thomas Christians certain areas such as Palai and Pulincunnoo used to perform a ritual bath (in imitation of the Baptism of Jesus Christ in the River Jordan) on the previous night (ravu) of the feast of Denha in the rivers flowing near the churches in these localities after the solemn celebration of Ramsha, the Evening Liturgy.

Pindikuthi Perunnal (sometimes erroneously called Pindi Perunnal) is a prominent celebration in areas such as Irinjalakuda and Kunnamkulam. Most of the people in Irinjalakuda regardless the caste and creed await the festival for at least two or three months in advance. The main celebrations will start on the morning of previous day. The start of the festival is heralded by drumming which goes through the main roads of Irinjalakuda. This starts frenzied activities starting from preparing the right plantain in front of the house. placing a right plantain decorated in front of the house is a prestigious issue for every house owner.

There are also "Sacred Arrow" processes for each family unit, which starts on Saturday. The "Sacred Arrow" is to commemorate the arrows which pierced the body of Saint Sebastian. This is brought to each home to be venerated by the house members, to make offerings. This Sacred Arrow is escorted to the decorated chariots after sometime accompanied by a lot of fireworks. These happen mainly on Saturdays and Mondays.

The main festival is on Sunday. Everyone sporting a new dress eagerly participates in the procession or awaits it. The main procession starts by around 3:00 pm accompanied by prayers, and is preceded by heavy fireworks. People flock from various places to share the festivities.
