= Synodicon Orientale =

Compilation of synods of the Church of the East

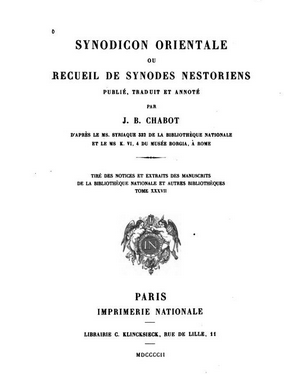
An image from the Synodicon Orientale

The Synodicon Orientale (or the Eastern Synodicon; Syriac: ܟܬܒܐ ܕܣܘܢܗܕܘ) is a compilation of Syriac literature concerning the synods and canons of the Church of the East from the early fifth to the late eighth century and is a reflection of the intellectual and political interests of the catholicosate of Baghdad. It provides information not only about ecclesiastical affairs, but also about the context of the church operating under Persian and Islamic governments. Only minor editorial revision is present with respect to anachronistic ecclesiastical titles, in a fashion that does not impact the historical reliability of the text. It was compiled in the late eighth or early ninth centuries under the direction of Timothy I of Seleucia-Ctesiphon. As it claims to be a complete compilation of synods, and the first synod that Timothy I held was in 790, it may date between 775 (the latest synod it records) and 790. However, it is embedded into an even larger text known as the Great Synodicon which was compiled in the 11th century and contains a much larger variety of historical and pseudo-historical writings. The Great Synodicon contains 80 items according to the numbering of Walter Selb, of which the Synodicon Orientale covers items 28–41. Chabot divided the manuscript of the Great Synodicon into three volumes: the Synodicon Orientale is the second volume, with the items before it composing the first, and the items after it the third.

The project that resulted in the collection of the Great Synodicon "points to the wish for a comprehensive, encyclopaedic assemblage of authoritative statements by the catholicoi of the past that could be invoked in current debates." The chronological arrangement of the materials provides an impression of the progressive recognition of the authority of the current collectors and church, and reflects a substantial library with which would have been needed in order to produce the text. The Synodicon was compiled alongside a law code going back to the time of Aba, entitled the "Ṭaksē d-dēne ʿtānāye wad-yārtāwaṯā" (ܛܟܣܹ̈ܐ ܕܕܝ̈ܢܹܐ ܥܹܕܬܵܢܝܹܐ ܘܕܝܪ̈ܬܿܘܵܬܵܐ) ("Orders of Ecclesiastical Judgments and Inheritances"). It further reflects the ongoing replacement of Iranian cultural norms and values with Islamic ones in its time. The collection of the Synodicon also initiated a textual tradition that pointed towards the catholicosate as a site of authoritative lawmaking for all Christians, and would result in the production of other works such as the Chronicles of Seert.

The name of the text was established by Jean Baptiste Chabot who published it under that title in 1902 along with a French translation. The text itself may refer to itself as the Book of Synods (Ktābā d-swnhdw).

== Manuscripts ==
The text is based on one manuscript: Alqosh Syr. 169 dating to the 13th or 14th century. The manuscript is currently stationed at the Rabban Hormizd Monastery (Monastery of the Chaldeans in Baghdad). In the 19th century, a copy of it was brought by Mgr. Joseph David to Rome, where it is now catalogued as Vat.Borg.Sir. 81–82.

Though additional manuscripts of the Synodicon Orientale are not known, additional transmission is present for some other sections of the Great Synodicon, as in Īlīyā al-Jawharī (c. 900) and Ibn al-Ṭayyib’s Fiqh al-Naṣrāniyya.

== Editions and translations ==
- Syriac text and French translation: Synodicon orientale, ou, Recueil de synodes nestoriens, ed. by J.-B. Chabot (Paris: Imprimerie nationale, 1902).

== List of synods ==
- Synod of Mar Isaac (410)
- Synod of Mar Yahballaha I (420)
- Synod of Dadisho' (424)
- Synod of Barsauma (484)
- Synod of Mar Acacius (486)
- Synod of Catholicos Babi (497)
- Synod of Catholicos Mar Aba I (544)
- Synod of Catholicos Mar Joseph (554)
- Synod of Mar Ezekiel (576)
- Synod of Mar Isho'Yahb I (585)
- Synod of Catholicos Sabarisho' I (596)
- Synod of Patriarch Gregory I (605)
- Synod of 612 after Death of Patriarch Gregory I
- Synod of Catholicos Patriarch George I (676)
- Synod of Mar Hananisho' II (775)

== See also ==
- Catholicos
- Dioceses of the Church of the East to 1318
- Documenta Monophysitarum
- List of patriarchs of the Church of the East
- Patriarchs of the Church of the East
- Syriac Christianity
