= Responsive reading =

Responsive reading is the alternate reading of a text between the leader of a group and the rest of the group, especially during worship or Bible study or during the reading of the Psalms at Bible reading time. Some hymnals include responsive readings, usually selected from the Psalms, in addition to the hymns.

== See also ==
- Call and response
- Christian worship
- Psalms § The Psalms in Christian worship
