= George of Arbela =

George of Arbela (Syriac: Giwargis bar Tobi (Note: His Syriac name may also be spelled Gewargis. Bar Tobi means son of Tobi.)) was an East Syriac churchman and author who served as the metropolitan of Mosul and Erbil (Arbela) from c. 960 until after 987.

George was relatively young man when he first put himself forward as a candidate for the patriarchate of Seleucia-Ctesiphon in 960/961. (Note: Patriarch Emmanuel I died in April 960 and his successor was consecrated in May 961.) Abū ʿAlī al-Ḥasan ibn Ibrāhīm, the Christian treasurer of the Emir Muʿizz al-Dawla, used his influence to procure the election of Israel of Kashkar. Already ninety years old, Israel died in September. George stood for election again when the metropolitans gathered in 963, (Note: Wilmshurst begins ʿAbdishoʿ's patriarchate in 963, but also six months after Israel's death, which would be March 962.) being passed over in favour of ʿAbdishoʿ I, the emir's preferred candidate. George stood down at the next patriarchal election in 987, since the Emir Sharaf al-Dawla, who had just taken Baghdad by force, recommended the bishops elect Mari bar Toba patriarch.

George was the author of a treatise on hereditary law. In the 18th century, Giuseppe Simone Assemani assigned the anonymous work known as the Expositio officiorum ecclesiae to him. Modern scholars do not believe it was written by George of Arbela and may instead refer to its author as Pseudo-George.
