= Barhadbshabba Arbaya =

Barḥadbshabba ʿArbaya (late 6th – early 7th century) was a teacher, historian and biblical commentator of the Church of the East. A native of Beth ʿArbaye, Barḥadbshabba was the chief instructor (bādūqā) at the School of Nisibis during the directorship of Ḥenana of Adiabene.

Although his perspective is that of an East Syrian, Barḥadbshabba made use of Greek sources. In the last chapters he outlines the history of the School of Nisibis and the School of Edessa.

Barḥadbshabba ʿArbaya is possibly the same person as Barḥadbshabba of Ḥulwān.

== Writings ==
Barhadbshabba Arbaya is thought to have written The Cause of the Foundation of Schools (according to its manuscript London, BL Or. 6714), an account of the history of humanity, narrated as the history of a series of schools of thought going from the present day all the way back to Adam and Eve.

He also wrote the History of the Holy Fathers Persecuted for the Sake of Truth, a history of the Church of the East from the beginning until the death of Abraham of Beth Rabban (569), the third director of Nisibis. It was probably written not long after 569. Its focus is on the 4th and 5th centuries, making it an important source for the Arian controversy and the dispute between Cyril and Nestorius. It is the oldest extant history from the Church of the East. Although his perspective is that of an East Syrian, Barḥadbshabba made use of Greek sources. In the last chapters he outlines the history of the School of Nisibis and the School of Edessa.

Besides his History, Barḥadbshabba wrote commentaries on the Gospel According to Mark and the Psalms. Only fragments of the former survive. According to ʿAbdishoʿ of Nisibis, writing in the 14th century, he also wrote "a book of treasures in three parts, and disputes (drāše) with all religions (deḥlān) and their refutation ... and a cause of the followers [school] of Diodore."

== Bibliography ==
- Becker, Adam H. (2006). Fear of God and the Beginning of Wisdom: The School of Nisibis and the Development of Scholastic Culture in Late Antique Mesopotamia. University of Pennsylvania Press.
- Becker, Adam H., ed. (2008). Sources for the History of the School of Nisibis. Liverpool University Press.
- Becker, Adam H.; Childers, Jeff W. (2011). "Barḥadbshabba ʿArbaya". In Sebastian P. Brock; Aaron M. Butts; George A. Kiraz; Lucas Van Rompay (eds.). Gorgias Encyclopedic Dictionary of the Syriac Heritage. Gorgias Press. pp. 57–58.
- Ramelli, Ilaria (2018). "Barhadbeshabba 'Arbaya". In Nicholson, Oliver (ed.). The Oxford Dictionary of Late Antiquity, Volume 1: A–I. Oxford: Oxford University Press. p. 212. ISBN 978-0-19-881624-9.
- Tannous, Jack (2010). "Barḥadbshabba ʿArbaya". In Graeme Dunphy (ed.). Encyclopedia of the Medieval Chronicle. Leiden: Brill. p. 143. doi:10.1163/2213-2139_emc_SIM_000682. ISBN 978-90-04-18464-0.
