= The Cause of the Foundation of Schools =

The Cause of the Foundation of Schools is a work of Christian Syriac cause literature by Barhadbeshabba written in the late sixth century. In this work, the history of humanity is presented as a speech about the history of the world, which it narrates as a series of schools of thought. The text is styled as a speech to the incoming students of the School of Nisibis, an educational center of the Church of the East, where Barhadbeshabba taught. The Cause is a key source for the reconstruction of the thought and history of the School of Nisibis, whereas its historical value for its larger account of the origins of much earlier Christian schools of interpretation is less reliable.

The Cause opens with a reflection on God's epistemological inaccessibility, before explaining how God has graciously illuminated the human mind and soul with cognitive faculties. Humans are capable of intelligence and action, both of which need to be perfected. By creating the visible world, humans can use their rationality to read from it God's work as its Creator. Through man's reflection on nature, some knowledge about God can be gained. God also provided schools to humanity, running all the way from Adam, through Jesus, and ultimately through Theodore and Narsai up to Henana and the present day. The Cause is, itself, presented as a pedagogical continuation of this scholastically transmitted project.

According to Adam Becker, Barhadbeshabba's Cause can be understood through several genres common to the Nisibis school, including East-Syrian cause Greek protreptic, scholastic chain of transmission, and collective biography.

In 2008, Becker published an English translation of the Cause. A French translation was published in 1907 by Scher.

== Structure ==
Adam Becker divides the Cause into seven sections:

1. An introductory discussion on the grace of God, who makes all things possible
2. A philosophical discussion of God's nature, his angelic pupils, and the creation of man
3. A "scholastic" history running from Adam to the prophets
4. Pagan teachers' poor attempts at the imitation of their predecessors
5. Renewal of the original school under Jesus and the succession of schools up to the time of Theodore of Mopsuestia
6. The school in Edessa, its closure, and the move to Nisibis, followed by the various heads of the school there
7. A description of the school year, and an exhortation and admonition to the students.

== Summary ==
The Cause is written in the first-person and follows uses a Greek rhetorical style. It is written as a speech that is given to incoming students at the Nisibis school which, at the time, was a leading educational and spiritual center of the Church of the East. The text begins by talking about God's goodness, wisdom, and power, and then the grace of God as it relates to God's self and his believers. Next, the text proceeds to discuss God's nature and the ability of mankind to learn about that nature; according to the Cause, it is through God's grace that he is epistemologically accessible to humanity. The text describes how the human soul and mind can begin to decipher God; it likens the human soul to a lamp and the mind inside of it as being illuminated by God's light. Because of how God created the world, the text argues that the mind's rationality can decipher order from God's creation and, from that order, infer God's status as its Creator. Next, the text describes the status, authority, and history of angels and humans in the world. Angels exist above the world, in the "heights". Humans, through life, death, and resurrection, can both ascend and descend from the heights. However, with Adam's sin because of the deception of Satan, humanity has fallen. When God created the world in six days, God's creative acts laid the basis for angels being able to learn about the Creator, and it provided angels with patterns through which they could make inferences about God's role in the world. By describing the methods by which angels learn from nature, the text sets them up as models for how students can learn in the classroom. According to the text, there are both lazy and diligent angels. Whereas the lazy angels failed, because of their complaints and distaste for God's command for them to pay homage to human beings, the diligent angels who succeeded at these tasks ended up with different professional roles in the celestial hierarchy. Once Barhadbeshabba has finished his description of the angelic classroom, he begins to talk about the schools of thought through the history of humanity. The first school, according to Barhadbeshabba, came with Adam and Eve when they received the laws of God on tablets. However, Adam erased these laws, and was ejected from this school. Next, Barhadbeshabba talks about the schools of Cain and Abel, Noah, Abraham, Moses, Joshua, Solomon, etc. For the Cause, the schools of thought of other groups, such as the Zoroastrians, were failed imitations of God's originally established school. For example, it criticizes their institution of close-kin marriage (xwēdōdah) practiced in the Zoroastrian, Sasanian empire. The schools of thought of the pagans, especially the Greek philosophers, are also talked about lengthily. The Cause does not create a blanket negative representation of them: instead, it discusses what was right and what was wrong in of the schools of Plato, Aristotle, Epicurus, Democritus, Pythagoras and the natural philosophers. The coming of Jesus renewed God's school, which was then passed on to figures like Saint Peter, Paul the Apostle, the School of Alexandria which founded the practice of the interpretation of scripture, and many post-Nicene schools like the School of Edessa. Finally, the Cause talks about the foundations of the School of Nisibis itself, which the author teaches at, and discusses its different principals, how its semester system came about, and it closes by exhorting its students to work hard and to avoid being led astray by Satan.
