= Corpus Scriptorum Christianorum Orientalium =

Collection of Eastern Christian texts

The Corpus Scriptorum Christianorum Orientalium is an important multilingual collection of Eastern Christian texts with over 600 volumes published since its foundation in 1903 by the Catholic University of Louvain in Belgium and the Catholic University of America in Washington, D.C. The present Secretary General is Andrea Schmidt of the University of Louvain (UCLouvain) in Louvain-la-Neuve.

240 volumes are devoted to Syriac writers. There are also sections for works in Arabic, Coptic, Ethiopic, Armenian and Georgian. The total number of publications also includes just over a hundred monographs. A prominent reference work from this series is the two-volume Documenta Monophysitarum.

The series is characterized by publications presenting a critical edition of the original texts in one volume and a translation in a second volume (there are some exceptions though).

The series was originally printed by different printing offices, each specialized in representing ancient characters in print. Today, only one of these specialized printers is responsible for the production and publication of the volumes. Peeters (formerly known as 'Orientaliste'), who established also an international academic publishing house in the 20th century, is responsible for the distribution of the books. All volumes of the series are still in print.
