= Chronicle of Seert =

9th-11th century ecclesiastical history

- Author(s): anonymous Church of the East author
- Ascribed to: Ishoʿdnah of Basra (allegedly)
- Language: Arabic
- Date: Sometime between the 9th-11th centuries
- Genre: ecclesiastical history
- Subject: history of the Church of the East
- Period covered: fifth to seventh centuries
- Sources: Greek or Syriac histories

The Chronicle of Seert, sometimes called the Histoire nestorienne, is an ecclesiastical history written in Arabic by an anonymous Christian writer from the Church of the East, at an unknown date between the ninth and the eleventh century. There are grounds for believing that it is the work of Ishoʿdnah of Basra, who flourished in the second half of the ninth century.

Only part of the original text has survived. The surviving text consists of two long extracts, covering the years 251–422 and 484–650 respectively. The portion of the text covering events beyond the middle of the 7th century has been lost. Parallel to it in some parts is a Haddad Chronicle (also known as the Brief Ecclesiastical Chronicle) first described by Butros Haddad in 1986 and published by him in 2000. The lost Ecclesiastical History of Daniel bar Maryam is sometimes thought to have been a major source of the Chronicle of Seert.

The Chronicle deals with ecclesiastical, social, and political issues of the Persian Christian church giving a history of its leaders and notable members. It details the growth and prospering of the Nestorian Church despite alternating periods of persecution and toleration under the Zoroastrian rulers of Sassanid Persia. The work then celebrates the triumph of the Muslim conquerors in the 7th century as liberators from increasing Zoroastrian oppression.

"The Arabs treated them with generosity and by the grace of God (may He be exalted) prosperity reigned and the hearts of Christians rejoiced at the ascendancy of the Arabs. May God affirm and make it triumphant!"

It is not clear when the Chronicle of Seert was written. It cannot have been written earlier than the ninth century, as at one point in the text the author quotes the Church of the East patriarch Ishoʿ Bar Nun (823-4). Some scholars believe that the Chronicle is the work of the ninth-century author Ishoʿdnah of Basra, who is known to have written a three-volume ecclesiastical history. Others put the date of composition as late as the eleventh century.

The Chronicle of Seert was edited by Addai Scher, the Chaldean Catholic archbishop of Seert, and published as several fascicles (Arabic text with French translation) in the series Patrologia Orientalis between 1910 and 1919.

== Editions and translations ==
- Alcock, Anthony (english tr.). "The Chronicle of Séert". (2014) Online
- Scher, Addai (ed. and french tr.). "Histoire nestorienne inédite: Chronique de Séert. Première partie." Patrologia Orientalis 4.3 (1908), 5.2 (1910).
- Scher, Addai (ed. and frenchtr.). "Histoire nestorienne inédite: Chronique de Séert. Seconde partie." Patrologia Orientalis 7.2 (1911), 13.4 (1919).
