= Synod of Beth Lapat =

484 council of the Church of the East, held in Gundeshapur, Persia

Coordinates: 32°17′N 48°31′E

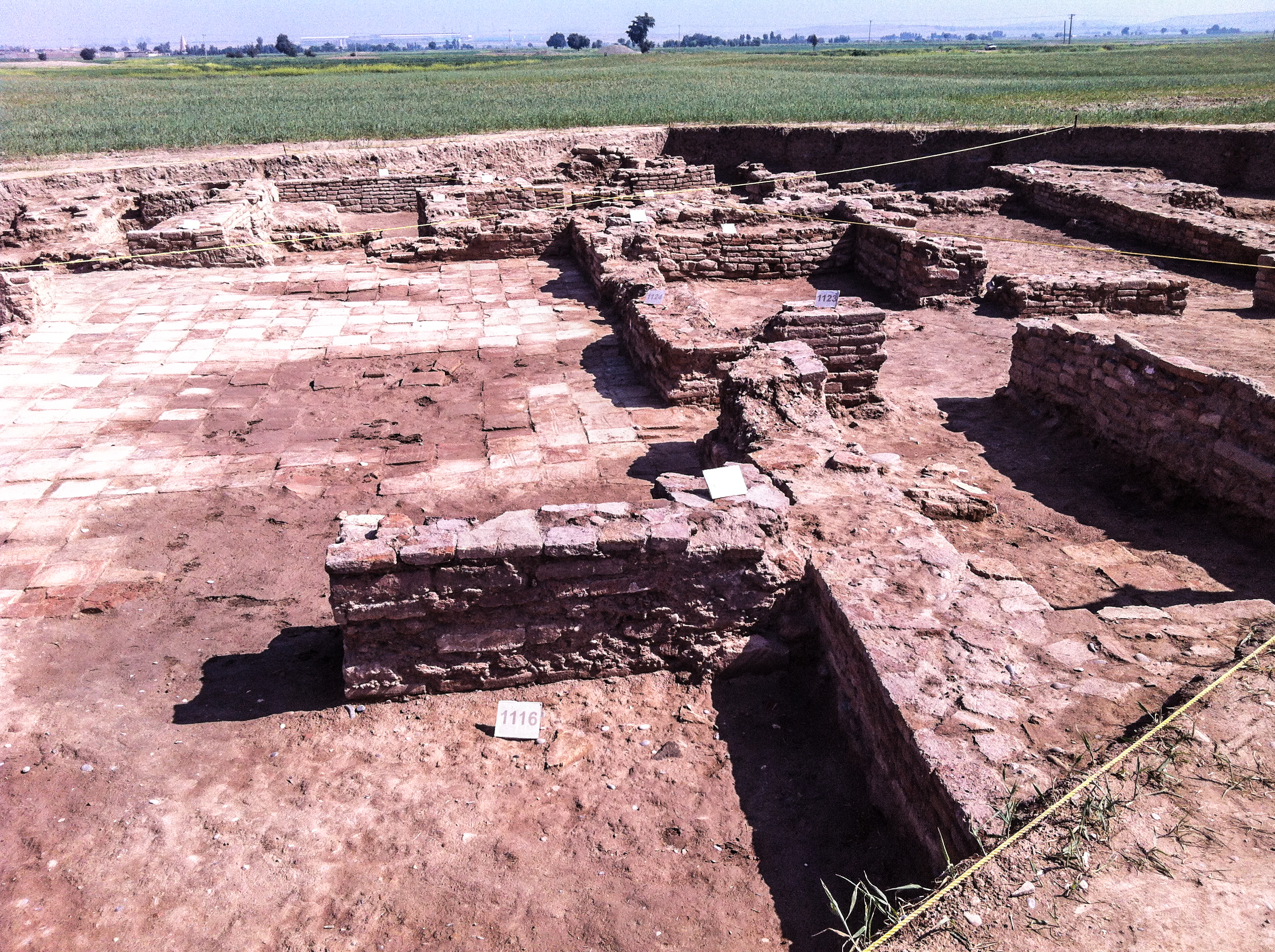
Archeological remains of the ancient city of Gundeshapur (Beth Lapat)

The Synod of Beth Lapat, also known as the Synod of Barsauma, was a local council of the Church of the East, that was held in 484, in the Persian city of Gundeshapur (Bēth Lapaṭ, in the Syriac language). The council was headed by Metropolitan Barsauma of Nisibis (d. 491), who was involved in a long conflict with Patriarch Babowai of Seleucia-Ctesiphon (d. 484). No acts of this synod have been preserved, but fragmentary data from other sources suggest that various ecclesiological issues had been discussed, and that disciplinary canons against simony were adopted. Since Metropolitan Barsauma was involved in christological disputes, it is believed that several doctrinal questions were also discussed, and some later sources (acts of the synod held in 605) suggest that synod of 484 adopted a resolution in support of theological teachings of Theodore of Mopsuestia (d. 428). Since no creeds or theological decisions of this council have been preserved, its outcome has been the subject of various assumptions among scholars.

In older scholarly works, the Synod of Beth Lapat was often regarded as a defining council, that marked the official acceptance of Nestorianism by the Church of the East. Such views have been criticized by modern scholars, who pointed out that theological works of Nestorius (d. c. 450), who was condemned at the Council of Ephesus in 431, were not translated into Syriac language before the 6th century, long after the synod of 484, that regarded works of Theodore of Mopsuestia as source for theological guidance.

== See also ==
- Acacius of Seleucia-Ctesiphon
- Babai of Seleucia-Ctesiphon

== Sources ==
- Baum, Wilhelm; Winkler, Dietmar W. (2003). The Church of the East: A Concise History. London-New York: Routledge-Curzon.
- Brock, Sebastian P. (1999). "The Christology of the Church of the East in the Synods of the Fifth to Early Seventh Centuries: Preliminary Considerations and Materials". Doctrinal Diversity: Varieties of Early Christianity. New York and London: Garland Publishing. pp. 281–298.
- Brock, Sebastian P. (2006). Fire from Heaven: Studies in Syriac Theology and Liturgy. Aldershot: Ashgate.
- Chabot, Jean-Baptiste (1902). Synodicon orientale ou recueil de synodes nestoriens (PDF). Paris: Imprimerie Nationale.
- Meyendorff, John (1989). Imperial unity and Christian divisions: The Church 450-680 A.D. Crestwood, NY: St. Vladimir's Seminary Press.
- Wigram, William Ainger (1910). An Introduction to the History of the Assyrian Church or The Church of the Sassanid Persian Empire 100-640 A.D. London: Society for Promoting Christian Knowledge.
- Wilmshurst, David (2011). The martyred Church: A History of the Church of the East. London: East & West Publishing Limited.
