= Mana of Pars =

Persian Christian theologian and East Syriac metropolitan

Mar Maʽna
- Metropolitan of Beth Parsaye and Beth Hendwaye
- Church: Church of the East
- Province: Pars
- See: Pars (Rev Ardashir, Shiraz)
- Appointed: Aba I
- Installed: 540
- Predecessor: Ishoʽbokth, Aqacius
- Previous post: Bishop of Arzun

Orders
- Rank: Metropolitan bishop

Personal details
- Born: 5th century Shiraz ?
- Died: 6th century
- Denomination: East Syriac Christianity
- Education: School of Edessa, School of Nisibis

Maʽna, also known as Maʽna of Pars, Maʽna of Rev Ardashir or Maʽna of Shiraz, was a Persian Christian theologian, author and an East Syriac metropolitan bishop of Pars during the 5th and 6th centuries AD.

Maʽna is chiefly noted for the translation of Syriac and Greek Christian literature into Pahlavi language. He is the first Christian writer known to have written in Persian and is generally attributed with the translation of the Pahlavi Psalter from the Syriac Peshitta.

== Identity ==
The biography of Maʽna is largely shrouded in mystery due to the unavailability of clear and complete historical documentation. There has been significant degree of confusion in determining his identity due to the fact that a number of different individuals have been known by the name Maʽna in the 5th and 6th centuries in the East Syriac church. These include Maʽna, an East Syriac catholicos, as well as another individual known as Maʽna Shirazi.

The chief sources for Maʽna include, the Chronicle of Seert, an important historical document of the Church of the East, and the Ecclesiastical chronicles of Bar Ebroyo. Maʽna was one of the Nestorian scholars of the School of Edessa who took refuge in Sassanid Mesopotamia after the school was forcefully shut down by the Roman Empire due to its alleged Nestorian tendencies. He, along with his colleagues under the leadership of Narsai, moved to Nisibis and revitalized its ancient school of Christian learning under the patronage of Barsauma, the Metropolitan of Nisibis. There, he became the mentor of Mar Aba and later was appointed as the Metropolitan bishop of Pars while serving as the bishop of Arzun. While being in Pars, he dedicated himself for the evangelization of the local Persians and the people from distant regions that was under his metropolitan authority by the translation of Syriac religious and liturgical texts into the vernacular Pahlavi language.

== Biography ==
Information about Maʽna's early life is obscure. He is first mentioned as one among the teachers in the catechetical school of Edessa. The school is noted for its allegiance towards the Antiochene school of christology and its support for the Antiochene theologians. There he was involved in translation of the Greek liturgical and theological texts of Diodore of Tarsus and Theodore of Mopsuestia into Classical Syriac, most of which are now lost. Following the Nestorian controversy of the 5th century in the Roman Imperial church, the perceived pro-Nestorian tendencies of the school eventually led to its censure and later in 489, its complete closure by the Emperor Zeno. This necessitated Maʽna and his colleagues led by their leader Narsai to take refuge in the Sassanid Empire where they would eventually settle at and revitalize the ancient school of Nisibis. Maʽna resumed teaching in Nisibis and could gather a number of students including Mar Aba. Maʽna having been appointed as the bishop of the nearby town of Arzun, was accompanied by Aba, his devoted student who started teaching under his guidance.

Maʽna was one of the bishops involved in the election of Aba as catholicos of Seleucia-Ctesiphon in a move to heal the schisms within the church that had been resulted from the parallel administration of the rival catholicoi Elisha and Narsai and political interference from the Empire. Aba initiated a crusade to remove parallel administration of dioceses by multiple bishops appointed by the former rival catholicoi. In 540, he entrusted the ecclesiastical province of Pars to Maʽna and removed the two rival bishops, namely Ishobokth and Aqaq from office, installing Mana in their place.

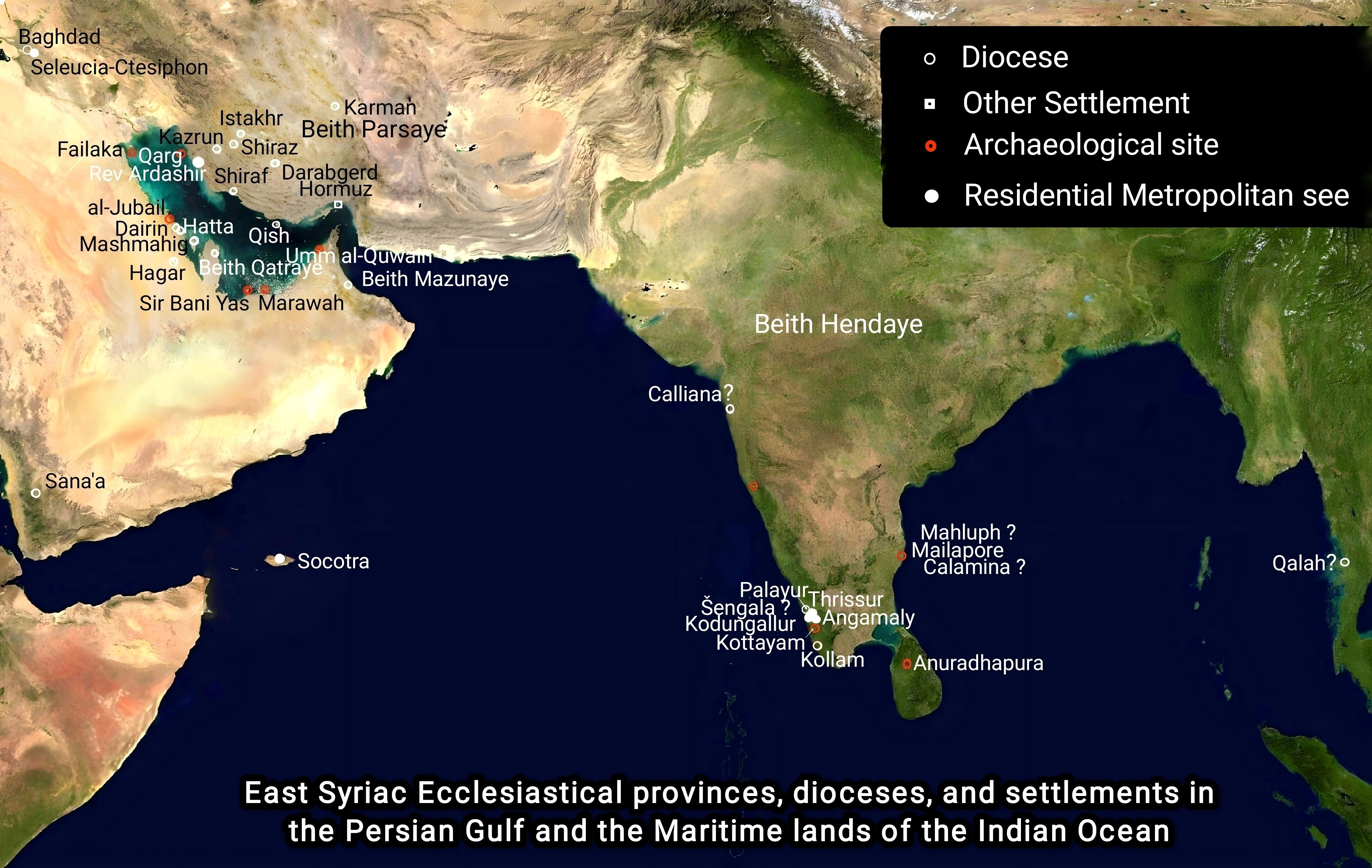
The Persian Church and its maritime Christian settlements along the Indian Ocean

Maʽna's archiepiscopal ministry in Pars is noted for his efforts to evangelize the local Persians and multitude of Christian communities in the distant maritime regions of the Indian Ocean including Beth Qatraye and India by translating Syriac liturgical hymns, discourses and responses into Pahlavi and supplying them to the local churches for fulfilling their liturgical requirements. He is also believed to have translated the Psalms from the Peshitta into Pahlavi. Contemporary Persian Christian presence in the Indian Subcontinent and islands, such as Sri Lanka and Socotra, is confirmed from the account of Cosmas Indicopleustes, an Alexandrian disciple of Mar Aba.

== The Pahlavi Psalter ==
Apart from the Pahlavi hymns and liturgical compositions, the most important work attributed to Mar Maʽna is the Pahlavi Book of Psalms. Pars, especially in its urban centers like Shiraz and Rev Ardashir, is known to have housed, since the time of the Babylonian exile, an important settlement of Jews, who gradually ended up being a Persian speaking community. It is highly probable that Maʽna may have thought it was desirable to have a translation of the psalter in Persian for the use of the Persian-speaking people. This vernacular translation of the psalms highly impressed Mar Aba, who is said to have added to it the Pahlavi translation of the Canons he composed in Syriac and led the process of copying the entire psalter for use in the East Syriac church's dioceses both within Sassanid regions and the vast exterior mission areas including Central Asia and China.
