= Beth Huzaye (East Syriac ecclesiastical province) =

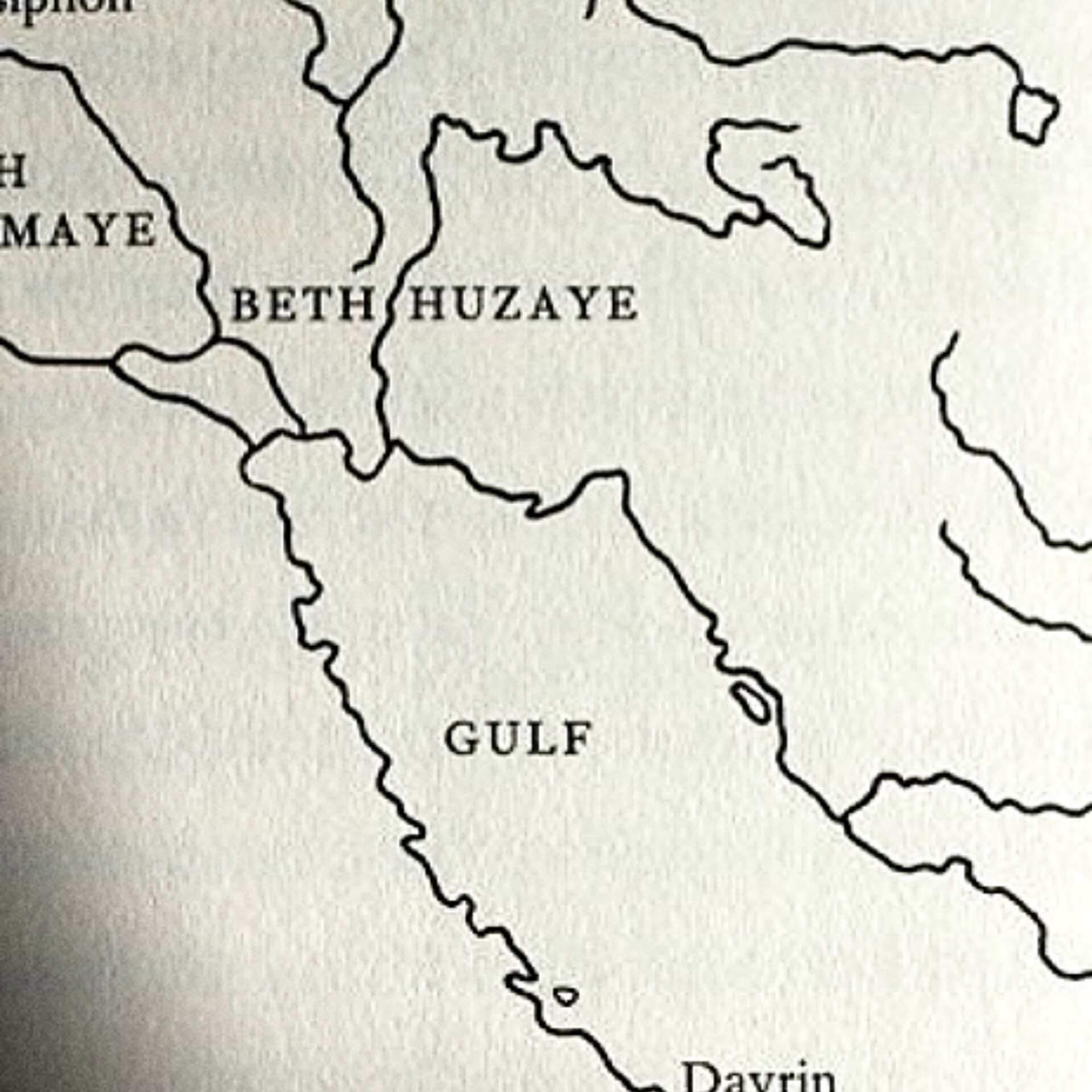
Beth Huzaye

Beth Huzaye (Classical Syriac: ܒܝܬ ܗܘܙܝܐ, romanized: Bēṯ Huzāyē) or ʿIlam was an East Syriac metropolitan province of the Church of the East, between the fifth and fourteenth centuries. The names refer to Khuzestan and Elam, respectively.

The metropolitan bishops of Beth Huzaye sat at Gundeshapur (Classical Syriac: ܒܝܬ ܠܦܛ, romanized: Bēṯ Lap̄aṭ,. The metropolitan province of Beth Huzaye had a number of suffragan dioceses at different periods in its history, including Karka d-Ledan, Ahvaz, Shushtar, Susa, Isfahan, Mihrajanqadhaq and Ramhormoz. The Diocese of Shahpur Khwast may also have been a suffragan diocese of the province of Beth Huzaye.

== Background ==
The bishop of Beth Lapat was recognised as metropolitan of Beth Huzaye in Canon XXI of the Council of Seleucia-Ctesiphon in 410. The metropolitan of Beth Huzaye ranked above the metropolitans of the other four metropolitan provinces established in 410 (Nisibis, Meshan, Adiabene, and Beth Garmaï), and was responsible for the suffragan dioceses of Karka d-Ledan, Hormizd Ardashir (Ahvaz), Shushter and Susa.

== Ecclesiastical history ==
The metropolitan of Beth Huzaye (ʿIlam or Elam), who resided in the town of Beth Lapat (Veh az Andiokh Shapur), enjoyed the right of consecrating a new patriarch. In 410 it was not possible to appoint a metropolitan for Beth Huzaye, as several bishops of Beth Lapat were competing for precedence and the synod declined to choose between them. Instead, it merely laid down that once it became possible to appoint a metropolitan, he would have jurisdiction over the dioceses of Karka d'Ledan, Hormizd Ardashir, Shushter and Susa. These dioceses were all founded at least a century earlier, and their bishops were present at most of the synods of the fifth and sixth centuries. A bishop of Ispahan was present at the synod of Dadishoʿ in 424, and by 576 there were also dioceses for Mihraganqadaq (probably the 'Beth Mihraqaye' included in the title of the Diocese of Ispahan in 497) and Ram Hormizd (Ramiz).

Only four of these seven dioceses were still in existence at the end of the ninth century. The Diocese of Ram Hormizd seems to have lapsed, and the dioceses of Karka d'Ledan and Mihrganqadaq had been combined with the dioceses of Susa and Ispahan respectively. In 893 Eliya of Damascus listed four suffragan dioceses in the 'eparchy of Jundishapur', in the following order: Karkh Ladan and al-Sus (Susa and Karka d'Ledan), al-Ahwaz (Hormizd Ardashir), Tesr (Shushter) and Mihrganqadaq (Ispahan and Mihraganqadaq). Shahpur Khwast may also have briefly been a diocese in the province of Beth Huzaye. It is doubtful whether any of these dioceses survived into the fourteenth century. The Diocese of Shushter is last mentioned in 1007/8, Hormizd Ardashir in 1012, Ispahan in 1111 and Susa in 1281. Only the metropolitan Diocese of Jundishapur certainly survived into the fourteenth century, and with additional prestige. ʿIlam had for centuries ranked first among the metropolitan provinces of the Church of the East, and its metropolitan enjoyed the privilege of consecrating a new patriarch and sitting on his right hand at synods. By 1222, in consequence of the demise of the Diocese of Kashkar in the province of the patriarch, he had also acquired the privilege of guarding the vacant patriarchal throne.

== The Diocese of Beth Lapat (Gondeshabur) ==
The bishop Gadyahb (or Gadhimhab) of Beth Lapat was one of several East Syriac bishops who opposed the claim to precedence put forward by the bishop Papa bar Aggai of Seleucia-Ctesiphon in 315.

In 410, there were several rival bishops of Beth Lapat, and Canon XXI of the synod of Seleucia-Ctesiphon merely recorded that 'for the metropolis of Beth Lapat there is not yet a bishop whose name we can inscribe among his fellow-metropolitans, since the town has two or three bishops not recognised by the synod'. The bishops Yazdaidad, Agapit, Miles, Bar Shabtha, Mari, and Shila were among the thirty-eight signatories of the synod's acts, and from their position in the list were probably the bishops concerned.

The bishop Agapit of Beth Lapat was among the signatories of the acts of the synods of Yahballaha I in 420 and Dadishoʿ in 424.

The bishop Papa, 'bishop of Beth Lapat, metropolitan of Beth Huzaye', was among the signatories of the acts of the synod of Acacius in 486.

The deacon Pusaï was among the signatories of the acts of the synod of Babaï in 497 on behalf of the metropolitan Marwaï of Beth Huzaye.

The Paul of Seleucia-Ctesiphon, who had earlier been bishop of Hormizd Ardashir, was elected patriarch in 539.

The metropolitan Paul of Beth Huzaye was among the bishops who rallied to the patriarch Aba I in 540 and signed his Pragmatic.

The bishop Shemʿon, 'bishop, metropolitan of Beth Huzaye', was among the signatories of the acts of the synod of Joseph in 554.

The bishop Dalaï, 'bishop, metropolitan of Beth Huzaye', was among the signatories of the acts of the synod of Ezekiel in 576.

The bishop Baraz, 'metropolitan of Beth Huzaye', was among the signatories of the acts of the synod of Ishoʿyahb I in 585.

The patriarch Maremmeh (646–50), formerly bishop of Nineveh, was consecrated metropolitan of ʿIlam by the patriarch Ishoʿyahb II (628–46).

The metropolitan Yaʿqob of ʿIlam was elected patriarch after the degradation of the patriarch Surin, and was consecrated in 751/2.

The patriarch Giwargis II (828–31), formerly superior of the monastery of Beth ʿAbe, was consecrated metropolitan of ʿIlam by Timothy I c. 807 at the request of Caliph Harun al-Rashid's powerful court physician Jabril ibn Bukhtishu. He was metropolitan of ʿIlam 'for twenty years', and was consecrated patriarch on 16 June 828 on the death of Ishoʿ bar Nun.

The patriarch Theodosius of Beth Garmaï (853–8) was consecrated bishop of Anbar by the patriarch Sabrishoʿ II (831–5) and later became metropolitan of ʿIlam.

The bishop Theodore of Qardu was appointed metropolitan of ʿIlam by the patriarch Yohannan III immediately after his consecration on 15 July 893. He was present at the consecration of the patriarch Yohannan IV in 900.

The metropolitan Giwargis of Gondeshapur was one of three bishops who went into hiding in 961 in protest against the election of the patriarch Israel of Seleucia-Ctesiphon.

The metropolitan Hnanishoʿ of ʿIlam was present at the consecration of the patriarch Mari on 10 April 987.

The bishop Sabrishoʿ of Anbar was appointed metropolitan of ʿIlam during the reign of the patriarch Mari (987–99).

The metropolitan Emmanuel, formerly bishop of Beth Huzaye, was metropolitan of ʿIlam when Elijah of Nisibis completed his Chronography in 1018/19.

The metropolitan Stephen Abu ʿAmr, formerly archimandrite of the Monastery of Saint John of Dailam, was consecrated metropolitan of ʿIlam by the patriarch Sabrisho III shortly after his consecration in 1063/4.

The bishop Sabrishoʿ of Balad was consecrated metropolitan of ʿIlam at an unknown date during the reign of the patriarch ʿAbdishoʿ II (1074–90).

The metropolitan and natar kursya ʿAbdishoʿ of ʿIlam was present at the consecration of the patriarch Sabrishoʿ IV in 1222.

The metropolitan Eliya of ʿIlam was present as nāṭar kursyā (interim administrator) at the consecration of the patriarch Makkikha II in 1257. He was also present at the consecration of the patriarch Denha I in 1265.

The metropolitan Maranʿemmeh of ʿIlam was present at the consecration of the patriarch Yahballaha III in 1281.

The metropolitan Joseph of ʿIlam was present at the consecration of the patriarch Timothy II in 1318.

== The Diocese of Karka d'Ledan ==
The Diocese of Karka d'Ledan was one of the four dioceses assigned to the metropolitan province of Beth Huzaye in Canon XXI of the synod of Isaac in 410. The bishops of the other three dioceses were confirmed as suffragans of the metropolitan of Beth Huzaye, but the status of the bishop of Karka d'Ledan (if there was one in 410) was not mentioned.

The bishop Sawma of Karka d'Ledan was among the signatories of the acts of the synod of Yahballaha I in 420.

The bishop Samuel of Karka d'Ledan was among the signatories of the acts of the synod of Babaï in 497.

The bishop Shalmai of Karka d'Ledan was among the bishops who rallied to the patriarch Mar Aba I in 540 and signed his Pragmatic.

The bishop Surin of Karka d'Ledan adhered by letter to the acts of the synod of Joseph in 554.

The bishop Mushe of Karka d'Ledan was among the signatories of the acts of the synod of Ezekiel in 576.

The bishop Pusaï of Karka d'Ledan was among the signatories of the acts of the synod of Gregory in 605.

== The Diocese of Hormizd Ardashir (Suq-al-Ahwaz) ==
The bishop Yohannan of Hormizd Ardashir was confirmed as a suffragan bishop of the metropolitan of Beth Huzaye in Canon XXI of the synod of Seleucid-Ctesiphon in 410.

The bishop Bataï of Hormizd Ardashir was one of eleven named bishops listed in the acts of the synod of Dadishoʿ in 424 as having been reproved at the synods of Seleucid-Ctesiphon in 410 and Yahballaha I in 420.

The bishop Bataï of Hormizd Ardashir, presumably a different man, was among the signatories of the acts of the synod of Acacius in 486.

The priests Abraham, Maraï, Shemʿon and Adurhormizd were among the signatories of the acts of the synod of Babaï in 497, on behalf of the bishop Shila of Hormizd Ardashir.

The bishop Buzaq (or Yozaq) of al-Ahwaz (Hormizd Ardashir) flourished in the 530s, during the schism of Narsaï and Elishaʿ.

Buzaq was succeeded as bishop of Hormizd Ardashir by his archdeacon, Paul. Paul later became metropolitan of Beth Huzaye, and was elected patriarch in 539.

The bishop Shila of Hormizd Ardashir, perhaps the same man, was among the bishops who rallied to the patriarch Mar Aba I in 540 and signed his Pragmatic. The patriarch visited Hormizd Ardashir and 'having made some urgent corrections there, restored the concord and peace of Christ there with the reconciliation of its inhabitants with their shepherd, the bishop and friend of God Mar Shila'. Shila was also among the signatories of the acts of the synod of Mar Aba I in 544, and adhered by letter to the acts of the synod of Joseph in 554.

Bishop David of Hormizd Ardashir was among the signatories of the acts of the synods of Ezekiel in 576 and Ishoyahb I in 585.

The bishop Pusaï of Hormizd Ardashir was among the signatories of the acts of the synod of Gregory in 605.

The bishop Theodore of Hormizd Ardashir was sent by the patriarch Ishoyahb III (649–59) on a mission to the refractory metropolitan Simeon of Rev Ardashir.

The bishop Shemʿon of 'Beth Huzaye' (Hormizd Ardashir) was present at the consecration of the patriarch Yohannan IV in 900.

The bishop Emmanuel, metropolitan of ʿIlam when Elijah of Nisibis completed his Chronography in 1018/19, was formerly bishop of 'Beth Huzaye' (Hormizd Ardashir).

== The Diocese of Shushter ==
The Diocese of Shushter (Syriac: Shushtra, ܫܘܫܛܪܐ) was recognised as a suffragan Diocese of the metropolitan of Beth Huzaye in Canon XXI of the synod of Isaac in 410.

The bishop Abraham of Shushter was one of several East Syriac bishops who opposed the claim to precedence put forward by the bishop Papa of Seleucia-Ctesiphon in 380.

The bishops ʿAbdishoʿ and Shemʿon Barduq of Shushter were among the signatories of the acts of the synod of Isaac in 410, and ʿAbdishoʿ was confirmed as a suffragan bishop of the metropolitan of Beth Huzaye in Canon XXI of the synod. Neither of these two bishops was present at the synod of Yahballaha I in 420, whose acts were subscribed to by the bishop Gura of Shushter. The bishop ʿAbdishoʿ was among the signatories of the acts of the synod of Dadishoʿ in 424, along with the bishop Miles of Shushter.

The bishop Pusaï of Shushter was among the signatories of the acts of the synod of Acacius in 486.

The bishop Yazdegerd of Shushter was among the signatories of the acts of the synod of Babaï in 497.

The bishop Elishaʿ of Shushter was among the bishops who rallied to the patriarch Mar Aba I in 540 and signed his Pragmatic. He was also among the signatories of the acts of the synod of Mar Aba I in 544, and adhered by letter to the acts of the synod of Joseph in 554.

The bishop Daniel of Shushter was among the signatories of the acts of the synod of Ezekiel in 576.

The bishop Stephen of Shushter was among the signatories of the acts of the synod of Ishoʿyahb I in 585.

The bishop Ahishma of Shushter was among the signatories of the acts of the synod of Gregory in 605.

The bishop Shlemun of Shushter was present at the consecration of the patriarch Yohannan IV in 900.

== The Diocese of Susa ==
The Diocese of Susa (Syriac: Shush, ܫܘܫ) may have been founded in the third century or earlier.

The bishop Milas al-Razi of Susa was one of several East Syriac bishops who opposed the claim to precedence put forward by the bishop Papa of Seleucia-Ctesiphon in 315. The bishop Miles of Susa, perhaps the same man, was martyred c.340 in the persecution of Shapur II.

The bishop 'Zuqa' of Susa was confirmed as a suffragan bishop of the metropolitan of Beth Huzaye in Canon XXI of the synod of Isaac in 410, and was among the signatories of the synod's acts. The bishop 'Duqa' of Susa, doubtless the same man, was among the signatories of the acts of the synod of Yahballaha I in 420.

The bishop Bar Shabtha of Susa was one of eleven named bishops listed in the acts of the synod of Dadishoʿ in 424 as having been reproved at the synods of Isaac in 410 and Yahballaha I in 420.

The bishop Papaï of Susa adhered by letter to the acts of the synod of Babaï in 497.

The bishop Khosro of Susa was among the bishops who rallied to the patriarch Mar Aba I in 540 and signed his Pragmatic. He also adhered by letter to the acts of the synod of Joseph in 554.

The bishop Adurhormizd of Susa was among the signatories of the acts of the synods of Ezekiel in 576 and Ishoʿyahb I in 585.

The bishop Yaʿqob of Susa was among the signatories of the acts of the synod of Gregory in 605.

The bishop Bar Sauma of Susa reproached the patriarch Ishoʿyahb II (628–45) for compromising the Nestorian christology of the Church of the East during an embassy to the Roman empire in 628, in which he was admitted to communion by the Roman bishops.

The monk Ishoʿ Maran-zkha of the monastery of Beth ʿAbe was elected bishop of Susa at an unknown date in the second half of the eighth century or the first half of the ninth century.

The bishop Ishoʿyahb of Susa was appointed metropolitan of Hulwan by the patriarch Yohannan III immediately after his consecration on 15 July 893.

The bishop Macarius of Susa was present at the consecration of the patriarch Yohannan IV in 900.

The bishop Yahballaha of Susa was present at the consecration of the patriarch Makkikha II in 1257.

The bishop Yohannan of Susa was present at the consecration of the patriarch Yahballaha III in 1281.

== The Diocese of Ispahan ==
The bishop Aphrahat of Ispahan was among the signatories of the acts of the synod of Dadishoʿ in 424.

The bishop Abraham 'of Beth Mihraqaye and Ispahan' was among the signatories of the acts of the synod of Babaï in 497.

The bishop Abraham of Ispahan was among the signatories of the acts of the synod of Joseph in 554.

The bishop Ahron of Ispahan was among the signatories of the acts of the synod of Ezekiel in 576.

In 794/5 the patriarch Timothy I replaced the bishop Abraham of 'Gai' (the name of the old town of Ispahan), who had attempted to seize the neighbouring Diocese of Shushter, with the bishop Adorshabur.

The bishop ʿAbdishoʿ of Ispahan was appointed metropolitan of Merv during the reign of the patriarch Mari (987–99).

The bishop ʿAbdishoʿ of Ispahan was present at the consecration of the patriarch Eliya II in 1111.

== The Diocese of Mihraganqadaq ==
The bishop Papa of Mihraganqadaq was among the signatories of the acts of the synod of Ezekiel in 576.

== The Diocese of Ram Hormizd ==
The bishop Shemʿon 'of Nisibis', abusively consecrated for 'Shurag, Ram Hormizd and other places' during the schism of Narsaï andElishaʿ in the early years of the sixth century, was deposed by the patriarch Mar Aba I in 540, but was allowed to continue as a priest in Shushter under the supervision of its bishop Elishaʿ.

The bishop Mihrshabur of Ram Hormizd was among the signatories of the acts of the synod of Ezekiel in 576.

The bishop Hnanishoʿ of Ram Hormizd was among the signatories of the acts of the synod of Ishoʿyahb I in 585.

== The Diocese of Shahpur Khwast ==
The East Syriac author ʿAbdishoʿ of Nisibis, writing around the end of the thirteenth century, mentions the bishop Gabriel of Shahpur Khwast (modern Hurremabad), who perhaps flourished during the tenth century. From its geographical location, Shahpur Khwast might have been a diocese in the province of ʿIlam, but it is not mentioned in any other source.
