= Psalter Pahlavi (Unicode block) =

- Range: U+10B80..U+10BAF (48 code points)
- Plane: SMP
- Scripts: Psalter Pahlavi
- Major alphabets: Psalter Pahlavi
- Assigned: 29 code points
- Unused: 19 reserved code points

Unicode version history
- 7.0 (2014): 29 (+29)

Unicode documentation
- Code chart ∣ Web page

Psalter Pahlavi is a Unicode block containing characters for writing Middle Persian. The script derives its name from the "Pahlavi Psalter", a 6th- or 7th-century translation of a Syriac book of psalms.

Psalter Pahlavi^{[1]}^{[2]} Official Unicode Consortium code chart (PDF)
	0	1	2	3	4	5	6	7	8	9	A	B	C	D	E	F
U+10B8x	𐮀	𐮁	𐮂	𐮃	𐮄	𐮅	𐮆	𐮇	𐮈	𐮉	𐮊	𐮋	𐮌	𐮍	𐮎	𐮏
U+10B9x	𐮐	𐮑								𐮙	𐮚	𐮛	𐮜			
U+10BAx										𐮩	𐮪	𐮫	𐮬	𐮭	𐮮	𐮯
Notes: 1. As of Unicode version 16.0; 2. Grey areas indicate non-assigned code points

== History ==
The following Unicode-related documents record the purpose and process of defining specific characters in the Psalter Pahlavi block:

Version	Final code points (Note: Proposed code points and characters names may differ from final code points and names)	Count	L2 ID	WG2 ID	Document
7.0	U+10B80..10B91, 10B99..10B9C, 10BA9..10BAF	29	L2/00-128		Bunz, Carl-Martin (2000-03-01), Scripts from the Past in Future Versions of Unicode
7.0	U+10B80..10B91, 10B99..10B9C, 10BA9..10BAF	29	L2/01-007		Bunz, Carl-Martin (2000-12-21), "Pahlavi (Book-Pahlavi)", Iranianist Meeting Report: Symposium on Encoding Iranian Scripts in Unicode
7.0	U+10B80..10B91, 10B99..10B9C, 10BA9..10BAF	29	L2/02-450		Gippert, Jost (2002-11-29), 3rd Iranian Unicode Conference: Conference material (29-11-2002)
7.0	U+10B80..10B91, 10B99..10B9C, 10BA9..10BAF	29	L2/02-449	N2556	Everson, Michael (2002-12-04), Revised proposal to encode the Avestan and Pahlavi script in the UCS
7.0	U+10B80..10B91, 10B99..10B9C, 10BA9..10BAF	29	L2/07-102	N3241	Everson, Michael (2007-04-12), Proposal for encoding the Parthian, Inscriptional Pahlavi, and Psalter Pahlavi scripts in the BMP of the UCS
7.0	U+10B80..10B91, 10B99..10B9C, 10BA9..10BAF	29		N3353 (pdf, doc)	Umamaheswaran, V. S. (2007-10-10), "M51.25", Unconfirmed minutes of WG 2 meeting 51 Hanzhou, China; 2007-04-24/27
7.0	U+10B80..10B91, 10B99..10B9C, 10BA9..10BAF	29	L2/07-268	N3253 (pdf, doc)	Umamaheswaran, V. S. (2007-07-26), "8.17", Unconfirmed minutes of WG 2 meeting 50, Frankfurt-am-Main, Germany; 2007-04-24/27
7.0	U+10B80..10B91, 10B99..10B9C, 10BA9..10BAF	29	L2/07-225		Moore, Lisa (2007-08-21), "C.8", UTC #112 Minutes
7.0	U+10B80..10B91, 10B99..10B9C, 10BA9..10BAF	29	L2/07-207R	N3286R	Everson, Michael; Pournader, Roozbeh (2007-08-24), Proposal for encoding the Inscriptional Parthian, Inscriptional Pahlavi, and Psalter Pahlavi scripts in the SMP of the UCS
7.0	U+10B80..10B91, 10B99..10B9C, 10BA9..10BAF	29	L2/11-147	N4040	Everson, Michael; Pournader, Roozbeh (2011-05-06), Proposal for encoding the Psalter Pahlavi script in the SMP of the UCS
7.0	U+10B80..10B91, 10B99..10B9C, 10BA9..10BAF	29	L2/11-261R2		Moore, Lisa (2011-08-16), "C.3", UTC #128 / L2 #225 Minutes
7.0	U+10B80..10B91, 10B99..10B9C, 10BA9..10BAF	29	L2/11-330	N4181	Anderson, Deborah (2011-11-04), Proposed Additions to ISO/IEC 10646
7.0	U+10B80..10B91, 10B99..10B9C, 10BA9..10BAF	29		N4253 (pdf, doc)	"M59.07", Unconfirmed minutes of WG 2 meeting 59, 2012-09-12
