= Narsai of Seleucia-Ctesiphon =

Narsai was Patriarch of the Church of the East during a period of schism from 524 to 537. Unlike his opponent Elishaʿ, who is included in the traditional list of patriarchs of the Church of the East, Narsai, has traditionally been considered an anti-patriarch.

== Sources ==
Brief accounts of Narsai's reign are given in the Ecclesiastical Chronicle of the Jacobite writer Bar Hebraeus (floruit 1280) and in the ecclesiastical histories of the Nestorian writers Mari (twelfth-century), ʿAmr (fourteenth-century) and Sliba (fourteenth-century). A long and detailed account of the schism of Narsai and Elishaʿ is given in the Chronicle of Seert.

== Narsai's patriarchate ==
The following account of Narsai's reign is given by Bar Hebraeus:

Shila died after a while in office. Then a schism arose among the bishops. Some of them supported Elishaʿ, the son-in-law of Shila, and consecrated him catholicus in the church of Ctesiphon; while others supported a man called Narsaï, and consecrated him catholicus in the great church of Seleucia. Each of them began to appoint bishops for the vacant churches, and ultimately Elishaʿ prevailed with the support of the king and shut up Narsaï in a prison. Narsaï died shortly afterwards, and Elishaʿ began to hope that he would be firmly established in the leadership; but the bishops assembled together and degraded him from his rank.

== See also ==
- List of patriarchs of the Church of the East

== Notes ==
Preceded by Shila (503–23)	Catholicus-Patriarch of the East (524–37)	Succeeded by Paul (539)
