= Dadisho =

- Catholicos-Patriarch of Seleucia-Ctesiphon
- Installed: 421
- Term ended: 456
- Predecessor: Farbokht
- Successor: Babowai

Personal details
- Denomination: Church of the East

Mar Dadishoʿ was the Catholicos of the East from 421 AD to 456 AD. During his reign as Catholicos, in 424 AD, the Church of the East declared itself independent of all other churches, resulting in Mar Dadishoʿtaking the title of Patriarch, becoming the first Catholicos-Patriarch of Seleucia-Ctesiphon.

== Sources ==
- Baum, Wilhelm; Winkler, Dietmar W. (2003). The Church of the East: A Concise History. London-New York: Routledge-Curzon. ISBN 9781134430192.
- Chabot, Jean-Baptiste (1902). Synodicon orientale ou recueil de synodes nestoriens (PDF). Paris: Imprimerie Nationale.
- Meyendorff, John (1989). Imperial unity and Christian divisions: The Church 450-680 A.D. The Church in history. Vol. 2. Crestwood, NY: St. Vladimir's Seminary Press. ISBN 9780881410563.
- Wigram, William Ainger (1910). An Introduction to the History of the Assyrian Church or The Church of the Sassanid Persian Empire 100-640 A.D. London: Society for Promoting Christian Knowledge. ISBN 9780837080789.

Church of the East titles
Preceded by Farbokht (421)	Catholicos-Patriarch of the East (421–456)	Succeeded by Babowai (457–484)
