= Ishoʿbokht =

Persian legal scholar and Christian theologian

Ishoʿbokht (late 7th or late 8th century) was a Persian legal scholar, Christian theologian and philosopher. He is known through his writings and a few references to them. The dates of his birth and death are not known precisely, and little can be said of his life other than that he served as the metropolitan bishop of Fars.

== Theologian ==
Ishoʿbokht was a member of the Church of the East. His native language was almost certainly Persian and he may have been a native of Rev Ardashir, the seat of the metropolitans of Fars. According to the 14th-century catalogue of the church's writers drawn up by ʿAbdishoʿ bar Brikha, he wrote three works: a book called On This Universe, (Note: Syriac: ʿAl hānā kull) a book of law and a treatise on shūdāʿ aʾeras, i.e., the meaning of the winds. Although only the book of law survives, the first work is cited as a source in the Book of Examples and Their Study, (Note: Arabic: Kitāb al-ʿIbar wa-l-iʿtibār) a 9th-century Islamic treatise on the teleological argument, which is ascribed to al-Jāḥiẓ. On This Universe is described as written in Persian by Ishoʿbokht, metropolitan of Fars under the Umayyads (that is, before 750).

There is an excerpt attributed to Ishoʿbokht that appears to be drawn from a treatise on the six days of Creation. It is in Syriac, although that may not have been its original language.

== Jurist ==
Ishoʿbokht's legal treatise was originally composed in Persian, but today survives only in translation. The only direct translation is a Syriac one entitled Maktbānūtā d-ʿal dīnē, (Note: Hoyland 1997, p. 206, translates it Composition on the Laws, while Jamali 2017, p. 47, goes with Writing on Judgement.) often called the Corpus Juris. This translation was commissioned by Patriarch Timothy I (780–823). According to the translator's preface, Ishoʿbokht was consecrated as metropolitan of Fars by a patriarch named Ḥenanishoʿ, which could be either Ḥenanishoʿ I (685/686–699/700) or Ḥenanishoʿ II (772/773–779/780). The latter is generally considered more likely, although it necessitates placing his theological work (written while the Umayyads were in power) more than two decades before his consecration. The translation was most likely made only after Ishoʿbokht was dead. It is preserved in the manuscript Alqosh Syr. 169, which also contains the Synodicon Orientale. There exists an Arabic translation from the Syriac.

The Corpus Juris is divided into six books and 82 chapters. The first book is theoretical in nature. The second and third books concern marriage and divorce. The fourth is about inheritance and the fifth donations and testaments. The sixth book deals with appeals. The first five books contain substantive law, but the last is the first major work on procedural law to come out of the Church of the East. Isho'bokht proposes substantial developments of the procedure followed by the ecclesiastical courts, and promotes in particular the use of oaths.

Among Ishoʿbokht's sources are the Bible, Roman law, Persian law and to a lesser extent Islamic law. He is familiar with the Sasanian Book of a Thousand Judgments (Note: Persian Mādīgān ī hazār dādestān) and his work has been used by scholars seeking to reconstruct Sasanian law. Eduard Sachau argues that because the legal works of Shemʿon, another metropolitan of Fars of uncertain date, make little use of Sasanian law, Ishoʿbokht's pontificate must be placed earlier than Shemʿon's.

In his introduction, Ishoʿbokht writes that he will take ideas from his own church's traditions as well as those of other churches and his own reasoning. His stated reason for writing is that the laws of the Christians are not uniform, in contrast to Islamic law, Jewish law and Zoroastrian law:

While the Jews in every place have one law, as also the error of the Magians (Note: i.e., Zoroastrians) and likewise also those who now rule over us, (Note: i.e., Muslims) among the Christians the laws which are determined in the land of the Romans (Note: i.e., the Byzantine Empire) are distinct from those in the land of the Persians, and they in turn are distinct from those in the land of the Arameans, and different from Ahwaz, and different in Mayshan, (Note: i.e., the ecclesiastical provinces of Beth Aramaye, Beth Huzaye and Maishan) and likewise also in other places. Thus also from district to district and from city to city there are many differences in the matters of laws. And though the religion of the Christians is one, the law is not one ...

Ishoʿbokht is considered an original mind and one of the most important jurists the Church of the East produced. He was an important source for later jurists.

== Philosopher ==
Besides the three works known to ʿAbdishoʿ, there are other works by Ishoʿbokht that are partially preserved and attest his philosophical interests. Extracts from his commentary on the Categories of Aristotle exist in two manuscripts. There is also a note on possibilities. It is not absolutely certain that these fragments are by the Ishoʿbokht who was metropolitan of Fars. They survive only in Syriac, although that may not be their original language.

== Bibliography ==
- Aoun, Marc (2005). "Jésubokt, métropolitain et juriste de l'Église d'Orient (Nestorienne), auteur au VIII^{e} siècle du premier traité systématique de droit séculier". Tijdschrift voor Rechtsgeschiedenis. 73 (1): 81–92. doi:10.1163/1571819054088599.
- Hoyland, Robert G. (1997). Seeing Islam as Others Saw It: A Survey and Evaluation of Christian, Jewish and Zoroastrian Writings on Early Islam. Darwin Press.
- Jamali, Nima (2017). "Book VI of Īšōʿ-bokht's Corpus Juris and the Emergence of Procedural Laws in the Church of the East". Journal of the Canadian Society for Syriac Studies. 17 (1): 37–48. doi:10.31826/9781463238940-004.
- Jany, Janos (2020). Legal Traditions in Asia: History, Concepts and Laws. Springer.
- Van Rompay, Lucas (2011). "Ishoʿbokht of Rev Ardashir". In Sebastian P. Brock; Aaron M. Butts; George A. Kiraz; Lucas Van Rompay (eds.). Gorgias Encyclopedic Dictionary of the Syriac Heritage. Gorgias Press.
