= Acacius of Seleucia-Ctesiphon =

- Catholicos-Patriarch of Seleucia-Ctesiphon
- Installed: 485
- Term ended: 496
- Predecessor: Babowai
- Successor: Babai

Personal details
- Denomination: Church of the East

Acacius was Catholicos of Seleucia-Ctesiphon and Patriarch of the Church of the East from 485 to 496. His tenure was marked by internal christological and ecclesiological disputes. He struggled to prevent the Church of the East from aligning itself with the 'Nestorian' doctrine espoused by the metropolitan Barsauma of Nisibis. He is included in the traditional list of patriarchs of the Church of the East.

== Historical sources ==
Brief accounts of Acacius's reign are given in the Ecclesiastical Chronicle of the Jacobite writer Bar Hebraeus (floruit 1280) and in the ecclesiastical histories of the Nestorian writers Mari (twelfth-century), ʿAmr (fourteenth-century) and Sliba (fourteenth-century). His life is also covered in the Chronicle of Seert.

== Acacius's patriarchate ==
Acacius played a key role in the events that led to the takeover of the Church of the East by the Nestorians in the last two decades of the fifth century. A moderate churchman, he was appointed patriarch in 485 by the political enemies of the powerful metropolitan Barsauma of Nisibis, a champion of Nestorianism, in the hope that he would prevent the takeover of the Church of the East by the Nestorians. But despite frequent quarrels with Barsauma, Acacius was unable to prevent the victory of the powerful Nestorian faction. Synods held in Beth Edrai (485) and Seleucia-Ctesiphon (486) entrenched Nestorian christology within the Church of the East.

The following account of Acacius's reign [with some minor omissions] is given by Bar Hebraeus, who as a Jacobite author was prejudiced against the Nestorians. In the first sentence Barsauma (the name means 'son of fasting') is derisively nicknamed 'Bar Sula', 'son of the shoe'.

Then the bishops who had fled from Bar Sula met at Seleucia, and consecrated a certain Acacius as their catholicus. When Barsauma of Nisibis and Magna of Fars heard of this, they threatened to kill Acacius like his predecessor unless he accepted their words. And he, terrified, gave in to them, chiefly on account of the old affection that he still felt for them; for he had been a fellow-student of Barsauma, Magna and Narsaï in the school of Edessa, and had fled from there with them; and so he did not oppose their plans. He also convened a synod in which he confirmed the faith of Nestorius. From that time Nestorianism held sway throughout the East, and fornication became so common among the bishops, the priests, the deacons and the people that Christian babies lay on the rubbish tips and in the streets, and many of them were eaten by dogs, so that Acacius was forced to build houses to accommodate the orphans and to feed the women so that they might bring up the offspring of their lust. In this way, under tragic auspices, the Nestorian faith was established in the East.

At that time Acacius was sent by the king of the Persians as an ambassador to the emperor of the Greeks, and the western bishops met with him. He was asked about the Nestorian heresy, but denied any knowledge of either Nestorius or his heresy, and said that this was just a shameful name given to them by their enemy Aksenaya. On his return to the East, Acacius found that Barsauma had already died. Some say that the monks of Tur ʿAbdin mobbed him in the church and killed him with the keys of their cells, while others say that his tomb can be seen in the church of Mar Yaʿqob in Nisibis.

During Acacius' catholicosate, the Persian king Kavad I ordered all the religious communities in Persia to submit written descriptions of their beliefs. Acacius commissioned Elishaʿ bar Quzbaye, interpreter of the school of Nisibis, to write it in Syriac. The catholicos then had it translated into Persian and presented to Kavad. This must have taken place between 488 (Kavad's accession) and 496 (Aqaq's death).

== See also ==
- List of patriarchs of the Church of the East

== Sources ==
- Abbeloos, J. B., and Lamy, T. J., Bar Hebraeus, Chronicon Ecclesiasticum (3 vols, Paris, 1877)
- Assemani, Giuseppe Luigi (1775). De catholicis seu patriarchis Chaldaeorum et Nestorianorum commentarius historico-chronologicus. Roma.
- Becker, Adam H. (2006). Fear of God and the Beginning of Wisdom: The School of Nisibis and the Development of Scholastic Culture in Late Antique Mesopotamia. University of Pennsylvania Press.
- Baum, Wilhelm; Winkler, Dietmar W. (2003). The Church of the East: A Concise History. London-New York: Routledge-Curzon. ISBN 978-1-134-43019-2.
- Brooks, E. W., Eliae Metropolitae Nisibeni Opus Chronologicum (Rome, 1910)
- Chabot, Jean-Baptiste (1902). Synodicon orientale ou recueil de synodes nestoriens (PDF). Paris: Imprimerie Nationale.
- Gismondi, H., Maris, Amri, et Salibae: De Patriarchis Nestorianorum Commentaria I: Amri et Salibae Textus (Rome, 1896)
- Gismondi, H., Maris, Amri, et Salibae: De Patriarchis Nestorianorum Commentaria II: Maris textus arabicus et versio Latina (Rome, 1899)
- Meyendorff, John (1989). Imperial unity and Christian divisions: The Church 450-680 A.D. The Church in history. Vol. 2. Crestwood, NY: St. Vladimir's Seminary Press. ISBN 978-0-88141-056-3.
- Wigram, William Ainger (1910). An Introduction to the History of the Assyrian Church or The Church of the Sassanid Persian Empire 100-640 A.D. London: Society for Promoting Christian Knowledge. ISBN 978-0-8370-8078-9.
- Võõbus, Arthur (1965). History of the School of Nisibis. Secrétariat du Corpus Scriptorum Christianorum Orientalium.

Church of the East titles
Preceded by Babowai (457–484)	Catholicos-Patriarch of the East (485–496)	Succeeded by Babai (497–503)
