= Psalter Pahlavi =

Abjad which was used for writing Middle Persian on paper

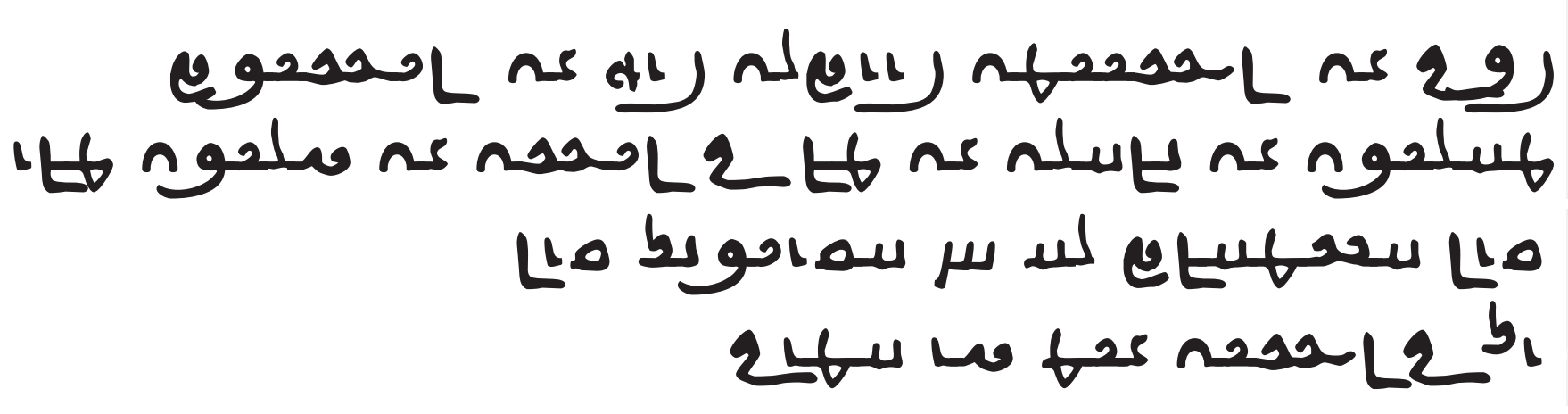
- Sample of text taken from the Cross of Herat
- Script type: Abjad
- Period: Mid-6th to 7th century CE
- Direction: Right-to-left script
- Languages: Middle Persian

Related scripts
- Parent systems: Aramaic alphabet: Pahlavi scripts; Psalter Pahlavi

ISO 15924
- ISO 15924: Phlp (132), Psalter Pahlavi

Unicode
- Unicode alias: Psalter Pahlavi
- Unicode range: U+10B80–U+10BAF

Psalter Pahlavi is a cursive abjad that was used for writing Middle Persian on paper. It is described as one of the Pahlavi scripts. It was written from right to left, and usually with spaces between words.

It takes its name from the Pahlavi Psalter, part of the Psalms translated from Syriac to Middle Persian and found in what is now western China.

== Letters ==
Letters (Isolated Form)
Name (Note: The names are based on the corresponding Imperial Aramaic characters.)	Image	Text	IPA
Aleph		𐮀	/a/, /aː/
Beth		𐮁	/b/, /w/
Gimel		𐮂	/g/, /j/
Daleth		𐮃	/d/, /j/
He		𐮄	/h/
Waw-Ayin-Resh		𐮅	/w/, /r/
Zayin		𐮆	/z/
Heth		𐮇	/h/, /x/
Yodh		𐮈	/j/, /ē̆/, /ī̆/, /d͡ʒ/
Kaph		𐮉	/k/, /g/
Lamedh		𐮊	/l/, /r/
Mem-Qoph		𐮋	/m/, /q/
Nun		𐮌	/n/
Samekh		𐮍	/s/, /h/
Pe		𐮎	/p/, /b/, /f/
Sadhe		𐮏	/t͡ʃ/, /d͡ʒ/, /z/
Shin		𐮐	/ʃ/
Taw		𐮑	/t/, /d/

== Punctuation ==
Four different large section-ending punctuation marks were used:

Mark		Description
Image	Text	Description
	𐮙	Section mark
	𐮚	Turned section mark
	𐮛	Four dots with cross
	𐮜	Four dots with dot

== Numbers ==
Psalter Pahlavi had its own numerals:

Value		1	2	3	4	10	20	100
Sign	Image							
Sign	Text	𐮩	𐮪	𐮫	𐮬	𐮭	𐮮	𐮯

Some numerals have joining behavior—with both numerals and letters—displayed by the use of written numbers in numerals. Numerals are written right-to-left, the rightmost being the highest—with the exception of multiplication. Numerals add when the one to the left is lower or equal, but multiply when it is larger. There is, in all but one of the numerals, above 100—in the Unicode document—the letter Waw (𐮅) meaning ‘and’ between 100 and the smaller numeral.

Example: 135 is written as 𐮯 𐮅 𐮮𐮭𐮫𐮪 (100 and 20 + 10 + 3 + 2).

== Unicode block ==
Psalter Pahlavi script was added to the Unicode Standard in June, 2014 with the release of version 7.0.

The Unicode block is U+10B80–U+10BAF:

Psalter Pahlavi^{[1]}^{[2]} Official Unicode Consortium code chart (PDF)
	0	1	2	3	4	5	6	7	8	9	A	B	C	D	E	F
U+10B8x	𐮀	𐮁	𐮂	𐮃	𐮄	𐮅	𐮆	𐮇	𐮈	𐮉	𐮊	𐮋	𐮌	𐮍	𐮎	𐮏
U+10B9x	𐮐	𐮑								𐮙	𐮚	𐮛	𐮜			
U+10BAx										𐮩	𐮪	𐮫	𐮬	𐮭	𐮮	𐮯
Notes 1.As of Unicode version 18.0 2.Grey areas indicate non-assigned code points
