= Babowai =

Patriarch of the Church of the East from 457 to 484

- Catholicos-Patriarch of Seleucia-Ctesiphon
- Installed: 457
- Term ended: 484
- Predecessor: Dadisho
- Successor: Acacius

Personal details
- Denomination: Church of the East

Babowai (also Babaeus or Mar Babwahi) (died 484) was Catholicos of Seleucia-Ctesiphon and Patriarch of the Church of the East from 457 to 484, during the reign of the Sassanid King Peroz I. Babowai was known for his pro-Byzantine leanings, for which he was often in conflict with other members of the anti-Byzantine Church of the East. He was executed in 484.

Babowai was known as a learned philosopher. He was also a convert from Magianism, what the Zorastrians would call an apostate, someone who had renounced their religion, and therefore subject to considerable persecution by the Sassanid state. He was imprisoned for seven years, probably 470–480, and tortured repeatedly by the Magi, who were also burning churches and imprisoning other Christians. Babowai was also often in conflict with Barsauma, the metropolitan of Nisibis, though this was not unusual as Babowai was known to be in conflict with many others as well, be they authorities, colleagues, or subordinates. He was known to discipline bishops in his church, and whether right or wrong, some of these bishops would flee to Barsauma for his support.

The root of the conflict with Barsauma may have been due to a major issue at the time, that of whether members of the clergy should be celibate or not. When Babowai wrote a letter to some Roman bishops, asking them to use their influence with the emperor, and procure his intercession with the Shah-in-Shah (King Peroz) to avert persecution, Barsauma somehow managed to intercept the message, even though it had been hidden in the hollow of a cane. Within the letter, Babowai had used some imprudent language such as, "God has given us over to an accursed kingdom." Barsauma took advantage of this, and showed the letter to King Peroz, who was understandably furious. Peroz confronted Babowai, who admitted to the letter, and Peroz sentenced Babowai to death. For this, he is regarded by some as a martyr.

== School ==
Babowai founded a catechetical school at Seleucia, of which his successor Mar Acacius was the first head. Mar Aba undertook substantial remodeling, and gave the school a library. When the Patriarchate was transferred to Baghdad in the 9th century, the school followed it.

== Sources ==
- Baum, Wilhelm; Winkler, Dietmar W. (2003). The Church of the East: A Concise History. London-New York: Routledge-Curzon. ISBN 9781134430192.
- Meyendorff, John (1989). Imperial unity and Christian divisions: The Church 450-680 A.D. The Church in history. Vol. 2. Crestwood, NY: St. Vladimir's Seminary Press. ISBN 9780881410563.
- Wigram, William Ainger (1910). An Introduction to the History of the Assyrian Church or The Church of the Sassanid Persian Empire 100-640 A.D. London: Society for Promoting Christian Knowledge. ISBN 9780837080789.

Church of the East titles
Preceded by Dadisho (421–456)	Catholicos-Patriarch of the East (457–484)	Succeeded by Acacius (485–496)
