= Pahlavi Psalter =

Middle-Persian translation of a Syriac version of the Book of Psalms

The Pahlavi Psalter is the name given to a 12-page non-contiguous section of a Middle Persian translation of a Syriac version of the Book of Psalms.

The Pahlavi Psalter was discovered in 1905 by the second German Turpan expedition under Albert von Le Coq. Together with a mass of other fragmentary Christian manuscripts discovered in the ruins of the library of Shui-pang at Bulayïq (near Turpan, in what is today the Xinjiang Uyghur Autonomous Region of China), the documents were sent to Berlin for analysis, where the fragments remain today.

The Pahlavi Psalter is the oldest surviving example of Pahlavi literature, that is, literature composed using the Pahlavi writing system. Ma'na, a 6th-century East Syriac metropolitan of Pars and a noted Pahlavi writer, is generally attributed with the translation of the Psalter into Pahlavi. The surviving fragments probably date to the 6th or 7th century CE. The translation itself dates to not before the mid-6th century since it reflects liturgical additions to the Syriac original by Mar Aba I, who was Patriarch of the Church of the East c. 540–552.

The script of the psalter, like that of all other examples of Pahlavi literature, is also an Aramaic-derived script (see Pahlavi for details). However, unlike Book Pahlavi script, which is a later but more common form of the consonantary and has 12 or 13 graphemes, the script of the psalms has 5 symbols more. The variant of the script used for the psalter was for almost a century the only evidence of that specific variant, which consequently came to be referred to as Psalter Pahlavi script. More recently however, another sample of the writing was discovered in the inscriptions on a bronze processional cross found at Herat (in present-day Afghanistan). Due to the dearth of comparable material, some words and phrases in both sources remain undeciphered.

== See also ==
- Iranians in China
