= Yaqob of India =

14th-century Indian bishop

Mar Yaqob of India
- Malabar Church of St Thomas Christians.
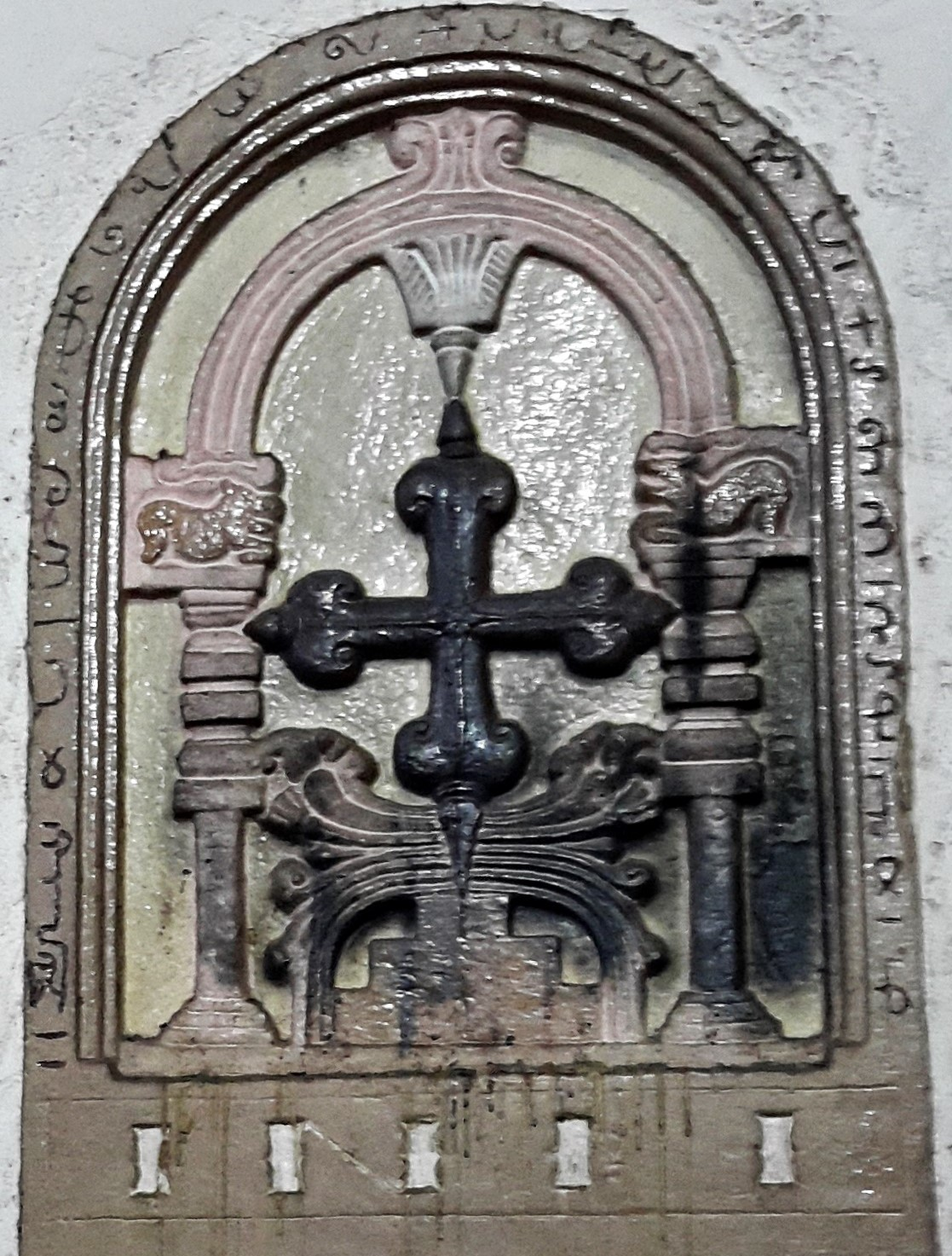
- Diocese: kodungallur
- Installed: ?
- Term ended: 1330
- Successor: Mar Yohannan (next known; 1490-1503)

Orders
- Ordination: by Yahballaha III (1245–1317)

Personal details
- Died: unknown Cranganore?
- Buried: ?

Yaqob of India, also known as Mar Jacob, was a metropolitan bishop of the St Thomas Christians of Malabar. The history and legends of the East Syriac prelates in India prior to the arrival of European explorers are shrouded in mystery because of the unavailability of surviving documents. The Vatican Syrian codex 22, the oldest surviving Syrian manuscript written in Malabar, specifically mentions an East Syriac bishop who was residing in Malabar at that time. According to this ancient document, (now in the Vatican Library), which was written by a Deacon named Zachariah bar Joseph address Mar Jacob as Metropolitan of Indian.

== Patriarch Yahballaha III and the Metropolitan Yaʿqob of India. ==
The dating formula in the colophon to a manuscript copied in June 1301 in the church of Mar Quriaqos in Cranganoor mentions the patriarch Yahballaha III (whom it curiously describes as Yahballaha V), and the metropolitan Yaʿqob of India (described as 'vicar and governor of the seat of the apostle Thomas', and probably the bishop Yacqob mentioned as the scribe's tutor).. Cranganore, described in this manuscript as 'the royal city', was doubtless the metropolitan seat for India at this time. The scribe was the fourteen-year-old Deacon Zakarya, son of Joseph, son of Zakarya, who is described as 'the pupil of the bishop Yacqob'. The colophon of the manuscript suggests the ongoing relationship between the churches of Seleucia-Ctesiphon and Malabar and also the consciousness of St Thomas Christians about their apostolic origin. (One important aspect of the identity of the St. Thomas Christians was and continues to be their consciousness of their apostolic origin).

This holy book was written in the royal, renowned and famous city of Chingala (Cranganore) in Malabar in the time of the great captain and director of the holy catholic church of the East.. our blessed and holy Father Mar Yahd Alaha V and in the time of bishop Mar Jacob, Metropolitan and director of the holy see of the Apostle Mar Thoma, that is to say, our great captain and the director of the entire holy church of Christian India

The language used by the scribe about the patriarch Yahballaha III, however, is intriguing. The dating formula reads as follows:

When the great governor, the holder of the key of the Holy Apostolic Church of the East and the bright lamp illuminating its territories, the chief of the chief priests, the father of fathers, our blessed and holy father, was Mar Yahballaha the Fifth, the Turk, catholicos-patriarch of the East, the chief region of the world, which guides and illuminates the other regions; who stands above the Catholic Church like a lampstand to give light to all its servants and to dispel its fears.

It is interesting to see the superiority of the East over the West upheld in this formula, as three years later, in 1304, Yahballaha acknowledged the primacy of the Pope of Rome. Protestant and Catholic scholars have long disputed the significance of this acknowledgement, and it seems likely that Yahballaha's acknowledgement in 1304 meant little in practice. It made sense for Yahballaha to cultivate good relations with Rome, but the recognition by the Church of the East of the primacy of the See of Saint Peter did not, in the eyes of the East Syriacs, give the Western church the right to dictate their beliefs. The colophon of MS Vat Syr 22 is an interesting indication of how the East Syriacs really saw themselves at this period. But there is one puzzling aspect of this colophon. It is not surprising to find the Ongut patriarch Yahballaha III referred to as a 'Turk'. But it is surprising to find him referred to as 'Yahballaha the Fifth'. The standard lists of the Easy Syrian patriarchs know only two earlier patriarchs named Yahballaha, viz. Yahballaha I (415–20) and Yahballaha II (1190–1222). None of the known anti-patriarchs were named Yahballaha.

== Contact with Western missionaries ==
About the same time, unexpected circumstances briefly provided the Indian Church with Western contacts. Two of those visitors stand out as particularly important from the viewpoint of inter-Christian relations. The first was the Dominican Friar Jordan Catala of Sevcrar (died c. 1336), who, after the first stay in India, prompted Pope John XXII to establish the first Latin diocese in the subcontinent at Quilon. It was, however, a very short-lived attempt. The second was the Franciscan and papal envoy John de Marignolli, who stayed in Quilon for sixteen months in 1348-49.

Their reports, as well as those of other such casual visitors, help provide a clearer picture of Eastern Christianity in India in these centuries. In the 1320s, the anonymous biographer of the patriarch Yahballaha III and his friend Rabban Bar Sauma praised the achievement of the Church of the East in converting 'the Indians, Chinese and Turks'. India was listed as one of the Church of the East's 'provinces of the exterior' by the historian ʿAmr in 1348.

== See also ==
- List of patriarchs of the Church of the East
- Rabban Bar Sauma
- Nestorianism and the church in India

== Sources ==
- Baum, Wilhelm; Winkler, Dietmar W. (2003). The Church of the East: A Concise History. London-New York: Routledge-Curzon. ISBN 9781134430192.
- Vadakkekara, Benedict (2007). Origin of Christianity in India: A Historiographical Critique. Delhi: Media House. ISBN 9788174952585.
