= Niranam Grandhavari =

Malayalam history book

Niranam Grandhavari (Malayalam: നിരണം ഗ്രന്ഥവരി) is the first book of history in Malayalam. Writing this book began before 1773. The subject of Niranam Grandhavari is the history of Malankara Church.

== Etymology ==
The word Grandhavari in Malayalam means chronicle. At the time of the beginning of its writing, the primate of Malankara Church was Mar Thoma VI whose headquarters was Niranam Church. As it was primarily written at Niranam, this historical account came to be known as Niranam Grandhavari.

The manuscripts themselves do not have a name. The title 'Niranam Grandhavari' was coined by historian Edamaruku Joseph in his book Kerala Samskaram.

== Author ==
The authorship of Niranam Grandhavari remains a matter of speculation. Some believe that it was written by Mar Thoma VI himself. There was a legend that an uninterrupted chronicle was kept by the primates (Archdeacons) of Malankara Church until 1653, which Mar Thoma VI might have used as a reference. Niranam Grandhavari itself hints about such a Chronicle of the Archdeacons, saying that it was eaten by ants at Niranam Church. However, the probability that Mar Thoma VI was the author is very low, considering that it is mentioned in some chapters that the author is writing it as per the order of Mar Thoma Metran. In addition to this, the nature of the text indicates that it was written by persons closely associated with Mar Thoma Metrans.

== Manuscripts and Transcriptions ==
The oldest surviving palm-leaf manuscript (thaliyola) of Niranam Grandhavari comprises 179 palm leaves, with writing on both sides. The original is in the possession of Kanianthra family of Mepral. Another manuscript was kept by Karuthadathu family at Mavelikkara.

In addition to these manuscripts, several hand-written copies of this Chronicle are kept in the possession of multiple families and persons in Kerala.

Niranam Grandhavari was transcripted at Oriental Manuscript Library, Thiruvananthapuram in 1988. The transcribed version has 384 Foolscap folio pages.

== Content ==
The content of Kanianthra Manuscript can be classified as follows:

1. History of Jews till Jesus Christ
2. History of Christianity
  1. The history of Jesus Christ
  2. About twelve Apostles
  3. Universal Church history
3. Malankara Church history
  1. From AD 825 -1653
  2. From AD 1653 – 1728
  3. From AD 1728 – 1808
  4. From AD 1808 – 1829
4. Malankara Church history – II
  1. Legend of Mar Abo and Kadamattathu Kathanar
  2. Pakalomattom lineage
  3. Later bishops
5. Article about faith and heresies
6. Essays of Mar lvanios Hadiatallah.
  1. Catholic Church vs. Roman Church
  2. Leavened Vs. un- Leavened bread for Holy Eucharist
  3. Against idols
  4. Marriage of the priests
  5. Importance of right hand side
  6. The time of day-beginnings
7. Arrival of Saint Thomas and a legend about Kodungallor temple
8. Miscellaneous subjects
9. Identification of precious stones
10. Portion of a letter
11. Poems of Mar lvanios
