= Babai of Seleucia-Ctesiphon =

Patriarch of the Church of the East from 497 to 503

Mar Babai of Seleucia-Ctesiphon
- Catholicos-Patriarch of Seleucia-Ctesiphon
- Installed: 497
- Term ended: 503
- Predecessor: Acacius
- Successor: Shila

Personal details
- Denomination: Church of the East

Babai, also Babaeus, was Catholicos of Seleucia-Ctesiphon and Patriarch of the Church of the East from 497 to 503. Under his leadership, the Church in Sasanian Empire (Persia) became increasingly aligned with the Nestorian movement, declared heretical in the Roman Empire.

Babai was also known as patriarch of Seleucia-Ctesiphon. When he became patriarch, he was married. With the permission of King Djamasp, Babai was allowed to call a synod (council) in 497/499, at which clerical celibacy was abolished, permitting priests and even bishops to marry. Babai died during the reign of King Kobad, during a time while Kobad was at war with the Byzantine Empire.

== Sources ==
- Baum, Wilhelm; Winkler, Dietmar W. (2003). The Church of the East: A Concise History. London-New York: Routledge-Curzon.
- Chabot, Jean-Baptiste (1902). Synodicon orientale ou recueil de synodes nestoriens (PDF). Paris: Imprimerie Nationale.
- Till Engelmann, "Monastisch geprägter Theologe oder theologisch gebildeter Mönch? Das Zentrum der Theologie Babais des Großen," in Dmitrij Bumazhnov u. Hans R. Seeliger (hg.) Syrien im 1.-7. Jahrhundert nach Christus. Akten der 1. Tübinger Tagung zum Christlichen Orient (15.-16. Juni 2007) (Tübingen, Mohr Siebeck, 2011) (Studien und Texte zu Antike und Christentum / Studies and Texts in Antiquity and Christianity, 62),
- Meyendorff, John (1989). Imperial unity and Christian divisions: The Church 450-680 A.D. The Church in history. Vol. 2. Crestwood, NY: St. Vladimir's Seminary Press.
- Stewart, John (1961) [1928]. Nestorian missoniary enterprise: The story of a church on fire. India: Mar Narsai Press.
- Wigram, William Ainger (1910). An Introduction to the History of the Assyrian Church or The Church of the Sassanid Persian Empire 100-640 A.D. London: Society for Promoting Christian Knowledge.

Church of the East titles
Preceded by Acacius (485–496)	Catholicos-Patriarch of the East (497–503)	Succeeded by Shila (503–523)
