= Shila of Seleucia-Ctesiphon =

Shila was Patriarch of the Church of the East from 503 to 523. He is included in the traditional list of patriarchs of the Church of the East.

== Sources ==
Brief accounts of Shila's reign are given in the Ecclesiastical Chronicle of the Jacobite writer Bar Hebraeus (floruit 1280) and in the ecclesiastical histories of the Nestorian writers Mari (twelfth-century), ʿAmr (fourteenth-century) and Sliba (fourteenth-century). His life is also covered in the Chronicle of Seert.

Modern assessments of his patriarchate can be found in Wigram's Introduction to the History of the Assyrian Church and David Wilmshurst's The Martyred Church.

== Shila's patriarchate ==
The following account of Shila's reign is given by Bar Hebraeus:

Babai died after five years in office, and his successor was Shila, whose name is derived from the Hebrew word 'question'. This man had both a wife and sons and daughters, and he was a proud man besides, who loved luxuries and money and was under the thumb of his wife. He gave his daughter in marriage to a certain doctor named Elishaʿ, and ordered that his son-in-law Elishaʿ should be appointed catholicus after him; but the priest Mari opposed him. Shila died after a while in office.

== See also ==
- List of patriarchs of the Church of the East

== Notes ==
Church of the East titles
Preceded by Babai (497–502)	Catholicos-Patriarch of the East (502–523)	Succeeded by Elishaʿ (524–537)
