= Barsauma of Nisibis =

Bishop of the Church of the East from 460 to 491

bar Sawma
- Metropolitan of Nisibis
- Church: Church of the East
- Archdiocese: Nisibis
- Installed: 460
- Term ended: 491

Orders
- Rank: Metropolitan Bishop

Personal details
- Died: 491

Bar Sawma (Syriac: ܒܪ ܨܘܡܐ, romanized: Bar ṣawmā, lit. 'son of Lent'), was Metropolitan of Nisibis in the 5th century, and a major figure in the history of the Church of the East.

Bar Sawma had been a teacher and student at the School of Edessa, where his mentor had been Ibas, bishop of Edessa. Bar Sawma was excommunicated along with Ibas and other churchmen for their support of Nestorian teachings, which had been declared heretical at the Council of Ephesus in 431.

Though Ibas was acquitted of heresy at the Council of Chalcedon in 451, his associates were expelled from their positions once again after he died in 457. bar Sawma and other of Ibas' followers relocated to the Sasanian Empire.

Bar Sawma became metropolitan of Nisibis, one of the five great archdioceses of the Church of the East. He quickly became a favorite of Emperor Peroz I, who preferred his compliant stance to that of Babowai, Catholicos of Seleucia-Ctesiphon and head of the Persian Church, whom he regarded as a pro-Roman traitor. Over time, bar Sawma and Babowai's relationship grew openly antagonistic and came into conflict over the issue of the marriage of bishops, which provoked outrage in the Church of the East. Bar Sawma was instrumental in Babowai's downfall, ultimately leading to the latter's execution by Peroz in 484.

Following Babowai's death, bar Sawma became the most powerful figure in the Persian Church, though he was never elevated to the position of Catholicos, or Patriarch. He pursued a policy of pro-Persian, anti-Roman interaction, and under his leadership the church adopted a more Nestorian theology, though it never fully adhered to the doctrine in his lifetime. He headed the Synod of Beth Lapat in 484, which officially declared Nestorianism as the doctrine of the church as well as disavowed clerical celibacy.

In 485 bar Sawma's political enemies consecrated as patriarch the moderate churchman Acacius of Seleucia-Ctesiphon in the hope that he would prevent the takeover of the Church of the East by the Nestorians. Acacius, despite frequent quarrels with bar Sawma, was unable to prevent the victory of the powerful Nestorian faction. In August a synod was held at Beth Edraï, near Nineveh in which bar Sawma and Acacius reconciled and agreed to meet again to resolve outstanding issues.

The following year, the proposed council was held in Ctesiphon. However, bar Sawma did not participate, and the synod agreed to endorse the teachings of Theodore of Mopsuestia as official doctrine and the marriage of all clergymen. During this period, monophysitism spread throughout his archdiocese, and bar Sawma was faced with hostility from many Christians. Struggling to keep his see, Barsawma negotiated with Acacius to keep his seat.

After the forced closure of the School of Edessa in 489 by Emperor Zeno, bar Sawma welcomed the teachers and students and reopened the School of Nisibis, becoming the key centre for Nestorianism in the East.

Bar Sawma died in 491. According to Barhebraeus, he was killed by the monks of Tur Abdin with the keys of their cells. He also mentions how his tomb may be found in the Church of Saint Jacob of Nisibis.

== Sources ==
- Becker, Adam H. "Barṣawma of Nisibis". In Sebastian P. Brock; Aaron M. Butts; George A. Kiraz; Lucas Van Rompay (eds.). Gorgias Encyclopedic Dictionary of the Syriac Heritage: Electronic Edition.
- Chabot, Jean-Baptiste (1902). Synodicon orientale ou recueil de synodes nestoriens (PDF). Paris: Imprimerie Nationale.
- Meyendorff, John (1989). Imperial unity and Christian divisions: The Church 450-680 A.D. The Church in history. Vol. 2. Crestwood, NY: St. Vladimir's Seminary Press. ISBN 9780881410563.
- Wigram, William Ainger (1910). An Introduction to the History of the Assyrian Church or The Church of the Sassanid Persian Empire 100-640 A.D. London: Society for Promoting Christian Knowledge. ISBN 9780837080789.
- Bar Hebraeus, Ecclesiastical Chronicle (ed. Abeloos and Lamy), ii. 72–8.
- Stephen Gerö, Barsauma of Nisibis and Persian Christianity in the Fifth Century, Corpus Scriptorum Christianorum Orientalium, Subsidia 63, Louvain 1981
