= Paul of Seleucia-Ctesiphon =

Paul was briefly Patriarch of the Church of the East in 539. He is included in the traditional list of patriarchs of the Church of the East.

== Sources ==
Brief accounts of Paul's reign are given in the Ecclesiastical Chronicle of the Jacobite writer Bar Hebraeus (floruit 1280) and in the ecclesiastical histories of the Nestorian writers Mari (twelfth-century), ʿAmr (fourteenth-century) and Sliba (fourteenth-century). His life is also covered in the Chronicle of Seert.

== Paul's patriarchate ==
The following account of Paul's reign is given by Mari:

This father was the archdeacon of Mar Yozaq, bishop of al-Ahwaz, whom he succeeded on that throne, and was one of those men from whom the fathers had extracted an oath that they would take the part neither of Narsaï nor Elishaʿ. He is said to have been metropolitan of Jundishapur before he was elected patriarch. Anushirwan accepted his appointment because he had once, in the blazing heat of summer, brought up a train of mules carrying large amounts of water, which he offered to the soldiers to drink; and because he was grateful for the exceptional zeal he had shown on that occasion, he took this opportunity to repay his debt. Paul held the patriarchate for only two months, though some say it was a year.

== See also ==
- List of patriarchs of the Church of the East

== Notes ==
Church of the East titles
Preceded by Elishaʿ (524–537)	Catholicos-Patriarch of the East (539)	Succeeded by Aba I (540–552)
