= Simeon of Rev Ardashir =

Simeon of Rev Ardashir (7th or 8th century), whose name in Syriac is Shemʿon, was a Persian priest and jurist of the Church of the East. He served as the metropolitan bishop of Fars with his seat at Rev Ardashir. His dates are uncertain, as is his identification with the metropolitan of the same name known from a pair of letters.

== Treatise ==
Simeon wrote a treatise, the Law of Inheritance, on hereditary law and family law in Middle Persian. The Persian version is lost, but a Syriac translation survives, made by an anonymous monk of Beth Qatraye (Eastern Arabia) at the request of a priest named Simeon. This may be a contemporary translation. The monk notes that the work was difficult to translate. A single copy of the Syriac translation is found in the manuscript in the Vatican manuscript Borg.sir.81, itself a 19th-century copy of a lost manuscript from Alqosh (no. 169). Simeon was sometimes quoted in Arabic works, such as by the Patriarch Timothy I. These Arabic extracts were collected by Eduard Sachau and are found the Vatican manuscript Vat.ar.153. In the manuscript Borg.sir.81, Simeon's treatise comes before the treatise of Ishoʿbokht. There is some dispute over which of these treatises was written first. The Church of the East's legal tradition probably arose in response to the Arab conquest of Persia and the need to better define Christian practice against Islamic law.

Simeon's treatise is written in the form of questions and answers in 22 chapters. In the preface, Simeon offers his treatise as the answer to four basic questions:

Why did our Lord not confer them [ecclesiastical laws] by his own legislation, what is the reason that we do not make dīnē [rules] according to the nāmōsā [law] of Moses, from where did we receive the legal tradition which has reached us, and how are certain special cases of laws in the practice we follow to be treated?"

In other words, he asks why the canon law was not handed down by God, why Christians do not follow the law of Moses and where their practices do come from. In his discussion of the principles of canon law, Simeon gives priority to the Church Fathers. He also cites unwritten custom. His book was treated as authoritative by later generations and became an important source for the Synodicon Orientale.

== Identity ==
Simeon's Syriac translator calls him a "priest and teacher" as well as metropolitan of Fars. A metropolitan named Simeon, possibly but not certainly the same person as the jurist, was the recipient of two letters from the Catholicos Ishoʿyahb III (649–659). The metropolitan refused to recognize the authority of the catholicos, specifically the requirement that he and his suffragan bishops receive "perfection" (confirmation) from the catholicos. There were at that time twenty bishops under Simeon who had not been perfected, as well as Simeon himself and his predecessor. After Ishoʿyahb paid a visit to Rev Ardashir, the seat of the bishop of Fars, Simeon recognized his authority.

Ishoʿyahb also wrote to Simeon with his concerns for the faith in Beth Qatraye, where the bishops had submitted to the Islamic authorities, and Beth Mazunaye, where Christians were converting to Islam to avoid paying the jizya. Both provinces were under Simeon's jurisdiction. Ishoʿyahb also accused Simeon of refusing to appoint a bishop of Kalnah because the Indian Christians had offended him.

== Editions ==
- Adolf Rücker, ed. and German trans., Die Canones des Simeon von Rêvârdešîr, Ph.D. diss., University of Breslau, 1908.
- In Eduard Sachau, ed. and German trans., Syrische Rechtsbücher, 3 (1914), pp. 207–253.
- Amir Harrak, ed. and English trans., The Law Code of Simeon, Bishop of Rev-Ardashir (Texts from Christian Late Antiquity, 57), Gorgias Press, 2019. doi:10.31826/9781463241414

== Bibliography ==
- Baum, Wilhelm (2003) [2000]. "The Age of the Arabs: 650–1258". The Church of the East: A Concise History. Translated by Miranda G. Henry. London and New York: RoutledgeCurzon. pp. 42–83.
- Brock, Sebastian P. (1999). "Syriac Writers from Beth Qaṭraye". ARAM Periodical. 11 (1): 85–96. doi:10.2143/aram.11.1.504452.
- Harrak, Amir (2017). "The Code of law of Simeon, Bishop of Rev-Ardashir: Presentation and Translation". Journal of the Canadian Society for Syriac Studies. 17: 49–78. doi:10.31826/jcsss-2017-170106.
- Hoyland, Robert G. (1997). Seeing Islam As Others Saw It: A Survey and Evaluation of Christian, Jewish and Zoroastrian Writings on Early Islam. Darwin Press.
- Van Rompay, Lucas (2011). "Shemʿon of Rev Ardashir". In Sebastian P. Brock; Aaron M. Butts; George A. Kiraz; Lucas Van Rompay (eds.). Gorgias Encyclopedic Dictionary of the Syriac Heritage. Gorgias Press.
- Weitz, Lev E. (2018). Between Christ and Caliph: Law, Marriage, and Christian Community in Early Islam. University of Pennsylvania Press.
- Wilmshurst, David (2011). The Martyred Church: A History of the Church of the East. East and West Publishing.
