= Fars (East Syriac ecclesiastical province) =

Metropolitan province of the Church of the East

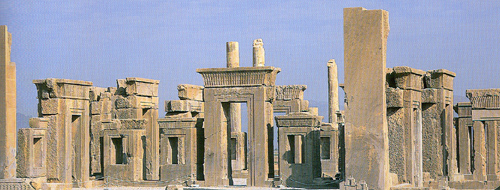
The ruins of Persepolis

Metropolitanate of Fars or Pars (Persia) was an East Syriac metropolitan province of the Church of the East between the sixth and twelfth centuries. It was centered in what is now Fars province (Persia), the historic cradle of ancient Persian civilization. Besides several centers in the Fars region itself, this East Syriac ecclesiastical province also included several dioceses in Arabia and a diocese for the island of Soqotra.

== Background ==
According to tradition, Christianity was brought to the modern Iranian province of Fars (Classical Syriac: ܒܝܬ ܦܪܣܝܐ Beth Parsaye) by Persian merchants exposed to the teaching of the apostle Addai in Roman Edessa. This tradition, which rejected a significant role for the apostle Mari, widely credited with the evangelization of the Mesopotamian provinces of the Church of the East, reflects a deep division within the Church of the East in the Sassanian period between its Syriac and Persian converts. The patriarchs of Seleucia-Ctesiphon frequently found it difficult to exert authority over the ecclesiastical province of Fars.

Several dioceses in Fars and northern Arabia (Syriac: Beth Qatraye, ܒܝܬ ܩܛܪܝܐ) existed by the beginning of the fifth century, but they were not grouped into a metropolitan province in 410. After establishing five metropolitan provinces in Mesopotamia, Canon XXI of the synod of Isaac merely provided that 'the bishops of the more remote dioceses of Fars, of the Islands, of Beth Madaye, of Beth Raziqaye and of the country of Abrashahr must accept the definition established in this council at a later date'.

The signature of the bishop of Rev Ardashir (the metropolis of Fars) came between those of the five metropolitans and the suffragan bishops in the acts of the synod of Dadishoʿ in 424, suggesting that Fars had by then been recognized as a sixth metropolitan province.

There were at least eight dioceses in Fars and the islands of the Persian Gulf in the fifth century and probably eleven or more by the end of the Sassanian period. In Fars, the diocese of Rev Ardashir is first mentioned in 420, the dioceses of Ardashir Khurrah (Shiraf), Darabgard, Istakhr and Kazrun (Shapur or Bih Shapur) in 424, and a diocese of Qish in 540. On the Arabian shore of the Persian Gulf, dioceses are first mentioned for Dairin and Mashmahig (Bahrain) in 410 and for Beth Mazunaye (Oman) in 424. By 540, the bishop of Rev Ardashir had become a metropolitan, responsible for the dioceses of both Fars and Arabia. A fourth Arabian diocese, Hagar, is first mentioned in 576. A fifth diocese, Hatta (previously part of the diocese of Hagar), is first mentioned in the acts of a regional synod held on the Persian Gulf island of Dairin in 676 by the patriarch Giwargis to determine the episcopal succession in Beth Qatraye but may have been created before the Arab conquest.

After the Arab conquests, Fars and northern Arabia (Beth Qatraye) were marked out for a thoroughgoing process of Islamization, and Christianity declined more rapidly in these regions than in any other part of the former Sassanian empire. The last-known bishop of the metropolitan see of Rev Ardashir was ʿAbdishoʿ, who was present at the enthronement of the patriarch ʿAbdishoʿ III in 1138. In 890 Eliya of Damascus listed the suffragan sees of Fars, in order of seniority, as Shiraz, Istakhr, Shapur (probably to be identified with Bih Shapur, i.e. Kazrun), Karman, Darabgard, Shiraf (Ardashir Khurrah), Marmadit, and the island of Soqotra. Only two bishops are known from the mainland dioceses: Melek of Darabgard, who was deposed in the 560s, and Gabriel of Bih Shapur, who was present at the enthronement of ʿAbdishoʿ I in 963. The Mongols spared Fars for its timely submission in the 1220s, but by then, there seemed to have been few Christians left, although an East Syriac community (probably without bishops) survived at Hormuz. This community is last mentioned in the sixteenth century.

Of the northern Arabian dioceses, Mashmahig is last mentioned around 650, and Dairin, Oman (Beth Mazunaye), Hagar, and Hatta in 676. Soqotra remained an isolated outpost of Christianity in the Arabian Sea, and its bishop attended the enthronement of the patriarch Yahballaha III in 1281. Marco Polo visited the island in the 1280s and claimed it had an East Syriac archbishop, with a suffragan bishop on the nearby 'Island of Males'. Thomas of Marga mentions that Yemen and Sana'a had a bishop named Peter during the reign of the patriarch Abraham II (837–50), who had earlier served in China. This diocese is not mentioned again.

== Dioceses in Fars ==
=== The Archdiocese of Rev Ardashir ===
The bishop Yazdad of Rev Ardashir was among the signatories of the acts of the synod of Dadishoʿ in 424.

The bishop Mari of Rev Ardashir flourished around 450. He received a celebrated letter from the bishop Ibas of Edessa, and is known to have written a commentary on the letters of Acacius of Amid, a commentary on the book of Daniel, and a treatise against the magi of Nisibis.

Three metropolitans of Fars appear to have been consecrated during the schism of Narsaï and Elishaʿ in the early years of the sixth century: Isaac, who died before 540; his successor Ishoʿbokht; and Acacius. Ishoʿbokht (who was allowed to continue a priest) and Acacius were both deposed by the patriarch Aba I in 540 and replaced by the metropolitan Maʿna, who was among the signatories of the patriarch's Pragmatic in 540 and adhered by letter to the acts of the synod of Aba I in 544.

The metropolitan Claudian 'of Mahoza Hdatta' ('the new town'), possibly the bishop of a recent deportation from Roman territory to Rev Ardashir, was among the signatories of the acts of the synod of Joseph in 554.

The metropolitan Shemʿon of Fars was the recipient of a letter written by the patriarch Ishoʿyahb III (649–59) complaining about conversions to Islam by the Christians of Beth Mazonaye (Oman) during the Arab conquest.

Ishoʿbokht, a noted scholar, was the metropolitan consecrated by either Hnanisho I (686–698) or Hnanisho II (773–780).

Patriarch Timothy I (780–823) consecrated another Shemʿon as metropolitan. He forbade him to wear white, eat meat or marry, but he exempted his suffragans from the patriarch's requirement to be confirmed ("perfected"). He also removed India from the jurisdiction of Fars.

The bishop Shlemun of Zabe (al-Zawabi) was appointed metropolitan of Fars during the reign of the patriarch Mari (987–99). Shlemun seems to have died shortly after his appointment, as the same patriarch later consecrated the bishop Yohannan of Shenna (al-Sin) metropolitan of Fars 'after the death of its metropolitan'.

The metropolitan Yohannan, formerly bishop of Egypt, was metropolitan of Fars when Elijah of Nisibis completed his Chronography in 1018/19.

The metropolitan ʿAbdishoʿ of Fars was present at the consecration of the patriarch ʿAbdishoʿ III in 1139.

=== The diocese of Istakhr ===
The bishop Zadoï of Istakhr was among the signatories of the acts of the synod of Dadishoʿ in 424.

=== The diocese of Ardashir Khurrah (Shiraf) ===
The bishop Farbokht of Ardashir Khurrah was one of eleven named bishops listed in the acts of the synod of Dadishoʿ in 424 as having been reproved at the synods of Isaac in 410 and Yahballaha I in 420.

The bishop Qardagh of Ardashir Khurrah was among the bishops who rallied to the patriarch Aba I in 540 and signed his Pragmatic.

=== The diocese of Darabgard ===
The bishop Yazdbuzid of Darabgard was one of eleven named bishops listed in the acts of the synod of Dadishoʿ in 424 as having been reproved at the synods of Isaac in 410 and Yahballaha I in 420.

The bishop Malekh of Darabgard flourished during the reign of the patriarch Joseph (551–67). He used the influence at the court of bishop Ezekiel of Zabe to obtain a royal decree suspending local persecution in his diocese. The patriarch Joseph, angry that he had not been consulted, confiscated the decree, insisting that only the patriarch had the right to speak for Christians in the Sassanian empire. As a result of this incident, the Christians of Fars refused to recognize Joseph's authority. Their example encouraged the bishops of the Mesopotamian provinces to move against this deeply unpopular patriarch, and in 567, Joseph was deposed by a synod of Mesopotamian bishops.

=== The diocese of Bih Shapur (Kazrun) ===
The bishop Farbokht of Bishapur (Kazrun) was appointed patriarch of the Church of the East in 421 by the Persian king Bahram but was deposed after only a few months in office.

The bishop Abraham of Bih Shapur was among the bishops who rallied to the patriarch Aba I in 540.

=== The diocese of Qish ===
The bishop David of Qish, a diocese either in Fars or Beth Qatraye, was among the bishops who rallied to the patriarch Aba I in 540.

== Dioceses in Beth Qatraye and Arabia ==
=== Metropolitanate of Beth Qatraye ===
The metropolitan Thomas of Fars, 'bishop metropolitan of Beth Qatraye', was among the signatories of the acts of the synod of Dairin in 676.

=== The diocese of Mashmahig ===
The bishop Batai of Mashmahig, who had already been convicted on a previous occasion for an unknown misdemeanor, was again convicted and deposed at the synod of Isaac in 410, and the bishop Eliya of Mashmahig was among the signatories of the acts of the synod.

=== The diocese of Beth Mazunaye (Oman) ===
The bishop Yohannan of 'Mazun' was among the signatories of the acts of the synod of Dadishoʿ in 424.

The bishop Samuel of 'Mazun' was among the signatories of the acts of the synod of Ezekiel in 576.

The bishop Stephen 'of the Mazunaye' was among the signatories of the acts of the synod of Dairin in 676.

=== The diocese of Dairin ===
The bishop Paul was consecrated by the patriarch Isaac in 410 for 'the islands of Ardai and Toduru', probably Dairin.

In 586 the patriarch Ishoʿyahb I (582–95) wrote a collection of twenty-two canons for the use of the bishop Yaʿqob of Dairin.

The bishop Ishoʿyahb of Dairin was among the signatories of the acts of the synod of Dairin in 676.

=== The diocese of Hagar ===
The bishop Pusaï of Hagar was among the signatories of the acts of the synod of Dairin in 676.

=== The diocese of Hatta ===
The bishop Shahin of Hatta was among the signatories of the acts of the synod of Dairin in 676.

=== The diocese of Soqotra ===
The patriarch Sabrishoʿ III consecrated an unnamed bishop for Soqotra shortly after his consecration in 1063/4.

The bishop Quriaqos of Soqotra was present at the consecration of the patriarch Yahballaha III in 1281.

=== The diocese of Yemen and Sanaa ===
The monk, Peter of the monastery of Beth ʿAbe, was bishop of Yemen and Sanaʿa during the reign of the patriarch Abraham II (837–50). Peter was a disciple of his fellow-monk David, who was consecrated metropolitan of Beth Sinaye (China) during the reign of Timothy I (780–823), and seems to have accompanied David to China as a bishop before he was appointed bishop of Yemen and Sanaʿa.
