= Dietmar W. Winkler =

Austrian church historian (born 1963)

Dietmar Werner Winkler (born April 15, 1963, in Wolfsberg in Carinthia) is an Austrian scholar of patristics and ecclesiastical history. He is a professor and the founding director of the Center for the Study of the Christian East at the University of Salzburg.

== Career ==
Winkler studied Catholic theology, religious education, Philology and Ancient History at the Universities of Graz and Innsbruck and completed postgraduate training in ecumenical theology at the Ecumenical Institute Château de Bossey of the World Council of Churches (University of Geneva). He obtained the degrees Mag.phil., Mag.theol. and a Certificate in Ecumenical Studies. He received his doctorate in theology from the University of Innsbruck with a thesis on Coptic Christianity. With a scholarship from the Austrian Academy of Sciences, he completed his habilitation in patrology, dogma history and ecumenical theology at the University of Graz in 2000 with a thesis on East Syriac Christianity. In 1998 he was a visiting scholar at the "St. Ephrem Ecumenical Research Institute" of Mahatma Gandhi University in Kottayam (Kerala, India) and a Fulbright Scholar at the Collegeville Institute of St. John's University (MN, USA) in 2001. At Boston University (MA, USA), Winkler was Professor and associate director of the Division of Religious and Theological Studies from 2003 to 2005.

In 2005, Dietmar W. Winkler was appointed Professor of Patristic Studies and History of Christianity at the University of Salzburg. He was several times head of the Department of Biblical Studies and Ecclesiastical History (2006-2009, 2013-2015, 2019-2023) as well as Dean of the Faculty of Catholic Theology (2015-2017, since 2023) and has been director of the Centre for the Study of the Christian East (ZECO) at the University of Salzburg since 2006. In 2012, he conducted research as visiting scholar at the Center for the Study of World Religions at Harvard University (Cambridge, MA, USA) and in 2018 at the "Centre Paul-Albert-Février - Textes et Documents de la Méditerranée antique et médiévale" at the Université Aix-Marseille.

== Scholarship ==
Dietmar W. Winkler is an expert on Oriental Christianity and its ecumenical relations. His work focuses on the cultural history and present of the Eastern Churches, Oriental Christian literature and historical theology in their political contexts. At the University of Salzburg he established a research focus on the spread of Christianity along the Silk Road to Central Asia and China (Salzburg International Conferences on Syriac Christianity in China and Central Asia).

Winkler is a consultant to the Pontifical Council for Promoting Christian Unity (Vatican), a member of the Theological Commission of the Austrian Bishops' Conference and a board member of the Pro Oriente Foundation. In 2010 he became a member of the European Academy of Sciences and Arts. Among others, he is a member of the Society for the Study of the Christian East (GSCO), the North American Patristics Society (NAPS) and was chairman of the Association of Catholic Church Historians of Austria (AKKÖ) in 2016–2021.

Winkler is editor of the scholarly series orientalia – patristica – oecumenica (LIT-Verlag, Münster/Germany et al.), Pro Oriente Studies in Syriac Tradition (Gorgias Press, Piscataway, NJ/USA) and, together with Alfred Rinnerthaler, of Wissenschaft und Religion (Peter Lang, Berlin et al.), as well as on the editorial board of Texts and Studies in Eastern Christianity (Brill, Leiden/NL et al.), Handes Amsorya: Journal of Armenian Studies (Mechitaristenverlag, Vienna) and The Harp: A Review of Syriac and Oriental Studies (Kottayam/India).

== Books ==
- تاریخ مختصر کلیسای شرق (2023, ISBN 978-622-796-727-2). Persian trans. of The Church of the East. A concise History.
- Biserica Asiriana a Rasaritului. O scurta istorie a crestinismului siro-oriental (2021, ISBN 978-606-666-945-0).
- Wann kommt die Einheit? Ökumene als Programm und Herausforderung (2014, ISBN 3-222-13386-7).
- The Church of the East. A concise history. Together with W. Baum (2003, ISBN 0-415-29770-2).
- Ostsyrisches Christentum. Untersuchungen zu Christologie, Ekklesiologie und zu den ökumenischen Dialogen der Assyrischen Kirche des Ostens (2004, ISBN 3-8258-6796-X).
- Die Apostolische Kirche des Ostens. Geschichte der sogenannten „Nestorianer“ (2000, ISBN 3-902005-05-X).
- Die Ostkirchen. Ein Leitfaden (1997, ISBN 3-900993-72-6).
- Koptische Kirche und Reichskirche. Altes Schisma und neuer Dialog. (1997, ISBN 3-7022-2055-0).

== Books edited on Ecumenism and Oriental Christianity ==
- Die katholischen Ostkirchen. Herkunft - Geschichte - Gegenwart. With C. Lange, K. Pinggéra, Hacik R. Gazer (2024, ISBN 978-3-451-38200-0)
- Identity and Witness. Syriac Christians of the Middle East and India between homeland and global presence. With A. Schmoller (2023, ISBN 978-1-4632-4570-2).
- Synodalität als Möglichkeitsraum. Erfahrungen – Herausforderungen – Perspektiven. With R. Cerny-Werner (2023, ISBN 978-3-7022-4084-4).
- Patrologie und Ökumene. Theresia Hainthaler zum 75. Geburtstag. With P. Knauer SJ and A. Riedl (2022, ISBN 978-3-451-39356-3).
- Silk Road Traces. .Studies on Syriac Christianity in China and Central Asia. With L. Tang (2022, ISBN 978-3-643-91228-2).
- Artifact, Text, Context. Studies on Syriac Christianity in China and Central Asia. With L. Tang (2020, ISBN 978-3-643-91195-7).
- Towards a Culture of Co-Existence in Pluralistic Societies. The Middle East and India. (2020, ISBN 978-1-4632-4253-4).
- Monastic Life in the Armenian Church. Glorious Past – Ecumenical Reconsideration. With J. Dum-Tragut (2018, ISBN 978-3-643-91066-0).
- Winds of Jingjiao. Studies on Syriac Christianity in China and Central Asia. With L. Tang (2016, ISBN 978-3-643-90754-7).
- Syrische Studien. Beiträge zum 8. Deutschen Syrologie-Symposium in Salzburg 2014. (2016, ISBN 978-3-643-50743-3).
- From the Oxus River to the Chinese Shores. Studies on East Syriac Christianity in China and Central Asia. With L. Tang (2013, ISBN 978-3-643-90329-7).
- Syriac Christianity in the Middle East and India: Contributions and Challenges. (2013, ISBN 978-1-4632-0247-7).
- Diakonat der Frau. Befunde aus biblischer, patristischer, ostkirchlicher, liturgischer und systematisch-theologischer Sicht (2010, 2nd ed. 2013 ISBN 978-3-643-50181-3).
- Syriac Churches encountering Islam. Past experiences and future perspectives. (2010, ISBN 978-1-61143-001-1).
- Vom Umbruch zum Aufbruch? Kirchliche und gesellschaftliche Entwicklungen in Ostmitteleuropa nach dem Zerfall des Kommunismus. (2010, ISBN 978-3-7022-3078-4).
- Hidden Treasures and Intercultural Encounters. Studies on East Syriac Christianity in China and Central Asia. With L. Tang (2009, 2nd ed. 2014 ISBN 978-3-643-50045-8).
- Oikos Europa zwischen Oikonomia und Oikumene. Globale Marktwirtschaft, EU-Erweiterung und christliche Verantwortung. With W. Nausner: (2004, ISBN 3-7022-2554-4).
