= Eliya ibn ʿUbaid =

Eliya ibn ʿUbaid (Arabic: إيليا بن عبيد), also called Īlīyā al-Jawharī, (Note: In the Latin of G. S. Assemani, Elias Geveri; in the Latin of a Vatican catalogue, Helias Giouhari. His first name is sometimes spelled Elia and his surname may also be spelled Jauhari or Ğawhari. He is commonly known as Eliya of Damascus, Latin Elias Damascenus. His given name may be anglicised Elijah.) was a theologian, philosopher, canonist and chronographer of the Church of the East. He served as the bishop of Jerusalem from 878 or 879 until 893 and then as the archbishop of Damascus. (Note: See dioceses of the Church of the East to 1318.) He wrote in Arabic. He died after 903.

== Life ==
The surname al-Jawharī, meaning "the jeweller", probably refers to the business of Eliya's family. He is called ʿAlī ibn ʿUbaid by Ibn al-Muqaffaʿ, who puns his nickname as al-Bannāʾ, "the bricklayer". Before he became a bishop, he lived in the vicinity of Baghdad, the capital and largest city of the Abbasid Caliphate.

As bishop of Jerusalem from 878 or 879, Eliya was a suffragan of Damascus. He was consecrated archbishop of Damascus by the Patriarch John III on 15 July 893. In the words of ʿAmr ibn Mattā, dating by the Hijrī era and the Seleucid era, "in the middle of [July] of the year 280 of the [Hijra], i.e. the year 1204 of the Seleucid era [...] on the day of his own ordination, [John] ordained Elias ibn ʿUbayd, the bishop of Jerusalem, as the metropolitan of Damascus."

As archbishop, Eliya was the metropolitan over five dioceses: Aleppo, Jerusalem, Mabbugh, Mopsuestia, and Tarsus and Melitene. His formal title was "metropolitan of Damascus, Jerusalem and the Shore", the shore being Cilicia.

== Writings ==
Three works have been ascribed to Eliya: the Concordance of Faith, the Consolation of Sorrows and the Nomocanon Arabicus.

=== Theology ===
In the Concordance of Faith (Arabic Ijtimāʿ al-amāna), Eliya compares and contrasts the confessions of the Church of the East, the Jacobites and the Melkites. It survives in two manuscripts: Bodleian MS Ar. Uri 38 (Huntington 240), copied in the 16th century in Arabic script in Egypt, and Vatican MS Vat. ar. 657, (Note: A digitized version is available online, in black and white with watermarks.) copied in 1692 in East Syriac Garshuni in Iraq.

The authorship of this work is disputed. A note in the Vatican manuscript records that "Eliya al-Jawharī, the metropolitan of Jerusalem, re-wrote or copied the treatise that follows". The Bodleian manuscript ascribes the treatise not to Eliya but to ʿAlī ibn Dāwūd al-Arfādī. The 13th-century scholar Al-Muʾtaman ibn al-ʿAssāl in the eighth chapter of his Summa of the Foundations of Religion and of the Traditions of Reliable Knowledge presents a synopsis of the Concordance. The authorship of the text was already uncertain by that time. He attributes it to "Eliya, the metropolitan of Jerusalem", but adds that "it is [also] said that this [treatise] is [by] ʿAlī ibn Dāwūd". Gianfranco Fiaccadori points out that there were never metropolitans of Jerusalem in the Church of the East, only bishops.

=== Philosophy ===
The Consolation of Sorrows or Casting Away of Sorrows (Arabic Tasliyat al-aḥzān), (Note: Latin De curandis affectibus animae, from a Vatican catalogue compiled between 1569 and 1574.) attributed in the manuscript to "Eliya, the bishop of Jerusalem", was a popular philosophical text and survives in eight manuscripts. It is inspired by and quotes liberally from the Art of Dispelling Sorrows of the Muslim philosopher al-Kindī. The modern Egyptian philosopher Abdel Rahman Badawi considered it to be "of little philosophical interest". It is written in the form of a letter to an anonymous Christian friend who had fallen into disgrace. Two individual Christians who fell into disgrace in Eliya's time are mentioned by name: Abū Ayyūb and Abū l-Qāsim. These are probably to be identified with Abū Ayyūb Sulaymān ibn Wahb and his son Abū l-Qāsim ʿUbayd Allāh ibn Sulaymān, both of whom served for periods in the Abbasid vizierate and were arrested and imprisoned in 878 or 879. Since Eliya was not yet a bishop when he wrote and was living in the vicinity of Baghdad at the time, he must have been writing before 878–79.

The Consolation of Sorrows can be divided into two parts. The first is philosophical and rationalistic, including references to Socrates, Aristotle and Alexander's letter to his mother. The second is exegetical. The stories of figures from the Old Testament who overcame adversity are apparently written from memory.

The Consolation of Sorrows survives in a manuscript copy dated by Giorgio Levi Della Vida to the 9th century. At some point after about 1570, the original manuscript lost its beginning and was bound with other pieces into a new codex. The Vatican catalogue attributes the Consolation to Īlīyā al-Jawharī, perhaps based on the lost beginning. It has been published and translated into Italian.

=== Law and chronology ===
The Nomocanon Arabicus (or Collectio canonica) is the second oldest collection of canon law of the Church of the East after that of Gabriel of Basra composed shortly before in Syriac. Although it is often dated to about 893 or about 900, it refers to two documents produced by Patriarch John IV (900–905), one of which can be precisely dated to 11 January 903. This date is the terminus post quem for the composition of the Nomocanon.

The Nomocanon only survives in a thirteenth-century manuscript (MS Vat. ar. 157), where it is ascribed to "Metropolitan Eliya of Damascus". Eliya translated the texts he collected into Arabic. Besides the canons of the synods of the Church of the East from Isaac (410) to George I (676), he included some canons from the Roman church, to which he had easy access in Damascus: Ancyra (314), Neocaesarea (315), Nicaea (325) and Constantinople (381). He also included some pseudo-apostolic canons, such as the Apostolic Canons and the Teachings of the Apostles, and the false "canons of the 318 fathers" of the Nicaea.

The Nomocanon is chronologically ordered. Eliya compiled a list of the dioceses of the Church of the East. This list is of immense value to the historian, but it is not a complete list. It does not include the dioceses of the province of China or the province of India, perhaps because metropolitans were no longer being sent to them. The church in China had suffered severely in the Great Anti-Buddhist Persecution of 845 and the Guangzhou massacre of 878. Eliya's list includes a total of fifteen provinces, which he calls "eparchies": the province of the Patriarch, the six other provinces of the interior and the eight provinces of the exterior (seven in the east and one, Eliya's own, in the west). Since Eliya wrote in Arabic, while the official records of the church were kept in Syriac, there is some uncertainty regarding the identification of some dioceses.

Eliya also included the oldest surviving list of patriarchs of the Church of the East (at folio 82r). The list of Eliya of Nisibis, however, survives in an older copy. Eliya of Damascus is the first historian to record—and may himself have fabricated—the existence of five apocryphal early patriarchs with the dates of their pontificates: Abris (120–137), Abraham (159–171), Yaʿqob I (190), Aha d'Abuh (204–220) and Shahlufa (220–224). The last two are in fact late third-century bishops of Erbil who were transferred forward in time and upward in office. All five became generally accepted in the historiography of the Church of the East. The first three acquired backstories that made them relatives of Jesus' earthly father, Joseph. Eliya also placed the historical patriarch Tomarsa in the middle of the third century, to fill a gap between Shahlufa and Papa, whose reign began around 280. Unlike his other error, however, this one did not catch on.

Eliya's Nomocanon has been contrasted with that of Ibn al-Ṭayyib of the 11th century. The latter was more thorough but he abbreviated and reformatted the canons, whereas Eliya left them much as he found them but skipped over many. Ignazio Guidi called Ibn al-Ṭayyib's collection a compendium and Eliya's a sampling.

== Sources ==
- Baum, Wilhelm (2003) [2000]. "The Age of the Arabs: 650–1258". The Church of the East: A Concise History. Translated by Miranda G. Henry. London and New York: RoutledgeCurzon. pp. 42–83.
- Dickens, Mark (2019). "Syriac Christianity in Central Asia". In Daniel King (ed.). The Syriac World. London and New York: Routledge. pp. 583–624.
- Fiaccadori, Gianfranco (1984). "On the Dating of Īliyā al-Ğawharī's Collectio canonica". Oriens Christianus. 68: 213–214.
- Fiaccadori, Gianfranco (1986). "Īliyā al-Ğawharī, Īliyā of Damascus". Oriens Christianus. 70: 192–193.
- Gil, Moshe (1997) [1983]. A History of Palestine, 634–1099. Translated by Ethel Broido. Cambridge: Cambridge University Press. ISBN 0-521-59984-9.
- Graf, Georg (1947). Geschichte der Christlichen Arabischen Literatur, Vol. II: Die Schriftsteller bis zur Mitte des 15. Jahrhunderts. Vatican City: Biblioteca Apostolica Vaticana.
- Griffith, S. H. (1996). "The Muslim Philosopher Al-Kindi and His Christian Readers: Three Arab Christian Texts on 'The Dissipation of Sorrows'". Bulletin of the John Rylands Library. 78 (3): 111–128. doi:10.7227/BJRL.78.3.9.
- Kaufhold, Hubert (2012). "Sources of Canon Law in the Eastern Churches". In Wilfried Hartmann; Kenneth Pennington (eds.). The History of Byzantine and Eastern Canon Law to 1500. Catholic University of America Press. pp. 215–342.
- Levi Della Vida, Giorgio (1964). "Il Conforto delle Tristezze de Elia al-Gawharī (Vat. ar. 1492)". Mélanges Eugène Tisserant. Vol. 2, Orient Chrétien, pt. I. Vatican City. pp. 345–397.
- Linder, Amnon (1996). "Christian Communities in Jerusalem". In Joshua Prawer; Haggai Ben-Shammai (eds.). The History of Jerusalem: The Early Muslim Period (638–1099). Yad Izhak Ben-Zvi. pp. 121–162.
- Seleznyov, Nikolai N. (2013). "'Elias Geveri of Damascus' in Russian Studies of Church History: A Witness to the Two-Finger Sign of the Cross in a Medieval Treatise on Denominations of Syrian Christianity". Scrinium. 9 (1): 366–381. doi:10.1163/18177565-90000084.
- Troupeau, Gérard (1969). "Le livre de l'unanimité de la foi de ʿAlī ibn Dāwud al-Arfādī" (PDF). Melto. 5 (2): 197–219.
- Wilmshurst, David (2011). The Martyred Church: A History of the Church of the East. London: East and West Publishing.
- Wilmshurst, David (2016). "Beth Sinaye: A Typical East Syriac Ecclesiastical Province?". In Li Tang; Dietmar W. Winkler (eds.). Winds of Jingjiao: Studies on Syriac Christianity in China and Central Asia. Zürich: LIT Verlag. pp. 253–266.
