= Yahballaha I =

Church of the East patriarch, 415–420

- Grand Metropolitan and Primate of the East
- Church: Church of the East
- See: Patriarchal Province of Seleucia-Ctesiphon
- Installed: 415
- Term ended: 420
- Predecessor: Ahha
- Successor: Ma'na

Yahballaha I was a high official of the Church of the East in Sasanian Persia from 415 to 420. He is included in the traditional list of Church patriarchs. During his tenure he convened the second council of Seleucia-Ctesiphon to address conflicts with the Christian church in the Roman Empire.

Yahballaha I held the offices of bishop, grand metropolitan, and primate of the Patriarchal Province of Seleucia-Ctesiphon of the Church of the East.

== Sources ==
Brief accounts of Yahballaha's term are given in the Ecclesiastical Chronicle of the Jacobite writer Bar Hebraeus (fl. 1280) and in the ecclesiastical histories of the 12th-century Nestorian writer Mari ibn Suleiman and 14th-century Nestorians Amr ibn Matta and Saliba ibn Yuhanna. His life is also recounted in the Chronicle of Seert. In all these accounts he is anachronistically called catholicos, a term used for Church of the East primates from the late fifth century.

Modern assessments of Yahballaha's term can be found in William Wigram's Introduction to the History of the Assyrian Church and David Wilmshurst's The Martyred Church.

Bar Hebraeus, in his Ecclesiastical Chronicle, wrote of Yahballaha I:

After Ahai, Yahballaha. His name means 'gift of God'. He was a pious and learned man, and was consecrated in the sixteenth year of Yazdegerd [r. 399–420], king of the Persians. He is said to have brought back to life a dead man. He was held in great honour by the Persians. When he had fulfilled his office for five years he was warned by the spirit that Yazdegerd was about to return to his insanity and launch a further persecution against the Christians. Then, as he had sought in prayer, he departed to God.
