= Abraham I (Church of the East) =

Legendary figure in the Church of the East

Abraham (Mar Oraham) of Kashkar was a legendary person of the Church of the East, from the family of Jacob, the brother of Jesus, who is conventionally believed to have sat from 159 to 171. There are historical doubts about his existence by later scholars of the period.

== Sources ==
Brief accounts of the life of Abraham are given in the Ecclesiastical Chronicle of the Jacobite writer Bar Hebraeus (floruit 1280) and in the ecclesiastical histories of the Nestorian writers Mari (twelfth-century), ʿAmr (fourteenth-century) and Sliba (fourteenth-century). These accounts differ slightly, and these minor differences are of significance for scholars interested in tracing the various stages in the development of the legend.

== Life of Abraham ==
The following account of the life of Abraham is given by Bar Hebraeus:

After Abrisius, Abraham. He was also from the family of Jacob, the Lord's brother. He was consecrated at Antioch and sent into the East, where the Christians were being persecuted at that time by the Persians. The Persian king's son suffered from epilepsy, and the king was told that Mar Abraham, the head of the Christian religion, was able to cure him. The king summoned Abraham to his presence, noticed that he looked sad and downcast, and asked him why. Then Abraham recounted the evils he and his people were suffering from the Persians. The king promised to end the persecution of the Christians if Abraham healed his son, and that holy man prayed and laid his hands on the king’s son. He was healed, and peace was given to the faithful. After fulfilling his office for twelve years, he died peacefully.

=== Historical doubts about existence ===
Although Abraham is included in traditional lists of primates of the Church of the East, his existence has been doubted by J. M. Fiey, one of the most eminent twentieth-century scholars of the Church of the East. In Fiey's view, Abraham was one of several fictitious bishops of Seleucia-Ctesiphon whose lives were concocted in the sixth century to bridge the gap between the late third century bishop Papa, the first historically attested bishop of Seleucia-Ctesiphon, and the apostle Mari, the legendary founder of Christianity in Persia.

== See also ==
- List of Patriarchs of the Church of the East

== Notes ==
Church of the East titles
Preceded by Abris (121–137)	Patriarch of the East (159–171)	Succeeded by Yaʿqob I (c.190)
