= Patriarch of the Church of the East =

Supreme head of the Church of the East

Catholicos–Patriarch of the Church of the East

Holy See of Seleucia-Ctesiphon
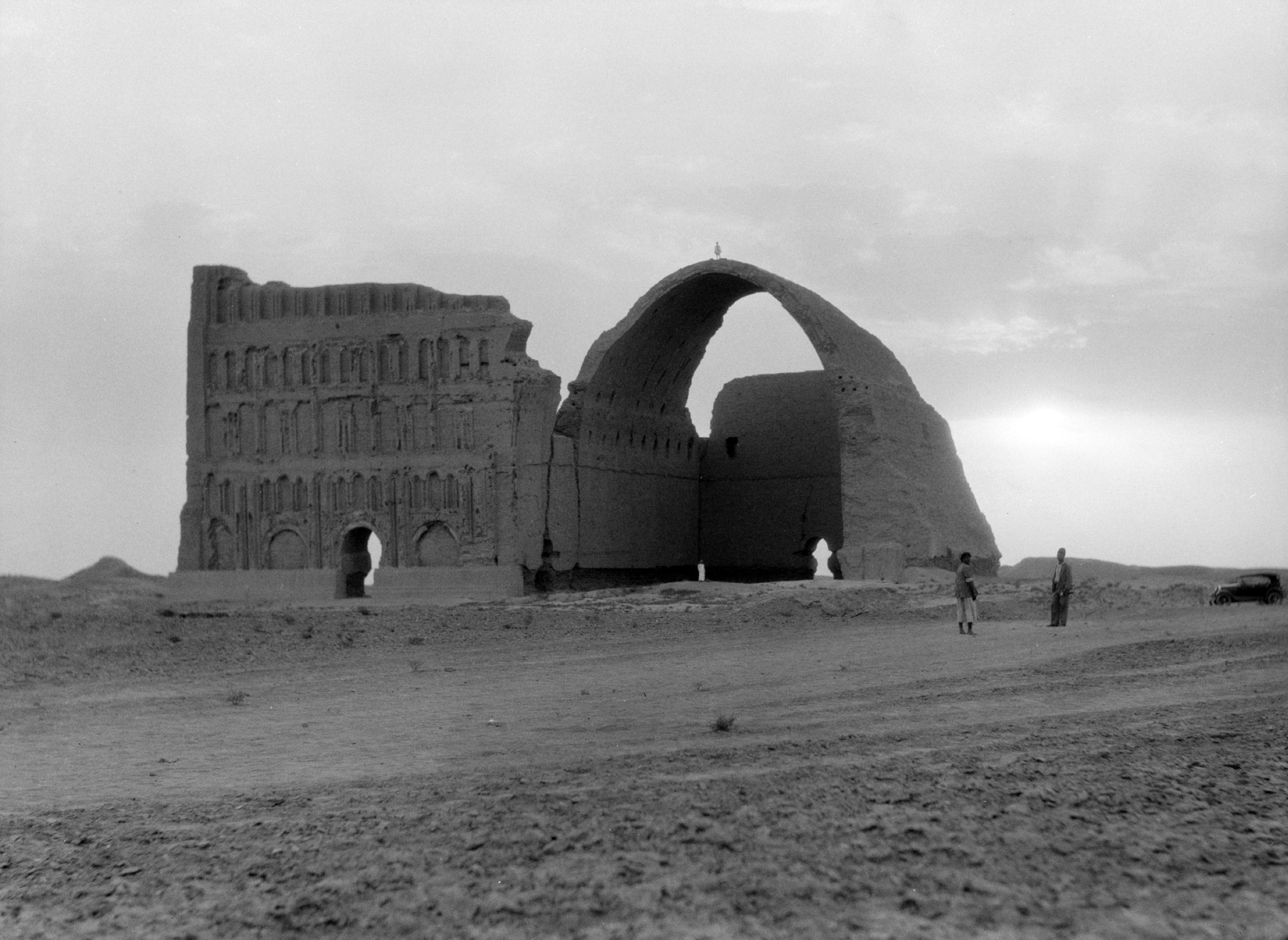
- Taq Kasra, Sasanian ruins in Seleucia-Ctesiphon

Location
- Country: Iraq
- Headquarters: Seleucia-Ctesiphon (410–775); Baghdad (775–1317)

Information
- First holder: Thomas the Apostle (church tradition); Papa bar Aggai (as bishop of Seleucia-Ctesiphon)
- Denomination: Church of the East
- Rite: East Syriac
- Cathedral: Church of Kokhe, Veh-Ardashir
- Language: Syriac

The patriarch of the Church of the East, also known as catholicos-patriarch of the East, patriarch of Babylon, the catholicos of the East, the grand metropolitan of the East or the Jathaliq, is the patriarch, or leader and head bishop (sometimes referred to as Catholicos or universal leader) of the Church of the East. The position dates to the early centuries of Christianity within the Sassanid Empire, and the Church has been known by a variety of names, including the Church of the East, Nestorian Church, the Persian Church, the Sassanid Church, or East Syrian.

Since 1552, rival patriarchal lines were established, traditionalist on one side and pro-Catholic on the other. In modern times, patriarchal succession is claimed from this office to the patriarchal offices of the successor churches: the Chaldean Catholic Church, the Assyrian Church of the East, and the Ancient Church of the East.

== Early history ==
The geographic location of the patriarchate was first in Edessa and then transferred to the Persian capital of Seleucia-Ctesiphon in central Mesopotamia during the Roman conquest of Edessa. In the 9th century the patriarchate moved to Baghdad and then through various cities in what was then Assyria (Assur/Athura) and is now northern Iraq, south east Turkey and northwest Iran, including, Tabriz, Mosul, and Maragheh on Lake Urmia. Following the Chaldean Catholic Church split from the Assyrian Church, the respective patriarchs of these churches continued to move around northern Iraq. In the 19th century, the patriarchate of the Assyrian Church of the East was in the village of Qudshanis in southeastern Turkey. In the 20th century, the Assyrian patriarch went into exile, relocating to Chicago, Illinois, United States. Another patriarchate, which split off in the 1960s as the Ancient Church of the East, is in Baghdad.

The patriarchate of the Church of the East evolved from the position of the leader of the Christian community in Seleucia-Ctesiphon, the Persian capital. While Christianity had been introduced into Assyria then largely under the rule of the Parthian Empire in the first centuries AD, during the earliest period, leadership was unorganized and there was no established succession. In 280, Papa bar Aggai was consecrated as Bishop of Seleucia-Ctesiphon by two visiting bishops, Akha d'abuh' of Arbela and Hai-Beël of Susa, thereby establishing the generally recognized succession. Seleucia-Ctesiphon thus became its own episcopal see, and exerted some de facto control over the wider Persian Christian community. Papa's successors began to use the title of Catholicos, a Roman designation probably adopted due to its use by the Catholicos of Armenia, though at first it carried no formal recognition. In 409 the Church of the East received state recognition from the Sassanid Emperor Yazdegerd I, and the Council of Seleucia-Ctesiphon was called, at which the church's hierarchy was formalized. Bishop Mar Isaac was the first to be officially styled Catholicos over all of the Christians in Persia. Over the next decades, the Catholicoi adopted the additional title of Patriarch, which eventually became the better known designation.

The conventional list of patriarchs of the Church of the East includes around 130 patriarchs. A number of these patriarchs are legendary, or have been included in the standard lists on dubious evidence according to some historians like Jean Maurice Fiey. According to him, the Church of the East, although separated from the State church of the Roman Empire, was not immune to its fashions. One such fashion was to fill in the inevitable gaps in the historical record to trace a succession of bishops in individual dioceses right back to the 1st century, preferably to an apostolic founder. This fashion found particular favour in the case of the diocese of Seleucia-Ctesiphon. The first bishop of Seleucia-Ctesiphon for whom incontestable evidence exists was Papa, who was consecrated around 280. During the 6th century ingenious attempts were made to link Papa with Mari, the legendary apostle of Babylonia. The author of the 6th-century Acts of Mari simply ignored the gap of two and a half centuries that separated the two men and declared that Mari had founded the diocese of Seleucia-Ctesiphon shortly before his death and consecrated Papa as his successor. According to Fiey, later writers were more cunning with their inventions. Shahlufa and Ahadabui, two late-3rd-century bishops of Erbil who had played a notable part in the affairs of the church of Seleucia-Ctesiphon, were 'converted' retrospectively into early patriarchs. Ahadabui was said to have governed the church of Seleucia-Ctesiphon from 204 to 220, and Shahlufa from 220 to 224. However the Chronicle of Seert, names Shahloopa (Shahlufa) as a Patriarch of the Church of the East. Fiey also claims that, for the 2nd century, three patriarchs were frankly invented: Abris (121–37), Abraham (159–71) and Yaʿqob (190). All three men were declared to be relatives of Joseph, the earthly father of Jesus, and given plausible backstories. Fiey also claims these five phantom 'patriarchs' were included in all the later histories of the Church of the East, and by the 12th century their existence was an article of faith for the historian Mari bin Sulaiman. According to Feiy, they are still included by courtesy in the traditional list of patriarchs of the Church of the East, even though most scholars agree that they never existed. However, not all historians and ecclesiastical scholars regard Fiey's opinion to be correct.

== Patriarchal succession, 1318–1552 ==
The patriarch Yahballaha III died in November 1317, probably on Saturday 12 November.

His successor Timothy II, according to the acts of his synod, was consecrated in February 1318. He was still alive in 1328, but probably died two or three years later, to be succeeded after an uncertain interval by Denha II in 1336/7, who himself died in 1381/2. Denha II is known to have been consecrated in Baghdad, thanks to the patronage of the Christian emir Haggi Togai, but may have been normally resident in the Mosul plain village of Karamlish. Three ceremonial contacts between Denha II and the Jacobite church are recorded by the continuator of Bar Hebraeus's Ecclesiastical Chronicle between 1358 and 1364, and on each occasion Denha was living in Karamlish.

Denha II is conventionally believed to have been succeeded by the patriarchs Shemʿon II, Shemʿon III and Eliya IV, but a 15th-century list of patriarchs mentions only a single patriarch named Shemʿon between Denha II and Eliya IV, and is probably to be preferred.

Eliya IV was succeeded by Shemʿon IV at an unknown date in the first half of the 15th century. Eliya's death has conventionally been placed in 1437 but must have been earlier, as a patriarch named Shemʿon is mentioned in a colophon of 1429/30.

Shemʿon IV died on 20 February 1497 and was buried in the monastery of Rabban Hormizd near the Mosul village of Alqosh. He was succeeded by two short-reigned patriarchs: Shemʿon V, first mentioned in a colophon of 1500/1, who died in September 1502 and was buried in the monastery of Mar Awgin; and Eliya V, elected in 1503, who died in 1504 and was buried in the church of Mart Meskinta in Mosul.

Eliya V was succeeded by the patriarch Shemʿon VI (1504–38), who died on 5 August 1538 and was buried in the monastery of Rabban Hormizd. According to the colophon of a contemporary manuscript, the patriarchal throne was still vacant on 19 October 1538.

Shemʿon's brother the metropolitan Ishoʿyahb Bar Mama, who had been natar kursya throughout his reign, is first mentioned as patriarch in a colophon of 1539. Shemʿon VII Ishoʿyahb died on 1 November 1558 and was buried, like his predecessor, in the monastery of Rabban Hormizd near Alqosh. His reign saw the schism of 1552 that resulted in the creation of the Shimun line in 1553.

== Schism of 1552 ==
In 1552 a section of the Church of the East, angered by the appointment of minors to important episcopal positions by the patriarch Shemʿon VII Ishoʿyahb, revolted against his authority. The rebels elected in his stead Sulaqa, the superior of the monastery of Rabban Hormizd near Alqosh, but were unable to consecrate him as no bishop of metropolitan rank was available, as canonically required. Franciscan missionaries were already at work among the Nestorians, and they persuaded Sulaqa's supporters to legitimize their position by seeking Sulaqa's consecration by Pope Julius III (1550–5). Sulaqa went to Rome, where he made a satisfactory Catholic profession of faith and presented a letter, drafted by his supporters in Mosul, which set out his claims to be recognized as patriarch. This letter, which has survived in the Vatican archives, grossly distorted the truth. The rebels claimed that the Nestorian patriarch Shemʿon VII Ishoʿyahb had died in 1551 and had been succeeded illegitimately by 'Shemʿon VIII Denha' (1551–8), a non-existent patriarch invented purely for the purpose of bolstering the legitimacy of Sulaqa's election. The Vatican was taken in by this fraud, and recognised Sulaqa as the founding patriarch of the Chaldean Catholic Church in April 1553, thereby creating a lasting schism in the Church of the East. It was only several years later that the Vatican discovered that Shemʿon VII Ishoʿyahb was still alive.

== Patriarchal succession, 16th to 18th centuries ==
The patriarchal succession after the schism of 1552 is certain in the case of the Mosul patriarchate, because up to the beginning of the 19th century all but one of its patriarchs were buried in the monastery of Rabban Hormizd and their epitaphs, which give the date of their deaths, have survived. Shemʿon VII's successor Eliya VI died on 26 May 1591, after having been a metropolitan for 15 years and patriarch for 32 years; Eliya VII on 26 May 1617; Eliya VIII on 18 June 1660; Eliya IX Yohannan on 17 May 1700; Eliya X Marogin on 14 December 1722; and Eliya XII Ishoʿyahb in 1804. Eliya XI Denha died of plague in Alqosh on 29 April 1778, and was exceptionally buried in the town rather than the monastery, which had been abandoned and locked up following a Persian attack in 1743.

The information available on Sulaqa and his successors is much less exact. The date of Sulaqa's election in 1552 is not known, but he was confirmed as 'patriarch of Mosul' by the Vatican on 28 April 1553, and was martyred at the beginning of 1555, probably (according to a contemporary poem of ʿAbdishoʿ IV) on 12 January. The date of ʿAbdishoʿ IV’s succession in 1555 is not known, but a colophon mentions that he died on 11 September 1570. The dates of Shemʿon VIII Yahballaha's succession and death (presumably in 1570 and 1580 respectively) are not known. Shemʿon IX Denha was elected patriarch in 1580 and (according to Assemani) died in 1600. Shemʿon X, elected in 1600, is said to have died in 1638, according to a later letter of Eliya XII (d. 1804) cited by Tisserant.

Information on the patriarchal succession in the Qudshanis patriarchate for the remainder of the seventeenth and the whole of the 18th century is equally scanty. Several of the Qudshanis patriarchs who succeeded Shemʿon X corresponded with the Vatican, but the surviving correspondence does not enable individual patriarchs to be distinguished. The following list of 17th- and 18th-century Qudshanis patriarchs has conventionally been adopted, most recently by Fiey and (provisionally) by Wilmshurst: Shemʿon XI (1638–56), Shemʿon XII (1656–62), Shemʿon XIII Denha (1662–1700), Shemʿon XIV Shlemun (1700–40), Shemʿon XVI Mikhail Mukhtas (1740–80), and Shemʿon XVI Yohannan (1780–1820).

These names and reign-dates were first given towards the end of the 19th century by the Anglican missionary William Ainger Wigram. A recently discovered list of Qudshanis patriarchs compiled after the First World War by the bishop Eliya of Alqosh, however, gives a completely different set of dates: Shemʿon X (1600–39); Shemʿon XI (1639–53); Shemʿon XII (1653–92); Shemʿon XIII Denha (1692–1700); and Shemʿon XIV Shlemun (1700–17).

=== Catholic ===
In 1681 a Catholic line of patriarchs who took the name Joseph was founded at Amid (Diyarbakr). The Patriarch of this church were: Joseph I (1681–95); Joseph II (1696–1712); Joseph III (1713–57); Joseph IV (patriarch, 1757–80; patriarchal administrator, 1781–96); and Joseph V (1804–28). Strictly speaking, Augustine Hindi, who styled himself Joseph V, was merely the patriarchal administrator of the Amid and Mosul patriarchates, but he liked to think of himself as a patriarch and the Vatican found it politic to indulge him in this fantasy.

== Patriarchal succession, 19th to 21st centuries ==
There were three Qudshanis patriarchs in the decades leading up to the First World War: Shemʿon XVII Abraham (1820–61), Shemʿon XVIII Rubil (1861–1903), and Shemʿon XIX Benjamin (1903–18), who was consecrated at an uncanonically early age. Shemʿon XIX Benjamin (1903–18) was murdered in the village of Kohnashahr in the Salmas district in 1918, and was succeeded by the feeble Shemʿon XX Paul (1918–20). Paul died only two years after taking office. As there were no other qualified members of the patriarchal family available, he was succeeded by his twelve-year-old nephew Eshai, who was consecrated patriarch on 20 June 1920 under the name Shemʿon XXI Eshai.

Shemʿon XXI Eshai was murdered in the United States in 1975 and succeeded in 1976 by Dinkha IV Hnanya, the first non-Patriarch of the Church of the East to be appointed not by hereditary succession since the 15th century. Dinkha IV was succeeded by Gewargis III. Following the resignation of Gewargis III on 6 September 2021, he was succeeded by Awa IIl.

=== Catholic ===
The recognition of the Mosul patriarch Yohannan VIII Hormizd by the Vatican in 1830 marked the consolidation of all East Syriac Catholics into one unified Chaldean Catholic Church. Yohannan Hormizd died in 1838, and was succeeded by Joseph VI Audo (1848–1878), Nicholas I Zayʿa (1840–1847), Eliya Abulyonan (1879–1894), ʿAbdishoʿ V Khayyat (1895–1899), Emmanuel II Thomas (1900–1947), Joseph VII Ghanima (1947–1958), Paul II Cheikho (1958–1989) and Raphael I Bidawid (1989–2003). Patriarch Emmanuel III Delly was consecrated in 2003 and abdicated on 19 December 2012. He was succeeded by Louis Raphaël I Sako on 31 January 2013, who abdicated on March 10 2026 and was succeeded by Paul III Nona.

== Eliya line patriarchs ==
Since patriarchs of the Eliya line bore the same name (Syriac: ܐܠܝܐ / Elīyā) without using any pontifical numbers, later researchers were faced with several challenges, while trying to implement long standing historiographical practice of individual numeration. First attempts were made by early researchers during the 18th and 19th century, but their numeration was later (1931) revised by Eugène Tisserant, who also believed that during the period from 1558 to 1591 there were two successive Eliya patriarchs, numbered as VI (1558-1576) and VII (1576-1591), and in accordance with that he also assigned numbers (VIII-XIII) to their successors. That numeration was accepted and maintained by several other scholars. In 1966 and 1969, the issue was reexamined by Albert Lampart and William Macomber, who concluded that in the period from 1558 to 1591 there was only one patriarch (Eliya VI), and in accordance with that appropriate numbers (VII-XII) were reassigned to his successors. In 1999, same conclusion was reached by Heleen Murre-van den Berg, who presented additional evidence in favor of the new numeration. Revised numeration was accepted in modern scholarly works, with one notable exception.

Tisserant's numeration is still advocated by David Wilmshurst, who does acknowledge the existence of only one Eliya patriarch during the period from 1558 to 1591, but counts him as Eliya "VII" and his successors as "VIII" to "XIII", without having any existing patriarch designated as Eliya VI in his works, an anomaly noticed by other scholars, but left unexplained and uncorrected by Wilmshurst, even after the additional affirmation of proper numbering, by Samuel Burleson and Lucas van Rompay, in the Gorgias Encyclopedic Dictionary of the Syriac Heritage (2011).

== See also ==
- List of patriarchs of the Church of the East
- Patriarchal Province of Seleucia-Ctesiphon
- List of Chaldean Catholic patriarchs of Babylon
- List of patriarchs of the Assyrian Church of the East
- List of patriarchs of the Ancient Church of the East

== Sources ==
- Assemani, Giuseppe Luigi (1775). De catholicis seu patriarchis Chaldaeorum et Nestorianorum commentarius historico-chronologicus. Roma.
- Assemani, Giuseppe Luigi (2004). History of the Chaldean and Nestorian Patriarchs. Piscataway, New Jersey: Gorgias Press.
- Assemani, Giuseppe Simone (1719). Bibliotheca orientalis clementino-vaticana. Vol. 1. Roma.
- Baum, Wilhelm; Winkler, Dietmar W. (2003). The Church of the East: A Concise History. London-New York: Routledge-Curzon. ISBN 9781134430192.
- Baum, Wilhelm (2004). "Die sogenannten Nestorianer im Zeitalter der Osmanen (15. bis 19. Jahrhundert)". Zwischen Euphrat und Tigris: Österreichische Forschungen zum Alten Orient. Wien: LIT Verlag. pp. 229–246. ISBN 9783825882570.
- Baumer, Christoph (2006). The Church of the East: An Illustrated History of Assyrian Christianity. London-New York: Tauris. ISBN 9781845111151.
- Benjamin, Daniel D. (2008). The Patriarchs of the Church of the East. Piscataway: Gorgias Press. ISBN 9781463211059.
- Burleson, Samuel; Rompay, Lucas van (2011). "List of Patriarchs of the Main Syriac Churches in the Middle East". Gorgias Encyclopedic Dictionary of the Syriac Heritage. Piscataway, NJ: Gorgias Press. pp. 481–491.
- Borbone, Pier Giorgio (2014). "The Chaldean Business: The Beginnings of East Syriac Typography and the Profession of Faith of Patriarch Elias". Miscellanea Bibliothecae Apostolicae Vaticanae. 20: 211–258.
- Chabot, Jean-Baptiste (1902). Synodicon orientale ou recueil de synodes nestoriens (PDF). Paris: Imprimerie Nationale.
- Coakley, James F. (1999). "The Patriarchal List of the Church of the East". After Bardaisan: Studies on Continuity and Change in Syriac Christianity. Louvain: Peeters Publishers. pp. 65–84. ISBN 9789042907355.
- Coakley, James F. (2001). "Mar Elia Aboona and the History of the East Syrian Patriarchate". Oriens Christianus. 85: 119–138. ISBN 9783447042871.
- Fiey, Jean Maurice (1970). Jalons pour une histoire de l'Église en Iraq. Louvain: Secretariat du CSCO.
- Fiey, Jean Maurice (1979) [1963]. Communautés syriaques en Iran et Irak des origines à 1552. London: Variorum Reprints. ISBN 9780860780519.
- Fiey, Jean Maurice (1993). Pour un Oriens Christianus Novus: Répertoire des diocèses syriaques orientaux et occidentaux. Beirut: Orient-Institut. ISBN 9783515057189.
- Foster, John (1939). The Church of the T'ang Dynasty. London: Society for Promoting Christian Knowledge.
- Hage, Wolfgang (2007). Das Orientalische Christentum. Stuttgart: Kohlhammer Verlag. ISBN 9783170176683.
- Jakob, Joachim (2014). Ostsyrische Christen und Kurden im Osmanischen Reich des 19. und frühen 20. Jahrhunderts. Münster: LIT Verlag. ISBN 9783643506160.
- Lampart, Albert (1966). Ein Märtyrer der Union mit Rom: Joseph I. 1681-1696, Patriarch der Chaldäer. Köln: Benziger Verlag.
- Macomber, William F. (1969). "A Funeral Madraša on the Assassination of Mar Hnanišo". Mémorial Mgr Gabriel Khouri-Sarkis (1898-1968). Louvain: Imprimerie orientaliste. pp. 263–273.
- Meyendorff, John (1989). Imperial unity and Christian divisions: The Church 450-680 A.D. The Church in history. Vol. 2. Crestwood, NY: St. Vladimir's Seminary Press. ISBN 9780881410563.
- Mooken, Aprem (1983). The Chaldean Syrian Church of the East. Delhi: National Council of Churches in India.
- Murre van den Berg, Heleen H. L. (1999). "The Patriarchs of the Church of the East from the Fifteenth to Eighteenth Centuries" (PDF). Hugoye: Journal of Syriac Studies. 2 (2): 235–264. doi:10.31826/hug-2010-020119. S2CID 212688640.
- Stewart, John (1928). Nestorian Missionary Enterprise: A Church on Fire. Edinburgh: T. & T. Clark.
- Tfinkdji, Joseph (1914). "L' église chaldéenne catholique autrefois et aujourd'hui". Annuaire Pontifical Catholique. 17: 449–525.
- Tisserant, Eugène (1931). "L'Église nestorienne". Dictionnaire de théologie catholique. Vol. 11. Paris: Letouzey et Ané. pp. 157–323.
- Vine, Aubrey R. (1937). The Nestorian Churches. London: Independent Press. ISBN 9780404161880.
- Vosté, Jacques Marie (1930). "Les inscriptions de Rabban Hormizd et de N.-D. des Semences près d'Alqoš (Iraq)". Le Muséon. 43: 263–316.
- Vosté, Jacques Marie (1931). "Mar Iohannan Soulaqa, premier Patriarche des Chaldéens, martyr de l'union avec Rome (†1555)". Angelicum. 8: 187–234.
- Wigram, William Ainger (1910). An Introduction to the History of the Assyrian Church or The Church of the Sassanid Persian Empire 100-640 A.D. London: Society for Promoting Christian Knowledge. ISBN 9780837080789.
- Wilmshurst, David (2000). The Ecclesiastical Organisation of the Church of the East, 1318–1913. Louvain: Peeters Publishers. ISBN 9789042908765.
- Wilmshurst, David (2011). The Martyred Church: A History of the Church of the East. London: East & West Publishing Limited. ISBN 9781907318047.
- Wilmshurst, David (2019). "The Patriarchs of the Church of the East". The Syriac World. London: Routledge. pp. 799–805. ISBN 9781138899018.
- Walker, Williston (1985) [1918]. A History of the Christian Church. New York: Scribner. ISBN 9780684184173.
- Zora, Subhi (1994). "Some Outstanding Events in the History of the Chaldean Christians of the East (1551-1992)". VI Symposium Syriacum 1992. Roma: Pontificium institutum studiorum orientalium. pp. 347–359. ISBN 9788872103050.
