= David of Basra =

Christian bishop

Mar David of Basra Metropolitan
- Metropolitan of Basra, Bishop of India
- Diocese: India

Orders
- Ordination: by Shahlufa

David of Basra, sometimes rendered Dudi of Basra or David of Charax, was a 3rd- and 4th-century CE Christian metropolitan bishop who undertook missionary work in India around the year 300 (295 in some sources). He is among the earliest documented Christian missionaries in India, perhaps later only than the apostle Thomas, who may have visited India in the 1st century, though sources for the period are fragmentary and sometimes confused.

== Sources ==
The account of David's mission comes from an originally Syriac-language source that appears in the Arabic-language Chronicle of Seert, a history of the Nestorian Church. The Chronicle was compiled some time after the 9th century from a number of Syriac sources, and constitutes a major early source on the history of eastern Christianity. The original document was also translated by the Assyrian historian Alphonse Mingana in his Woodbrooke Studies collection of early Christian Documents in Syriac, Arabic, and Garshuni. It states that, during the patriarchate of Shahlupa and Papa, David visited and travelled throughout India, rather than settling there, and that he won converts to the Christian church.

Alphonse Mingana quotes from the Chronicles of Seert in his book, Hand Book of Source Materials for Student of Church History:

During the Patriarchate of Shahlufa and Papa, Dudi (David), Bishop of Basra, Persia (291 - 325) and an eminent physician, renounced his bishopric and came to India and preached to many people.

Historians have suggested that David's mission may have targeted communities in Southern India, on the assumption that an existing church there - either descended from the missionary work of the apostle Thomas, or founded by migrant Christians from elsewhere in the region - was in difficulties and required support.

== Mission context ==
Some sources describe David as an Arab; others characterize him as a Persian doctor. He came from the Sassanid empire, then a young and expanding polity under the rule of Narseh. Researchers have argued that David's mission should be seen in the context of that empire's expansionist political activities. Though David's mission indicates the extension of the Persian church into India, the Seert chronicle is the only surviving reference to David's activities and there is no evidence that his mission led to the establishment of a lasting Indian church in contact with Christianity elsewhere in the region. Later evidence of a sustained Christian church on the subcontinent dates instead to at least 50 years after David's mission, with the somewhat contradictory reports of a Christian settlement on the Malabar coast led by the Syrian merchant Thomas of Cana. This settlement is dated in some sources to around 350 CE, but in others is attributed to the 8th century. Later in the 4th century, Byzantine sources attest to the dispatch, under Emperor Constantius, of one Theophilus as a missionary to India after 354. David's mission was, though, an early sign of the nascent role of the diocese of Basra as a hub of missionary activity extending into southern Asia.

== See also ==
- Christianity in India

== Sources ==
- Baum, Wilhelm; Winkler, Dietmar W. (2003). The Church of the East: A Concise History. London-New York: Routledge-Curzon. ISBN 9781134430192.
- Wilmshurst, David (2000). The Ecclesiastical Organisation of the Church of the East, 1318–1913. Louvain: Peeters Publishers. ISBN 9789042908765.
