= Abris =

Abris, also called Abres, Abrosius and Abrisius, was a legendary Bishop of Seleucia-Ctesiphon in Persia, who is conventionally said to have sat from 121–137. He is said to have been from the family of Saint Joseph, the adoptive father of Jesus.

== Sources ==
Brief accounts of the life of Abris are given in the Ecclesiastical Chronicle of the Syriac Orthodox writer Bar Hebraeus (floruit 1280) and in the ecclesiastical histories of the Nestorian writers Mari (twelfth-century), ʿAmr (fourteenth-century) and Sliba (fourteenth-century). Abris is also mentioned in the Chronicle of Erbil, a text whose authenticity and reliability have been hotly disputed.

Although Abris is included in traditional lists of primates of the Church of the East, his existence has been doubted by some scholars like J. M. Fiey, a twentieth-century scholars of the Church of the East. In Fiey's view, Abris was one of several fictitious bishops of Seleucia-Ctesiphon whose lives were concocted in the sixth century to bridge the gap between the late third century bishop Papa, the first historically attested bishop of Seleucia-Ctesiphon, and the apostle Mari, the legendary founder of Christianity in Persia.

== Life of Abris ==
The following account of the life of Abris is given by the twelfth-century Nestorian writer Mari:

Abris, a Hebrew, from the family of Joseph the carpenter, the husband of our Virgin Lady, was chosen by Simon, son of Cleophas, bishop of Jerusalem. He was renowned for his continence and probity. It is said that after the death of the apostle Mar Mari the people disagreed over who should occupy his throne; and after they asked God in prayer to choose the worthiest man among them, several holy men saw in a dream a man urging them to choose Abris, but they did not know who he was. Then the vision was repeated, and they learned that he was about to enter the church to seek a blessing. When they saw him, they understood. They admitted him to all the orders of the priesthood at once, and sent him into the East. He was a man of exemplary virtue, charitable towards the needy and the poor, prone to good deeds and repelled by the way of the world. He only ordained those who were as chaste as he himself. He passed over to the kingdom of peace after leading the church for sixteen years.

The following account of the life of Abris is given by the thirteenth-century Jacobite historian Bar Hebraeus, who used two different spellings of his name (Abrosius and Abrisius) within a single paragraph. Bar Hebraeus is normally dependent on Mari for his information, but in the case of Abris has clearly derived some of his account from another source:

After Mari, his disciple Abrosius. His master Mari had sent him to Antioch, to visit the brethren there and to bring him back news of them. After the death of the blessed Mari the faithful of the East sent to Antioch and asked to be given a bishop. And the disciples of that place laid hands upon Abrosius and sent him back to occupy the throne of his master. There he ruled the faithful for seventeen years until his death. Some say that the place of his burial is unknown, but in fact he was buried in the church of Seleucia. This Abrisius is said to have been from the family of Joseph the carpenter, the father of James and Jesus.

== See also ==
- List of patriarchs of the Church of the East
- Patriarchs of the Church of the East

== Notes ==
Church of the East titles
Preceded by Mari (c. 87–c. 120)	Patriarch of the East (121–137)	Succeeded by Abraham (159–171)
