= Ahha =

5th-century bishop of Seleucia-Ctesiphon

- Grand Metropolitan and Primate of the East
- Church: Church of the East
- See: Seleucia-Ctesiphon
- Installed: 410
- Term ended: 414
- Predecessor: Isaac
- Successor: Yahballaha I

Mar Ahha or Ahai (Ancient Greek: Ἀχαιός, romanized: Achaeus) was bishop of Seleucia-Ctesiphon, grand metropolitan and primate of the Church of the East from 410 to 414. He is included in the traditional list of patriarchs of the Church of the East.

== Biography ==
The following account of Ahha's reign is given by Bar Hebraeus:

After Isaac, Ahai. His name derives from 'brotherhood', and he was so called because in his homilies and exhortations he frequently called his people his brothers. Just as today the chanters say 'My loved ones' or, when using the plural, some say 'My brothers', he used to take over that habit for the singular, and say 'My brother'. In Greek he is called Achaeus. He was a man of outstanding virtue and learning, given to fasting and oratory, and hospitable, who led a monastic life throughout his catholicate. After fulfilling his office for seven years he departed to his Lord and was buried at Seleucia.

A slightly longer and more circumstantial account is given by Mari:

Ahai. The leadership fell to this man by the common consent of the faithful. It was his custom to eat only bread and vegetables, cooked and in small quantities, and only just to taste it, so that he preserved a perpetual fast. Before he assumed his patriarchal responsibilities he made a pilgrimage to see the monuments of the martyrs who suffered for Christ under Shapur, and wrote their acts, and edited an entire volume on their deeds and why each one was martyred. He also wrote a history of Mar ʿAbda. He died after fulfilling his office for seven years and a few months. In his time the relics of Stephen the martyr were found and displayed in Jerusalem. Hormizd also accepted baptism, and built churches and protected the Christians. He built a very large church in the place where the bones of Stephen lay, in which miracles were performed. The times thus turned favourable for Ahai. He was buried in al-Madaïn [Seleucia-Ctesiphon].

== Sources ==
Brief accounts of Ahha's reign are given in the Ecclesiastical Chronicle of the Jacobite writer Bar Hebraeus (floruit 1280) and in the ecclesiastical histories of the Nestorian writers Mari (twelfth-century), ʿAmr (fourteenth-century) and Sliba (fourteenth-century). In all these accounts he is anachronistically called 'catholicus', a term that was only applied to the primates of the Church of the East towards the end of the fifth century.

== See also ==
- List of patriarchs of the Church of the East

== Notes ==
Church of the East titles
Preceded by Isaac (399–410)	Catholicos-Patriarch of the East (410–414)	Succeeded by Yahballaha I (415–420)
