= Ahadabui =

Ahadabui (Classical Syriac: ܐܚܐ ܕܐܒܘܝ, romanized: ʾaḥā d-avūy, lit. 'Brother of the father') was a legendary primate of the Church of the East, who is conventionally believed to have sat from 204 to 220.

== Sources ==
Brief accounts of the life of Ahadabui are given in the Ecclesiastical Chronicle of the Jacobite writer Bar Hebraeus (floruit 1280) and in the ecclesiastical histories of the Nestorian writers Mari (twelfth-century), ʿAmr (fourteenth-century) and Sliba (fourteenth-century). These accounts differ slightly, and these minor differences are of significance for scholars interested in tracing the various stages in the development of the legend.

Although Ahadabui is included in traditional lists of primates of the Church of the East, his existence has been doubted by J. M. Fiey, one of the most eminent twentieth-century scholars of the Church of the East. In Fiey's view, Ahadabui was one of several fictitious bishops of Seleucia-Ctesiphon whose lives were concocted in the sixth century to bridge the gap between the late third century bishop Papa, the first historically attested bishop of Seleucia-Ctesiphon, and the apostle Mari, the legendary founder of Christianity in Persia.

== Life ==
The following account of the life of Ahadabui is given by Bar Hebraeus:

After Yaʿqob, Ahadabui. He was given this name because of his striking similarity to his father. Shortly before he died Yaʿqob instructed two of his disciples, Ahadabui and Qamishoʿ, to go to Antioch, so that the patriarch of Antioch could consecrate whichever of them he chose and send him back. They did so, and when they both arrived in Antioch they were lodged in the house of a certain believer. But they were shortly afterwards denounced to the governor of Antioch as Persian spies, and were imprisoned in the house in which they were staying. Ahadabui was able to flee to Jerusalem, but Qamishoʿ and his host were arrested and crucified as spies. When the patriarch of Antioch heard that Ahadabui was hiding in Jerusalem, he sent letters to the bishops of that region, asking them to lay hands on him and send him into the East. They did so, and sent him to Seleucia. Thereafter the Western bishops allowed the Eastern bishops to elect and consecrate a new leader after the death of the old one without him needing to go to Antioch, and wrote them a letter to this effect, that the grand metropolitan of the East might be proclaimed catholicus and patriarch; although the patriarch of Antioch was greatly displeased with the whole idea. Ahadabui departed to the Lord after fulfilling his office for fifteen years, and was buried in the church of Seleucia.

== See also ==
- List of patriarchs of the Church of the East

== Notes ==
Church of the East titles
| Preceded by Yaʿqob I (c.190) | Patriarch of the East; Bishop of Seleucia-Ctesiphon (204–220) | Succeeded by Shahlufa (220–224) |
