= Mana of Seleucia-Ctesiphon =

Primate of the Church of the East in 420

Maʿna served briefly as bishop of Seleucia-Ctesiphon, grand metropolitan and primate of the Church of the East in 420. Like several other early bishops of Seleucia-Ctesiphon, he is included in the traditional list of patriarchs of the Church of the East.

== Sources ==
Brief accounts of Maʿna's episcopate are given in the Ecclesiastical Chronicle of the Jacobite writer Bar Hebraeus (floruit 1280) and in the ecclesiastical histories of the Nestorian writers Mari (twelfth-century), Amr (fourteenth-century) and Sliba (fourteenth-century). His life is also covered in the ninth-century Chronicle of Seert. In all these accounts he is anachronistically called 'catholicus', a term that was only applied to the primates of the Church of the East in the fifth century.

The account of Maʿna's life given by Bar Hebraeus is worthless, as Bar Hebraeus confused him with the late-fifth-century metropolitan Maʿna of Fars, an associate of Bar Sawma of Nisibis and a fierce proponent of Nestorianism.

Modern assessments of his reign can be found in Wigram's Introduction to the History of the Assyrian Church and David Wilmshurst's The Martyred Church.

== Maʿna's episcopate ==
The following account of Maʿna's episcopate is given in the Chronicle of Seert:

The Christians needed to elect a successor to Yahballaha. Maʿna, metropolitan of Fars, knew Persian and Syriac. He had studied at Edessa and had translated several books from Syrian into Persian. Yazdgird knew him, as he had been introduced to him with Yahballaha. The Christians asked Mirshabur, the head of the militia, to persuade Yazdgird to appoint Maʿna, and they offered him a sum of money to achieve this aim. Mirshabur helped them. He asked for an audience with the king and told him, 'Maʿna is a Persian, and capable of serving you. Let him be elected catholicus.' The Christians, happy with this result, hoped to see the restoration of the churches and the end of the persecution. But their hope, as the prophet Isaiah says, was soon dashed. One day, when Maʿna presented himself before Yazdgird, accompanied by several fathers, the king fixed them with glaring eyes. They realised that he was still seeking a pretext for persecuting them, which he found in the conduct of the priest Hosea which we described earlier. Then the king said, 'Caesar is the absolute ruler of his kingdom, and can do there whatever he pleases. I am also the master of my realm, and will do here as I choose.’ The king repeated these words twice. A priest of Seleucia named Narsai then replied on behalf of the catholicus, and said to the king, 'Sire, Caesar may insist that taxes and dues should be paid within his realm, and he can also kill his enemies, but he has no power to force his subjects to abandon their religion. There are a large number of Jews, pagans and heretics in his empire, but he does not force them to change their beliefs.' The king was angered by these words, and his counsellors exclaimed that Narsaï deserved to be put to death for speaking to the king in such a tone. The catholicus then said, 'Narsaï has merely answered the king’s question, and has done nothing to deserve death.' But Yazdgird ordered the priest to be beheaded if he did not deny Christianity, and also ordered that the catholicus should be stripped of his robes of office and exiled to Fars, and should no longer be called catholicus either in public or in private. Hosea of Nisibis and Bata of Lashom tried to speak up for him, but the king forbade them to speak and had them removed. The magi worked diligently to try to reconvert the priest Narsaï to their religion. But he remained unshakeable in his faith, and was beheaded. The faithful buried him in the great church of Seleucia.

Maʿna returned to Fars. Yazdgird, learning that he was administering his diocese, could not tolerate this and ordered him to be thrown into prison. He was imprisoned for a while, but certain chiefs delivered him. Then it was forbidden for him to be called catholicus for the rest of his life and even after his death. He died in Fars. May he be pleasing to God!

== See also ==
- List of patriarchs of the Church of the East

== Notes ==
Church of the East titles
Preceded by Yahballaha I (415–420)	Catholicos-Patriarch of the East (420)	Succeeded by Farbokht (421)
