= Gregentios =

Archbishop of Zafar, Himyar

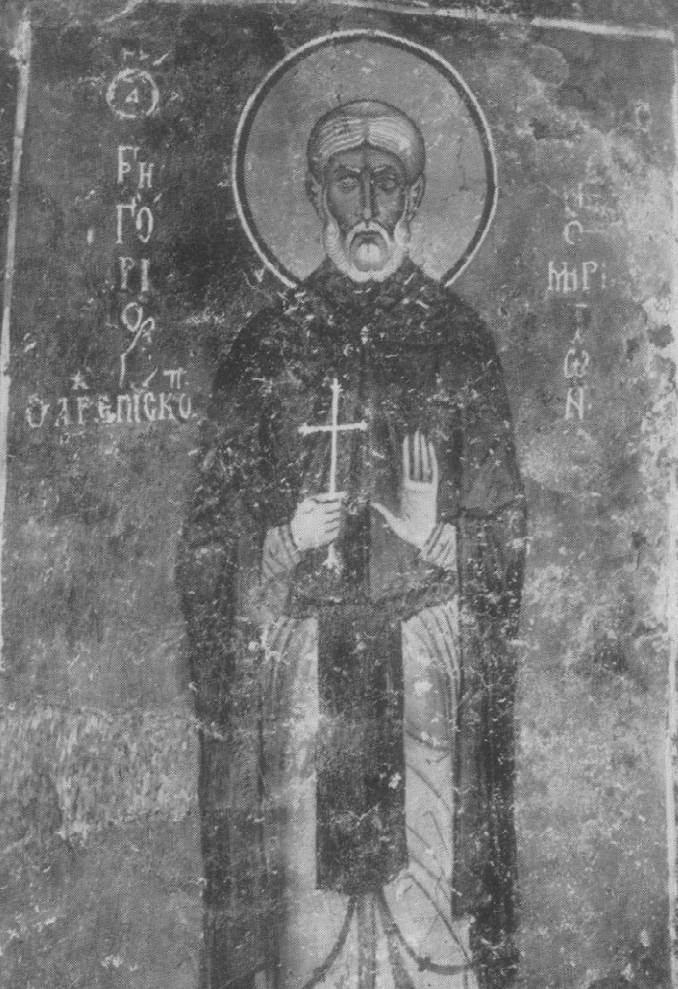
The only depiction of Gregentios from the Byzantine period: a 12th-century fresco in a Cypriot church

Gregentios (Greek: Γρηγέντιος) was the purported archbishop of Ẓafār, the capital of the kingdom of Ḥimyar, in the mid-6th century, according to a hagiographical dossier compiled in the 10th century. This compilation is essentially legendary and fictitious, although a few parts of it are of historical value. Written in Greek, it survives also in a Slavonic translation. The three works in the dossier are conventionally known as the Bios (Life), Nomoi (Laws) and Dialexis (Debate), respectively a biography of Gregentios (sometimes called the Life of Saint Gregentios), the laws he wrote for the kingdom and a debate he had with a Jew. The whole dossier is sometimes known as the Acts of Gregentios.

== Name ==
The name Gregentios is unknown apart from the Bios and related texts. According to the Bios, he received his name from a local holy man. Several later scribes, encountering an unheard of name, changed it to Gregorios (Gregory). This is the name that appears in all the Slavonic versions, as well as an Arabic translation of the Dialexis. It also appears in the fresco depicting Gregentios in the monastery of Koutsovendis on Cyprus, painted between 1110 and 1118. Other scribal emendations are Gregentinos and Rhegentios.

The name has a Latin ending, which may indicate a western origin for the name, but such suffixes had entered vernacular Greek by the time the Bios was written. The name may be derived from Agrigentius, "man from Agrigento", or from a combination of the name Gregory with either Agrigentius or the name of Saint Vincentius. The biography of Gregory of Agrigento was a major source used by the author of the Bios, and an itinerary of Vincentius may also have been used.

The only known persons named after Gregentios are two 19th-century monks of Mount Athos. The first was the archimandrite of Vatopedi in April 1842 and the second a monk of the Skete of Saint Anne who died in 1879 aged 69. Both monastic communities had copies of the Bios and Dialexis of Gregentios.

== Overview ==
The main source for Gregentios is a dossier of three texts, which may have originally circulated independently:

1. The Bios (or the Vita Sanctii Gregentii, that is, the Life of Saint Gregentios)
2. The Nomoi
3. The Dialexis (or Dialogus)

The Bios, which Jean-Marie Sansterre called a "hagiographical romance", is divided into nine chapters. While the first eight are vague in their chronology and geography, the ninth draws on superior historical sources and contains more precise details. The early part, which includes an Avar raid on his hometown, may also reflect authentic conditions in the northern Balkans during the later 6th century. The Bios was completed either at Constantinople in the 10th century or in Rome in the 9th century.

The Nomoi and Dialexis are later additions. The whole collection, which presents as a unity, was not brought together before the 10th century. The Nomoi may contain some authentic information, since it shares characteristics with legal inscriptions from pre-Islamic South Arabia. The Dialexis, which is a debate between Gregentios and a Jew named Herban, was the most popular part of the work and circulated independently into modern times.

== Bios ==
=== Early life in Avaria ===
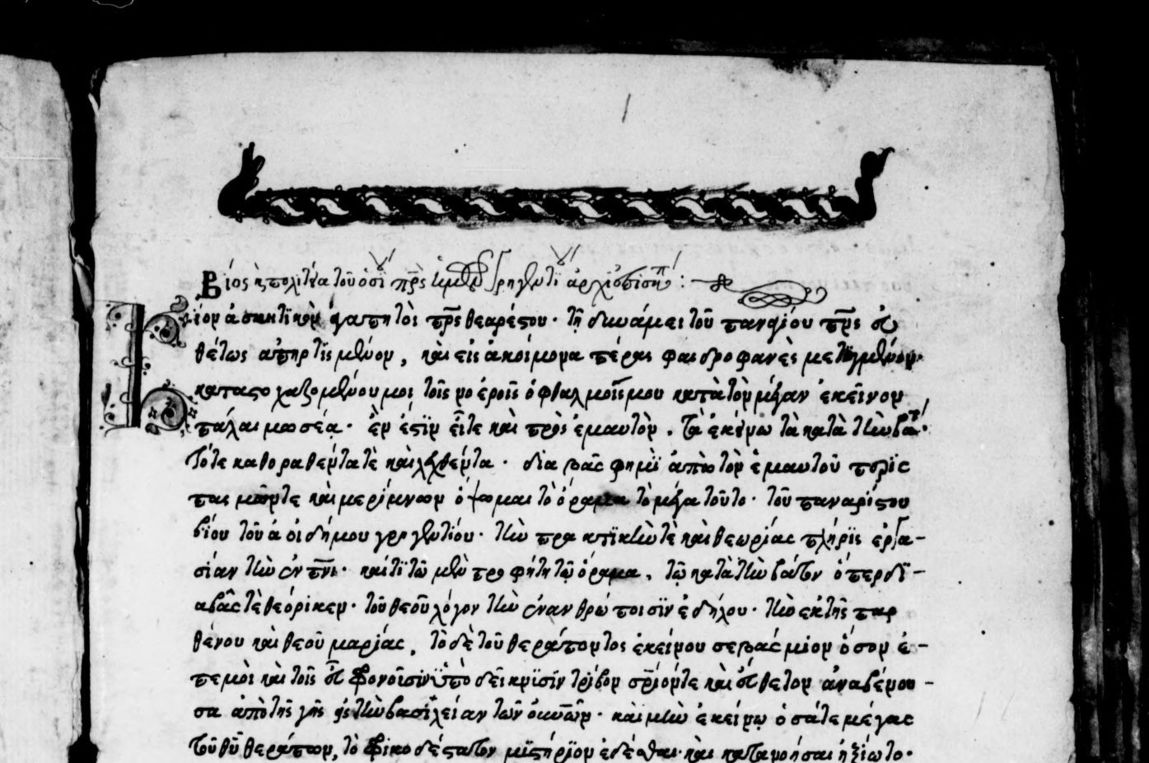
The start of the Bios of Gregentios, from a copy made in 1180 and now in Saint Catherine's Monastery, Sinai

According to his Bios, Gregentios was born on 6 December in the late 5th century in the town of Lyplianes (Ljubljana) in the land of the Avars. His father was named Agapios and his mother Eusebia. At his baptism, he was named after a sage who lived on a nearby mountain. His schooling begins at the age of seven. At the age of ten, he is pushed into a river by a deer. Miraculously saved from drowning, he retires to the desert, where he receives instruction and prophecies about his future from a holy man.

When his mother dies, Gregentios is placed in the custody of the married but childless priest who baptised him. During a barbarian invasion, the townspeople flee to the fortress of Korada. Gregentios, who was in the vineyards at the time, manages to sneak in through the Rhomanesios gate while the fortress is besieged. After the barbarians retreat, both Gregentios and his foster mother have prophetic dreams about him. At the urging of a certain Sergios, his foster mother tells her dream to an elder named Niketas, who interprets it as saying that Gregentios will one day convert a fourfold people.

=== Travels ===
Gregentios next traveled extensively in northern and central Italy and Sicily before sailing to Alexandria in Egypt. The Bios presents him as travelling from Lyplianes to Moryne (Murano), Antenora (Padua) and Agrigento, then by boat to Pavia, then to Milan and Carthage, then by foot to Rome, then to Augustopolis (either Augusta or Koper) and finally Alexandria. In its order, timing and means of travel, this itinerary is absurd.

==== Padania and Sicily ====
Gregentios first departs with the holy man from the desert. They reach Moryne in a single day. There they stay with a man named Sabbatios, where a holy fool named Peter informs Gregentios that his foster parents are searching for him. The holy man and Gregentios leave Moryne after the local bishop learns of the latter's spiritual gifts. In Antenora, they stay in the house of Theodoretos, while the bishop of Moryne searches for him. Bishop Eulogios of Antenora makes Gregentios a deacon and lector. A holy woman named Theodora informs him again of his foster parents' search.

With the holy man, Gregentios moves on to Agrigento, leaving the bishop of Antenora also to send searchers after him. He is hosted by the priest Stephanos in the church of the Mother of God outside the walls. He visits the grave of the hermit Eirene, who appears to him and talks to him. He visits two churches in the city, and a woman preaching to a crowd from a balcony predicts that he will go to Egypt and Ḥimyar. The holy man then appears and whisks Gregentios away to Milan. Going by boat, they pass Rome on the way.

In Milan, Gregentios stays with one Niketas, while the holy man moves on to Largention (Piacenza). He visits the grave of Saint Ambrose and begins reading his works. He takes on as a disciple a boy of fourteen named Leon, who later becomes governor of Melike (either Ravenna or the land of the Melingoi) and is assassinated. Gregentios has a vision of the underworld in which he sees Leon among those who died before their time awaiting the Last Judgement. The holy man then returns and the two travel to Carthage, where they stay with one Constantine.

==== Carthage and Rome ====
In Carthage, Gregentios meets a woman named Philothea who is regarded as a mute who only barks and sighs. The holy man reveals that this is merely a gift God gave her to ward off a man who tried to seduce her. She speaks to Gregentios clearly and lucidly. During his time in Carthage, he befriends a young man named George and they visit a church dedicated to Saint Anastasia. There, a holy woman identifies Gregentios by name and birthplace. When George asks for the same treatment, she reproaches and names the women he has been sinning with. Another young man, a Thracian named Pothetos, asks Gregentios for spiritual advice. Gregentios writes sixteen homilies that make Pothetos regret his marriage, but Gregentios convinces him to go home to his wife.

From Carthage, the holy man takes Gregentios to Rome. On the way, he has a vision of the devil in the valley of Patherolymna. In Rome, they stay with a man named Benedict near the Great Portico. He owns a slave named Elizabeth, who is sexually abused by a demon every night. After Gregentios writes a formula on a piece of papyrus and gives it to her, she is freed from the demon.

One day, Gregentios is visited by Saint Peter, who had been absent from his grave when Gregentios visited it, for he had gone to give comfort to the persecuted Christians of Negra (Najrān). He tells Gregentios that the time has not yet come for the holy man's identity to be revealed. Later, a woman identifies Gregentios by name as the prophet of the Ḥimyarites. He is also identified by name by the monk Abramios. At the request of a beggar named Zacharias, he heals the eye of a youth named Basil. In ecstasy at the tomb of Saint Paul, he sees a vision of the saint bringing him a pallium.

Gregentios visits a church dedicated to Saint Boniface, whose feast day he will come to share. He meets a fool for Christ named John who throws stones at passersby. He visits a hermit named Michael, who sends him on to a hermit named Artados, who lives atop a mountain beyond the Dry Lakes. Artados prophesies in detail about Gregentios' future in Egypt and Ḥimyar, where he will convert four peoples: pagans, Jews, Ḥimyarites and Maurousians. After a stay of two days, Gregentios returns to Rome, where he meets Pope Felix IV (526–530). The holy man rejoins him and they go to Augustopolis.

==== Alexandria ====
In Augustopolis, Gregentios stays with a widow named Euphemia. In the market, he meets an Armenian from Artazat (Artaxata), who prophesies his future. After a few days, the holy man and Gregentios board a ship from Leukas for Alexandria. There, Gregentios is greeted by name by a female slave, whose prophesies how the patriarch will call him to be an archbishop. He stays in the house of one Leontios. In Alexandria, he visits a monastery led by a eunuch-abbot named Epiphanios. His prayers chase away a devil who throws stones at a monk named Kosmas. A woman named Archontia greets him by name.

=== Bishop in South Arabia ===
The last part of the Bios "contains the only clear historical information scattered through the whole" of the Gregentios materials.

In 523, the Ḥimyarite king Dhū Nuwās massacres the Christians of Najrān and its leader, Arethas. The Emperor Justin I asks the Ethiopian (Aksumite) king Elesboam (Caleb) to lead an expedition against Dhū Nuwās. Elesboam writes to the patriarch of Alexandria, Proterios, for a bishop to evangelize the Ḥimyarites. (The actual patriarch at this time was Timothy IV.) Saint Mark informs Proterios of Gregentios in a dream. The patriarch consecrates Gregentios as bishop and send him back with the Ethiopian envoys. This takes place after the successful Ethiopian conquest of Ḥimyar (525).

In Ethiopia, Gregentios stays for a time in the capital, Amlem (Aksum), before crossing the sea to Medekion (Maddaban) and then heading to Taphar (Ẓafār) and finally Najrān, where he meets the king. He consecrates the churches that the kings has built and installs priests in them at Najrān, Ẓafār, Akana (Bi'r Ali), Atarph (Ẓufār), Legmia (Laḥj), Azaki (Aden) and Iouze (Mawzaʿ).

The Bios describes Elesboam's retirement to a monastery and the miraculous invocation of his name. Gregentios threatens the Ḥimyarites with the death penalty for all those who do not convert, whereupon the hole country becomes Christian. The Dialexis is interposed here, and the end of the Bios follows.

Gregentios remains in Ḥimyar for thirty years, assisting Elesboam's appointed viceroy, Abraha, in building churches. Shortly after Abraha dies and is succeeded by his son Seridos (Masrūq), Gregentios dies on 19 December. He is buried in the cathedral. He is commemorated in the Synaxarion of Constantinople on 19 December.

== Nomoi ==
=== Content ===
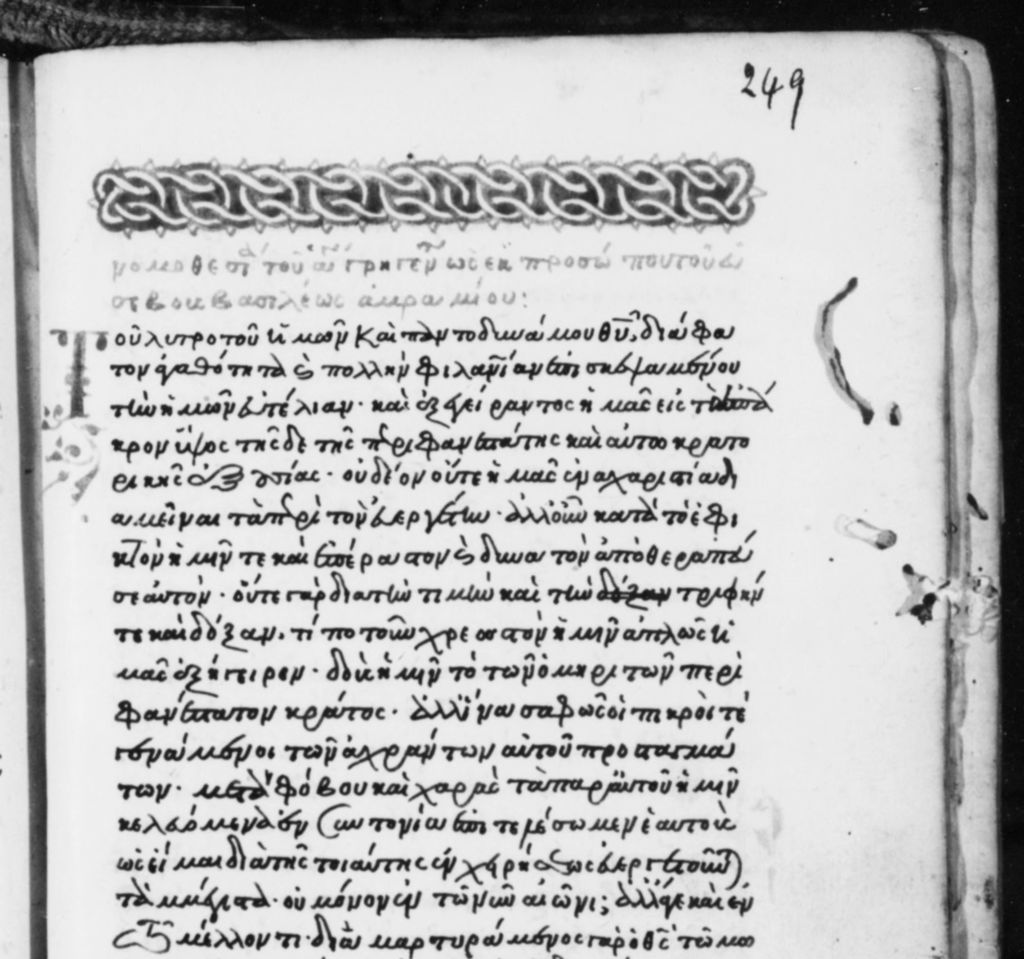
Start of the Nomoi in a manuscript copied in Gaza in 1487

The Nomoi ton Homeriton (Νόμοι των Όμηριτών, "Laws of the Homerites"), also known in Latin as Leges Homeritarum, is usually regarded as a fictional law code containing some amount of authentic pre-Islamic South Arabian material. The laws are not arranged thematically, but may be subsumed under eight headings: (1) morals, marriage and family; (2) slavery; (3) right of employment; (4) culture and social life; (5) cruelty against animals; (6) rental laws; (7) officeholders; and (8) miscellaneous. Within the last class are laws concerning sorcery, poisoning, perjury, theft, extrajudicial punishments, infringing ecclesiastical asylum, workhouses for criminals and prohibitions on begging. The Nomoi do not come near to being a comprehensive law code. There is, for example, no law of inheritance.

The Nomoi prescribes harsh punishments for transgressions, often mutilation, and mitigating factors are nowhere admitted. Its strong prohibitions of wife-beating and cruelty to animals stand out, however, since Byzantine law knew no restriction on the treatment of animals. The laws seem concerned strictly with an urban community like Najrān. Administration and taxation are governed in a clearly Byzantine manner. The prohibitions on dancing, singing, gambling and gaming may be taken from the canons of the Quinisext Council (691/692). On the whole, the influence of canon law is limited, but Christian theological justifications are provided for the laws. Although the Nomoi is a civil law code, it presents itself as having been promulgated by a supernatural force to the geitoniarchai (administrators of Najrān's 36 districts). It bears the unmistakable stamp of a Christian monk of a strong ascetic spirit. In the words of J. B. Bury, the laws "illustrate the kind of legislation at which the ecclesiastical spirit, unchecked, would have aimed."

=== Date and authorship ===
The authenticity of the Nomoi was first put in doubt by Cardinal Jean-Baptiste-François Pitra in 1864. He was followed by many, including Louis Duchesne, but in 1969 Nina Pigulevskaya defended a 6th-century origin. She thought the code was written in the Byzantine Empire and never actually came into force in Ḥimyar. Irfan Shahîd and A. K. Irvine have also defended the authenticity of the code. Garth Fowden considers that it contains some authentic material. It mentions a slave market at a place called Trikanos or Trikanon, a place not attested anywhere else.

Certain features of the Nomoi that would be unusual in 6th-century Byzantium have been ascribed to South Arabian influence. They may, however, reflect a later date of composition. Mutilation was an uncommon punishment in Byzantine law prior to Leo III's Ekloge ton nomon (741). One of the most unusual and cruel punishments in the Nomoi—suspending a convict upside down and smoking him to death with burning hay—is actually attested in an 8th-century Byzantine source (Nikephoros's Breviarium). Some prescriptions regarding marriage in the Nomoi became a part of Byzantine law during the reign Leo VI (886–912). Similarities between the Najrān of the Nomoi and Constantinople under the Macedonian dynasty suggest that the Nomoi was probably written at Constantinople in the 10th century. The Nomoi may be compared with other pseudepigraphal texts of supposed supernatural origin from Byzantium, such as the Didascalia Apostolorum and Letter of Christ Fallen from Heaven.

The earliest manuscript witness to the Nomoi, a copy made in 1180 on Cyprus, shows some Western influence in its terminology. It is probable that it was copied from a manuscript made shortly before in Crusader Syria. Some of its terminology does not appear in Greek again until the Assizes of Cyprus in the 14th century.

== Dialexis ==
The Dialexis purports to be a record written around 550 or 560 of a debate between Gregentios and a Jew named Herban that took place before the royal court of Ḥimyar around 520 or 530. The author does not claim to have been present or to have known Gregentios, but does claim to have had access to a record of the proceedings written at the time by the notary Palladios. The text, however, shows clear evidence of having been composed after the start of the controversies over monothelitism (7th century), iconoclasm (8th century) and the filioque clause, which only became a live controversy in the Byzantine Empire after 860.

== Letters ==
There is a treatise against the Azymites in the form of a letter that is ascribed to Gregentios in one manuscript. Given the issue it discusses, it can have no connection to the time in which Gregentios supposedly lived. In 1660, some "letters of Gregentios"—possibly the same treatise—were catalogued as part of the library of Denis Pétau that had been purchased after his death by Queen Christina of Sweden. There is no further record of these letters and they appear to be lost.

== Bibliography ==
- Bausi, Alessandro (2008). "Review of Life and Works of Saint Gregentios, Archbishop of Taphar". Aethiopica. 11: 262–266. doi:10.15460/aethiopica.11.1.170.
- Berger, Albrecht [in German], ed. (2006). Life and Works of Saint Gregentios, Archbishop of Taphar: Introduction, Critical Edition and Translation. Millennium Studies, 7. De Gruyter. doi:10.1515/9783110911060. ISBN 9783110911060.
- Bowersock, G. W. (2013). The Throne of Adulis: Red Sea Wars on the Eve of Islam. Oxford University Press. ISBN 978-0-19-973932-5.
- Christides, Vassilios (1972). "The Himyarite–Ethiopian War and the Ethiopian Occupation of South Arabia in the Acts of Gregentius (ca. 530 A.D.)". Annales d'Éthiopie. 9: 115–146. doi:10.3406/ethio.1972.896.
- Christides, Vassilios (2000). "The Martyrdom of Arethas and the Aftermath: History vs. Hagiography". Graeco-Arabica. 7–8: 51–92.
- Christides, Vassilios (2009). "Review of Life and Works of Saint Gregentios, Archbishop of Taphar". Collectanea Christiana Orientalia. 6: 458–464.
- Christides, Vassilios (2015). "The Himyarite Kingdom on the Eve of and After the Ethiopian Dominance in the Sixth Century AD in the Martyrdom of St. Arethas and His Companions and in the Acts of St. Gregentius". Journal for Semitics. 24 (2): 678–700. doi:10.25159/1013-8471/3475.
- Fiaccadori, Gianfranco (1991). "Gregentios". In Kazhdan, Alexander (ed.). The Oxford Dictionary of Byzantium. Oxford and New York: Oxford University Press. ISBN 0-19-504652-8.
- Fiaccadori, Gianfranco (2005). "Gregentius". In Siegbert Uhlig (ed.). Encyclopaedia Aethiopica. Vol. 2: D–Ha. Harrassowitz Verlag. pp. 889–891.
- Fiaccadori, Gianfranco (2006). "Gregentios in the Land of the Homerites". In Albrecht Berger (ed.). Life and Works of Saint Gregentios, Archbishop of Taphar: Introduction, Critical Edition and Translation. De Gruyter. pp. 48–82. doi:10.1515/9783110911060.48. ISBN 9783110911060.
- Fowden, Garth (1993). Empire to Commonwealth: Consequences of Monotheism in Late Antiquity. Princeton University Press.
- Hatke, George (2011). Africans in Arabia Felix: Aksumite Relations with Himyar in the Sixth Century C.E. (PhD diss.). Princeton University. ProQuest 3437755
- Insley, Sarah (2018). "Gregentius, Life of S.". In Oliver Nicholson (ed.). The Oxford Dictionary of Late Antiquity. Vol. 1: A–I. Oxford University Press. p. 683. ISBN 978-0-19-866277-8.
- Irvine, A. K.; Beeston, A. F. L. (1967). "Homicide in Pre-Islamic South Arabia". Bulletin of the School of Oriental and African Studies. 3 (2): 277–292. doi:10.1017/S0041977X00062194. JSTOR 610992. S2CID 154904442.
- Letsios, Dimitrios G. (1991). "Some Remarks on Reflections of Byzantine Foreign Policy in the Martyrdom of Arethas and the Acts of Gregentius". Graeco-Arabica. 4: 141–155.
- Lourié, Basil (2008). "Review of Life and Works of Saint Gregentios, Archbishop of Taphar". Scrinium. 4 (1): 446–449. doi:10.1163/18177565-90000200.
- Mango, Cyril; Hawkins, Ernest J. W. (1964). "Report on Field Work in Istanbul and Cyprus, 1962–1963". Dumbarton Oaks Papers. 18: 319–340. doi:10.2307/1291217. JSTOR 1291217.
- Radius, William Thomas (1939). The Discussion of St. Gregentius, Archbishop of Taphar, with the Jew Herban (PhD diss.). University of Michigan. ProQuest 301813058
- Shahîd, Irfan (1979). "Byzantium in South Arabia". Dumbarton Oaks Papers. 33: 23–94. doi:10.2307/1291433. JSTOR 1291433.
- Stevenson, Walter (2007). "Review of Life and Works of Saint Gregentios, Archbishop of Taphar". Bryn Mawr Classical Review. 9 (6): 1–4.
- Whitby, Michael (1988). The Emperor Maurice and His Historian: Theophylact Simocatta on Persian and Balkan Warfare. Clarendon Press.
