= Eliya VIII =

Patriarch of the Church of the East

Mar Eliya VIII
- Patriarch of the Church of the East
- Church: Church of the East
- Installed: 1617
- Term ended: 1660
- Predecessor: Eliya VII
- Successor: Eliya IX

Personal details
- Died: 18 June 1660
- Residence: Rabban Hormizd Monastery

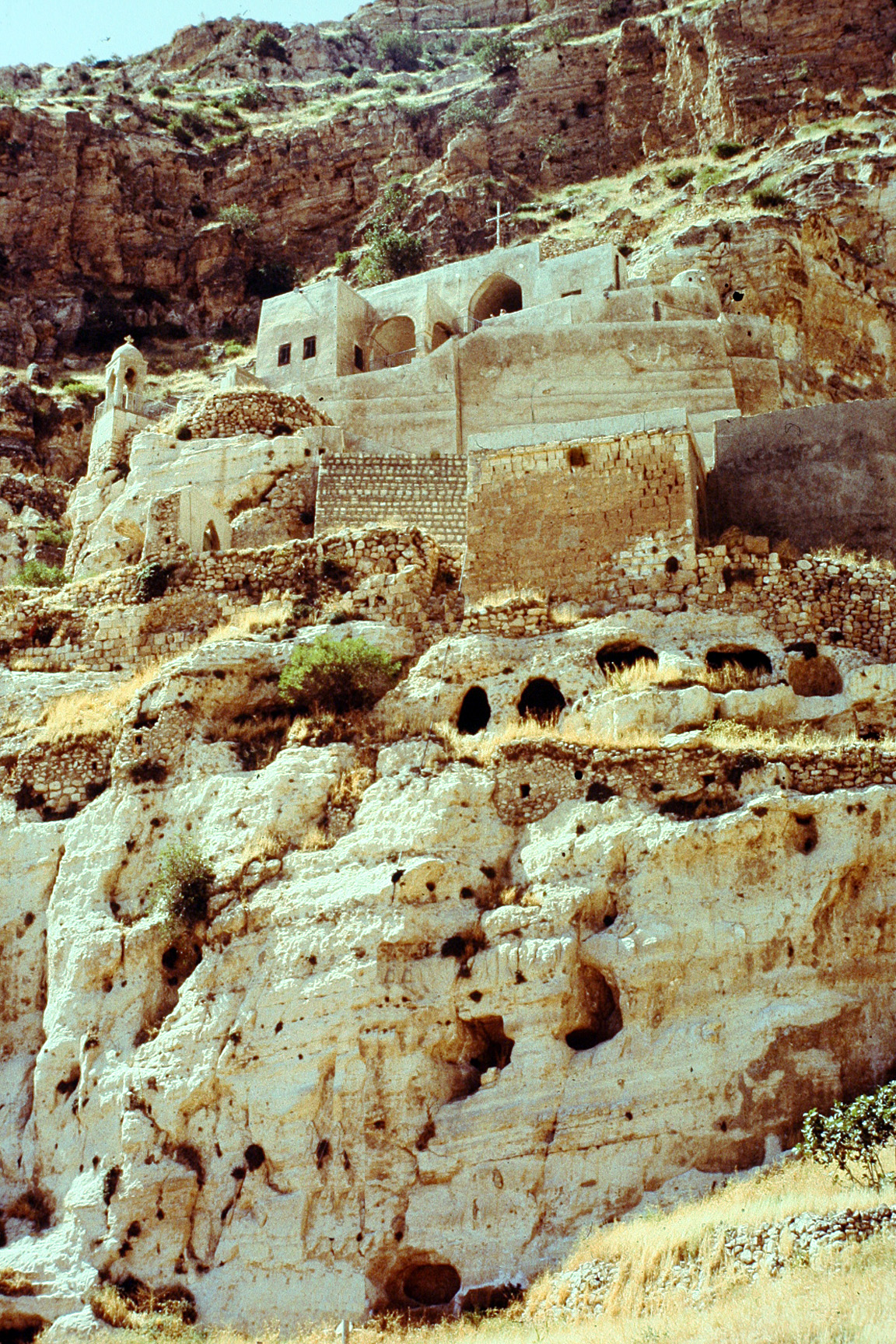
The ancient Rabban Hormizd Monastery, former residence of the Patriarchs of the Church of the East

Eliya VIII (Syriac: ܐܠܝܐ / Elīyā, d. 18 June 1660) was Patriarch of the Church of the East from 1617 to 1660, with residence in Rabban Hormizd Monastery, near Alqosh, in modern Iraq. On several occasions (1619, 1629, 1638, 1653) he was approached by representatives of the Catholic Church, but those contacts didn't led to any agreement. In older historiography, he was designated as Eliya VIII, but later renumbered as Eliya "IX" by some authors. After the resolution of several chronological questions, he was designated again as Eliya VIII, and that numeration is accepted in recent scholarly works.

== See also ==
- Patriarch of the Church of the East
- List of Patriarchs of the Church of the East
- Assyrian Church of the East

== Notes ==
Church of the East titles
Preceded by Eliya VII (1591–1617)	Catholicos-Patriarch of the Church of the East; Eliya line (Alqosh) (1617–1660)	Succeeded by Eliya IX (1660–1700)
