= Qayyoma =

Primate of the Church of the East, late fourth century

Qayyoma was bishop of Seleucia-Ctesiphon and primate of the Church of the East during the final decades of the fourth century. He is traditionally believed to have sat from 377 to 399, though these dates have been disputed by some modern scholars. Like several other early bishops of Seleucia-Ctesiphon, he is included in the traditional list of patriarchs of the Church of the East.

== Sources ==
Brief accounts of Qayyoma's episcopate are given in the Ecclesiastical Chronicle of the Jacobite writer Bar Hebraeus (floruit 1280) and in the ecclesiastical histories of the Nestorian writers Mari (twelfth-century), ʿAmr (fourteenth-century) and Sliba (fourteenth-century). His life is also covered in the Chronicle of Seert. In all these accounts he is anachronistically called 'catholicus', a term that was only applied to the primates of the Church of the East in the fifth century.

Modern assessments of his episcopate can be found in Wigram's Introduction to the History of the Assyrian Church and David Wilmshurst's The Martyred Church.

== Qayyoma's episcopate ==
The following account of Qayyoma's episcopate is given by Bar Hebraeus:

After Tamuza, Qayyoma. After the death of Tamuza, none of the bishops wanted to offer himself as leader of the Christians, since Bahram, an enemy of the Christians, had succeeded to the throne on the death of his father Shapur. Then Qayyoma devoted himself to God and his church. He was consecrated two years after the death of Tamuza. Five years after his consecration a peace was made between Arcadius, the emperor of the Greeks, and Yazdegerd, the king of the Persians, who had also persecuted the Christians. Marutha, bishop of Maiperqat, a wise man of admirable learning, was sent as an ambassador for this business, and on his arrival peace was restored for the Christians. Then Qayyoma gathered all the Eastern bishops in the presence of Marutha, and persuaded them to depose him as unfit for his office. 'I only accepted the office because I was compelled to do so, as none of you wanted to be in charge. Now, since God has taken pity on his church and restored peace, it is not reasonable that a man like me, rude and infirm, and incapable of steering the ship of the church properly, should remain its head.' The bishops refused to release him from his charge, but he urged them in the name of God to do so, and persuaded Marutha to force them to agree. And so, although they were saddened at his abdication, they consecrated a new catholicus, Isaac.

== See also ==
- List of patriarchs of the Church of the East

== Notes ==
Church of the East titles
Vacant Title last held by Tomarsa (363–371); Vacant (c. 371–377)	Catholicos-Patriarch of the Church of the East; Bishop of Seleucia-Ctesiphon (377–399)	Succeeded by Isaac (399–410)
