= Abraham of Kashkar =

Abraham of Kashkar may refer to:

- Abraham I (Church of the East)
- Abraham, companion of the martyrs Abda and Abdisho
- Abraham the Great of Kashkar
