= Isaac of Seleucia-Ctesiphon =

Primate of the Church of the East from 399 to 410

Mar Isaac
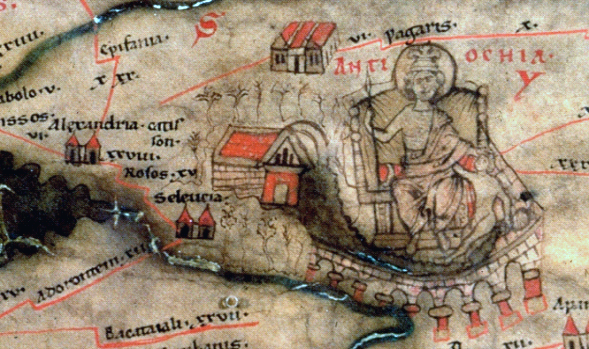
- Isaac portrayed in the Tabula Peutingeriana

Grand Metropolitan and Primate of Persia
- Born: 4th century Kashkar, Sassanid Empire
- Died: ca. 410; Seleucia, Sassanid Empire

Isaac or Mar Isaac was the Persian bishop of Seleucia-Ctesiphon, grand metropolitan and primate of the Church of the East from 399 to 410. He is included in the traditional list of patriarchs of the Church of the East.

== Sources ==
Brief accounts of Isaac's reign are given in the Ecclesiastical Chronicle of the Jacobite writer Bar Hebraeus (floruit 1280) and in the ecclesiastical histories of the Nestorian writers Mari (twelfth-century), ʿAmr (fourteenth-century) and Sliba (fourteenth-century). In all these accounts he is anachronistically called 'catholicus', a term that was only applied to the primates of the Church of the East towards the end of the fifth century.

== Isaac's reign ==
Isaac's reign was noteworthy for a Council held in Seleucia-Ctesiphon in 410, brokered by the Byzantine envoy Marutha of Maiperqat, at which the Church of the East accepted the decisions of the Council of Nicaea (325). The synod also recognised Isaac as 'grand metropolitan' and primate of the Church of the East, and organised the Persian dioceses into a number of Roman-style metropolitan provinces.

The following account of Isaac's reign is given by Bar Hebraeus:

After Qayyoma, Isaac. He was a native of Kashkar, a very noble and virtuous man, from the family of the catholicus Tuhma Tomarsa. After the bishops consecrated him, they enjoined him to behave as an obedient son to the elderly Qayyoma, and to do nothing without his advice and approval. Isaac did so. He showed great deference to Qayyoma, and fawned upon him until he died, after which he became the sole ruler of the church. In the year 671 of the Greeks [AD 350], in the time of Theodosius the Great, a synod of 150 bishops was gathered at Constantinople, in which Macedonius of Constantinople was deposed, who blasphemed against the Holy Spirit by asserting that he was a created being. Then Marutha of Maiperqat was again sent to Yazdegerd in the eleventh year of his reign, and used the occasion to inform the catholicus Isaac of the reason for this synod. And Isaac gathered together forty of his own bishops, who as vigilant guardians of the faith assented to the deposition of Macedonius. Marutha prescribed admirable canons for them, and taught the Easterners how discipline should most rightly be ordered. At length, after fulfilling his office for eleven years, Isaac died and was buried in Seleucia.

== See also ==
- Council of Seleucia-Ctesiphon
- List of patriarchs of the Church of the East

== Literature ==
- Abbeloos, J. B., and Lamy, T. J., Bar Hebraeus, Chronicon Ecclesiasticum (3 vols, Paris, 1877)
- Assemani, J. A., De Catholicis seu Patriarchis Chaldaeorum et Nestorianorum (Rome, 1775)
- Brooks, E. W., Eliae Metropolitae Nisibeni Opus Chronologicum (Rome, 1910)
- Chabot, Jean-Baptiste (1902). Synodicon orientale ou recueil de synodes nestoriens (PDF). Paris: Imprimerie Nationale.
- Gismondi, H., Maris, Amri, et Salibae: De Patriarchis Nestorianorum Commentaria I: Amri et Salibae Textus (Rome, 1896)
- Gismondi, H., Maris, Amri, et Salibae: De Patriarchis Nestorianorum Commentaria II: Maris textus arabicus et versio Latina (Rome, 1899)
- Meyendorff, John (1989). Imperial unity and Christian divisions: The Church 450-680 A.D. The Church in history. Vol. 2. Crestwood, NY: St. Vladimir's Seminary Press. ISBN 978-0-88-141056-3.

Church of the East titles
Preceded by Qayyoma (377–399)	Catholicos-Patriarch of the East (399–410)	Succeeded by Ahha (410–414)
