= Eliya X =

Mar Eliya X
- Patriarch of the Church of the East
- Church: Church of the East
- Installed: 1700
- Term ended: 1722
- Predecessor: Eliya IX
- Successor: Eliya XI

Personal details
- Died: 14 December 1722
- Residence: Rabban Hormizd Monastery

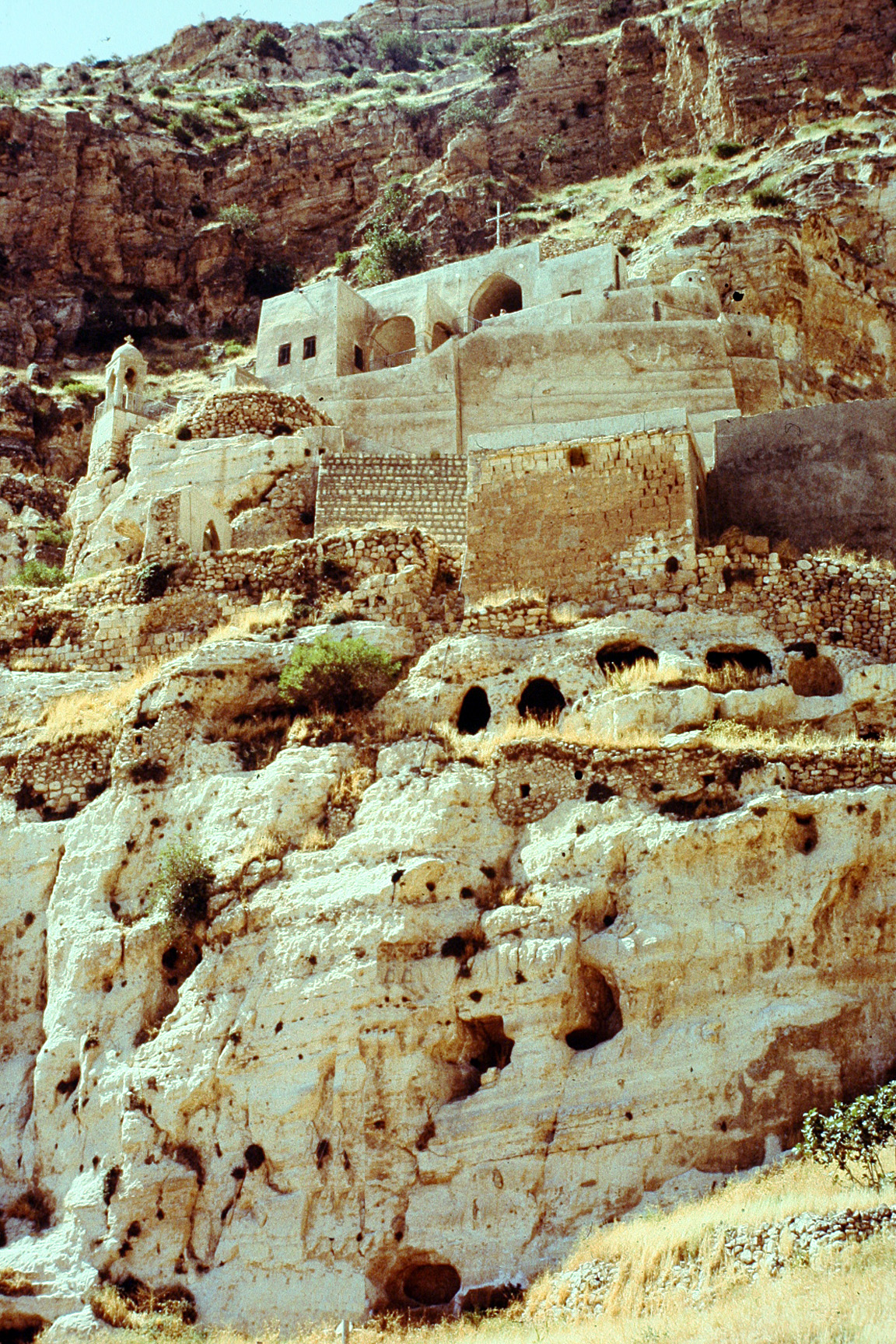
The ancient Rabban Hormizd Monastery, former residence of the Patriarchs of the Church of the East

Eliya X (Syriac: ܐܠܝܐ / Elīyā, d. 14 December 1722) was Patriarch of the Church of the East from 1700 to 1722, with residence in Rabban Hormizd Monastery, near Alqosh, in modern Iraq. During his tenure, traditional ties of the Patriarchate with the remaining Christian community of the East Syriac Rite in India were re-established, and in 1708 bishop Mar Gabriel (d. c. 1733) was sent there by the Patriarch, succeeding upon arrival to the Malabar Coast to revive the local East Syriac Christian community.

In older historiography, he was designated as Eliya X, but later renumbered as Eliya "XI" by some authors. After the resolution of several chronological questions, he was designated again as Eliya X, and that numeration is accepted in recent scholarly works.

== See also ==
- Patriarch of the Church of the East
- List of Patriarchs of the Church of the East
- Assyrian Church of the East

== Notes ==
Church of the East titles
Preceded by Eliya IX (1660–1700)	Catholicos-Patriarch of the Church of the East; Eliya line (Alqosh) (1700–1722)	Succeeded by Eliya XI (1722–1778)
