= Eliya IX =

Patriach of the Church of the East (1660 - 1700)

Mar Eliya IX
- Patriarch of the Church of the East
- Church: Church of the East
- Installed: 1660
- Term ended: 1700
- Predecessor: Eliya VIII
- Successor: Eliya X

Personal details
- Died: 17 May 1700
- Residence: Rabban Hormizd Monastery

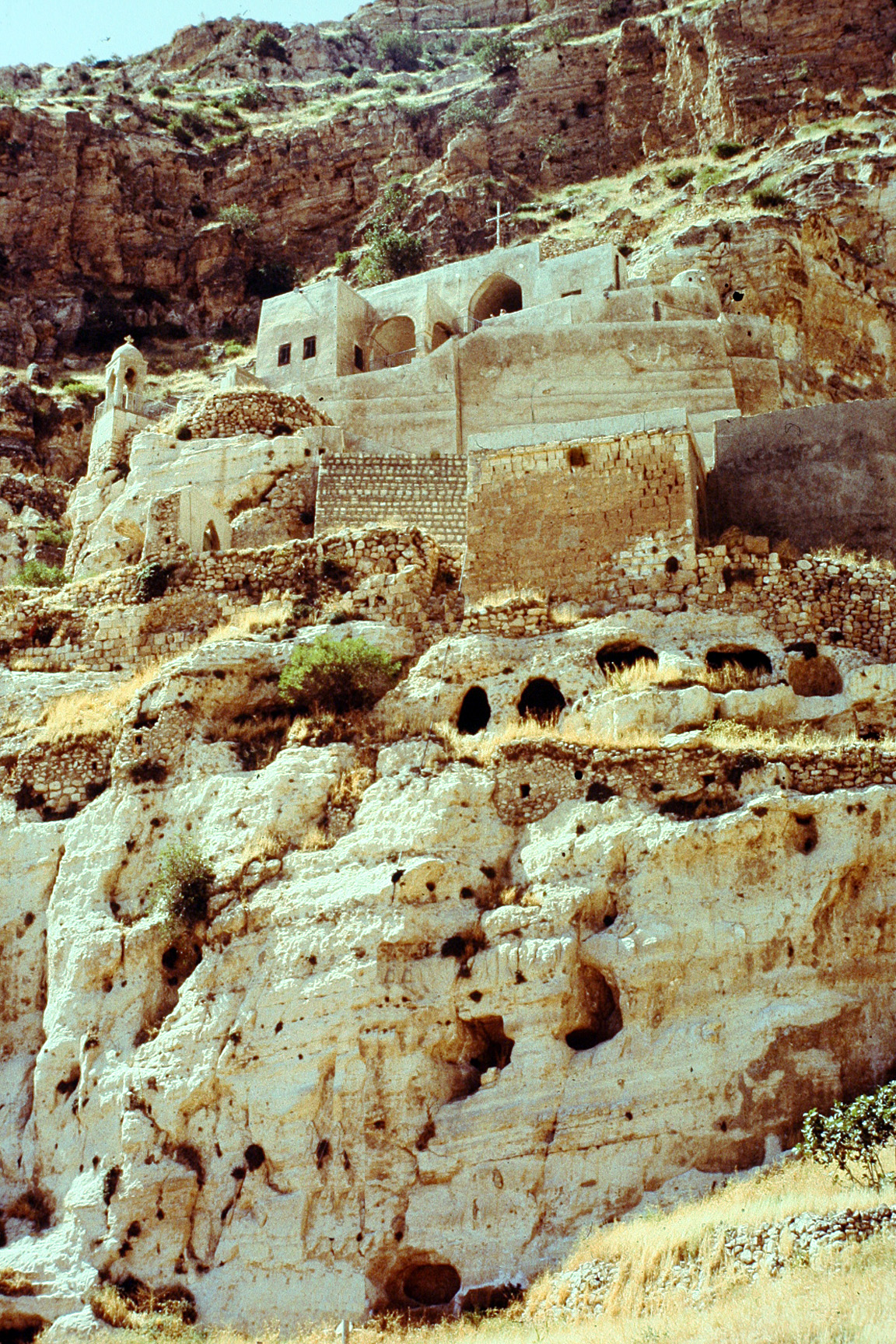
The ancient Rabban Hormizd Monastery, former residence of the Patriarchs of the Church of the East

Eliya IX (Syriac: ܐܠܝܐ / Elīyā, died 17 May 1700) was Patriarch of the Church of the East from 1660 to 1700, with his residence in Rabban Hormizd Monastery, near Alqosh, in modern Iraq. He was a "vigorous defender of the traditional faith", and on several occasions acted against local representatives of the Catholic Church in the region. His correspondence with Rome, in 1668–1669, ended without agreement on the discussed issues.

In older historiography, he was designated as Eliya IX, but later renumbered as Eliya "X" by some authors. After the resolution of several chronological questions, he was designated again as Eliya IX, and that numeration is accepted in recent scholarly works.

== See also ==
- Patriarch of the Church of the East
- List of Patriarchs of the Church of the East
- Assyrian Church of the East

== Notes ==
Church of the East titles
Preceded by Eliya VIII (1617–1660)	Catholicos-Patriarch of the Church of the East; Eliya line (Alqosh) (1660–1700)	Succeeded by Eliya X (1700–1722)
