= Eliya VII =

Mar Eliya VII
- Patriarch of the Church of the East
- Church: Church of the East
- Installed: 1591
- Term ended: 1617
- Predecessor: Eliya VI
- Successor: Eliya VIII

Personal details
- Died: 26 May 1617
- Residence: Rabban Hormizd Monastery

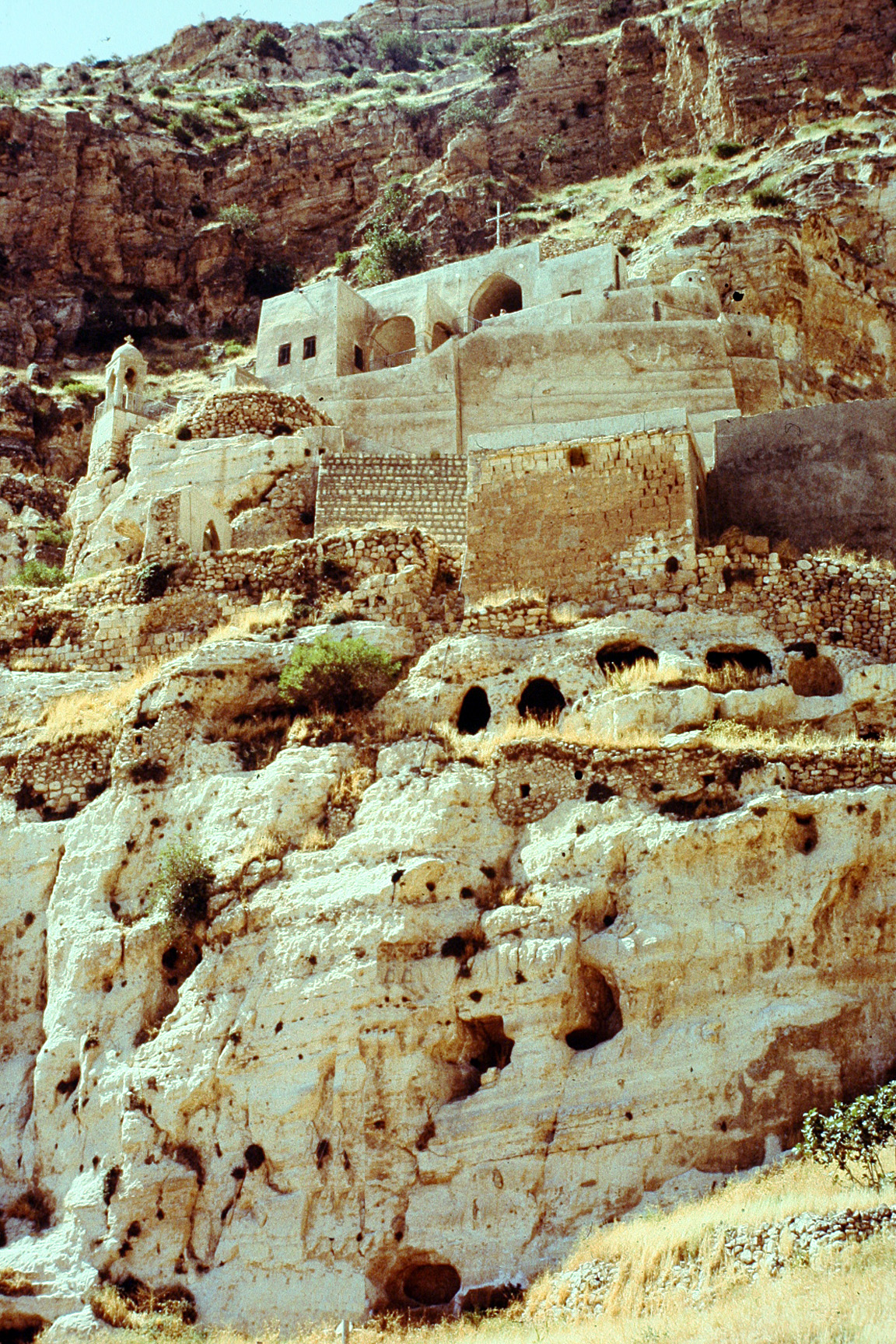
The ancient Rabban Hormizd Monastery, former residence of the Patriarchs of the Church of the East

Eliya VII (Syriac: ܐܠܝܐ / Elīyā, d. 26 May 1617) was Patriarch of the Church of the East from 1591 to 1617, with residence in Rabban Hormizd Monastery, near Alqosh, in modern Iraq. On several occasions, in 1605–1607 and 1610, and again in 1615–1616, he negotiated on with representatives of the Catholic Church, but without any final conclusion. In older historiography, he was designated as Eliya VII, but later renumbered as Eliya "VIII" by some authors. After the resolution of several chronological questions, he was designated again as Eliya VII, and that numeration is accepted in recent scholarly works.

== See also ==
- Patriarch of the Church of the East
- List of Patriarchs of the Church of the East
- Assyrian Church of the East

== Notes ==
Church of the East titles
Preceded by Eliya VI (1558–1591)	Catholicos-Patriarch of the Church of the East; Eliya line (Alqosh) (1591–1617)	Succeeded by Eliya VIII (1617–1660)
