= Eliya XI =

Mar Eliya XI
- Patriarch of the Church of the East
- Church: Church of the East
- Installed: 1722
- Term ended: 1778
- Predecessor: Eliya X
- Successor: Eliya XII

Personal details
- Died: April 1778
- Residence: Rabban Hormizd Monastery

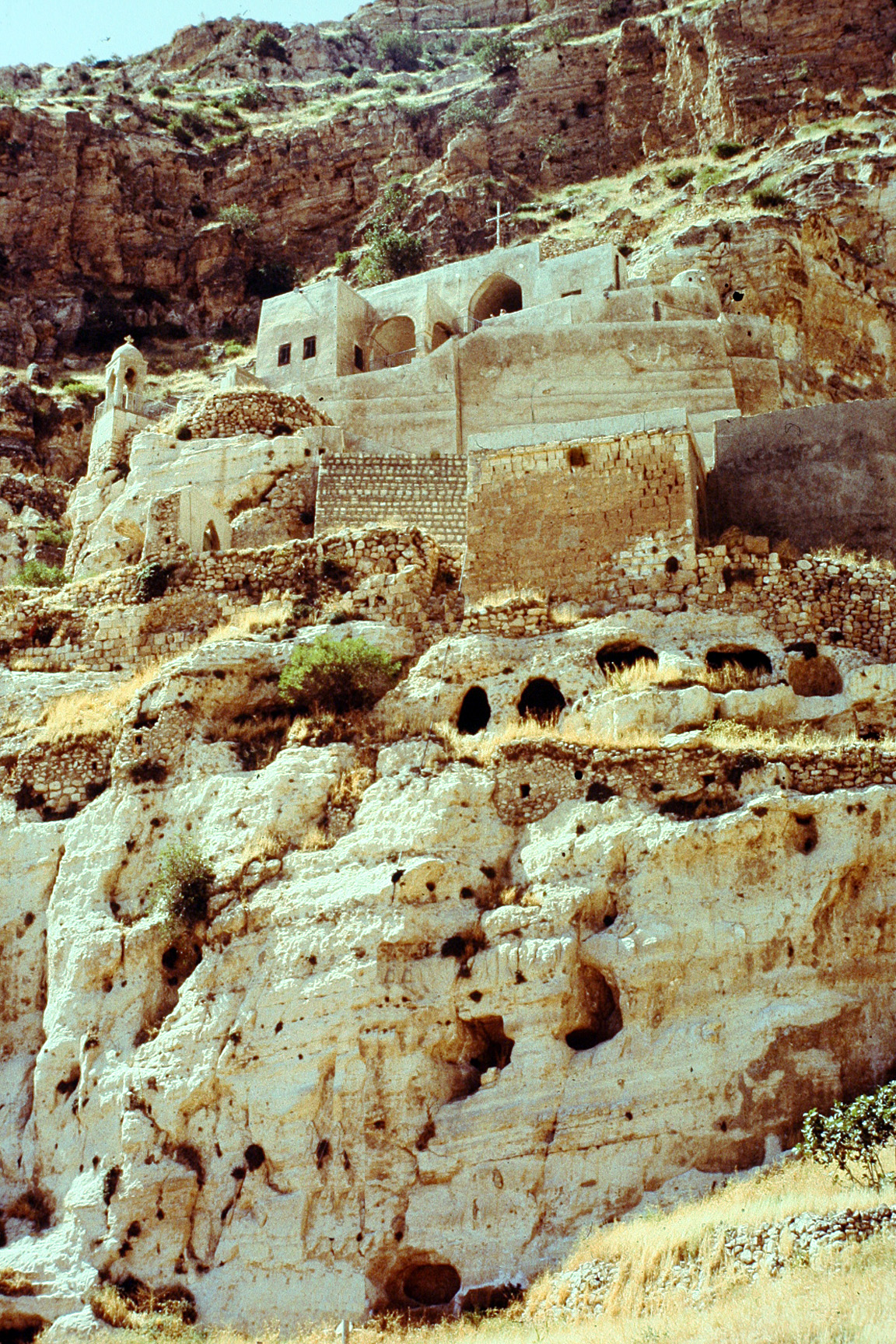
The ancient Rabban Hormizd Monastery, former residence of the Patriarchs of the Church of the East

Eliya XI (Syriac: ܐܠܝܐ / Elīyā, 1700 - April 1778) was Patriarch of the Church of the East from 1722 to 1778, with his residence in Rabban Hormizd Monastery, near Alqosh, in modern Iraq. His father, the priest Hoshaba, was the brother of the previous patriarch Eliya X (died 14 December 1722). Upon that patriarch's death, Eliya XI was elected to the patriarchal see, and enthroned on 25 December 1722.

At the beginning of the Ottoman–Persian War (1743–1746), his residence, the Patriarchal Monastery of Rabban Hormizd, was attacked and looted in 1743. Faced with frequent conflicts between two mighty Islamic empires (Ottoman and Persian), local Christians in the frontier regions were constantly exposed to danger, not only in times of war, but also during the interwar years, since local Kurdish warlords were accustomed to attack Christian communities and monasteries. Patriarch Eliya XI tried to improve the increasingly worsening position of his Christian flock, by staying loyal to Ottoman authorities, but the local administration was frequently unable to provide effective protection.

In older historiography, he was designated as Eliya XI, but later renumbered as Eliya "XII" by some authors. After the resolution of several chronological questions, he was designated again as Eliya XI, and that numeration is generally accepted in recent scholarly works, with some exceptions.

== See also ==
- Patriarch of the Church of the East
- List of patriarchs of the Church of the East
- Assyrian Church of the East

== Notes ==
Church of the East titles
Preceded by Eliya X (1700–1722)	Catholicos-Patriarch of the Church of the East; Eliya line (Alqosh) (1722–1778)	Succeeded by Eliya XII (1778–1804)
