= Yaqob I =

Primate of the Church of the East

Yaʿqob I was a legendary primate of the Church of the East, from the family of Joseph the carpenter, who is conventionally believed to have reigned c.190.

== Sources ==
Brief accounts of the life of Yaʿqob are given in the Ecclesiastical Chronicle of the Jacobite writer Bar Hebraeus (floruit 1280) and in the ecclesiastical histories of the Nestorian writers Mari (twelfth-century), ʿAmr (fourteenth-century) and Sliba (fourteenth-century). These accounts differ slightly, and these minor differences are of significance for scholars interested in tracing the various stages in the development of the legend.

Although Yaʿqob is included in traditional lists of primates of the Church of the East, his existence has been doubted by J. M. Fiey, one of the most eminent twentieth-century scholars of the Church of the East. In Fiey's view, Yaʿqob was one of several fictitious bishops of Seleucia-Ctesiphon whose lives were concocted in the sixth century to bridge the gap between the late third century bishop Papa, the first historically attested bishop of Seleucia-Ctesiphon, and the apostle Mari, the legendary founder of Christianity in Persia.

== Life of Abraham ==
The following account of the life of Yaʿqob is given by Mari:

Yaʿqob, a Hebrew, from the family of Joseph, the husband of Mary, was sent from Jerusalem after he had modestly attempted to refuse such a dignity, pleading that he was too humble to accept an office which he later fulfilled splendidly. He was invested with all the grades of the priesthood at the same time, and governed the church exceptionally well. He was a prudent man of high morals, who devoted himself to prayer and fasting. He selected bishops who were as upright as he himself was, and the results matched his hopes. Churches were built and the faithful were governed wisely. In his time there flourished the second empire of Persia, and the city of Ardashir was built and named after its king. Then too the philosopher Porphyry flourished in Egypt, who published a refutation of the Gospel. Yaʿqob died after ruling the church for eighteen years and six months, and was buried in al-Madaʿin.

The brief notice of the life of Yaʿqob given by Bar Hebraeus is entirely dependent on Mari's slightly longer account:

After Abraham, Yaʿqob. He too was of the family of Joseph the carpenter. He was elected and consecrated at Jerusalem, and sent into the East. There he deliberately chose to lead a life of poverty and asceticism. He died after fulfilling his office for eighteen years, and was buried at Seleucia. In his time lived Porphyry the Sicilian, who attacked the truth of the Gospel.

== See also ==
- List of patriarchs of the Church of the East

== Notes ==
Church of the East titles
Preceded by Abraham (159–171)	Patriarch of the East c.190	Succeeded by Ahadabui (204–220)
