= Farbokht =

Primate of the Church of the East in 421

Farbokht (or Marabokht) served briefly as bishop of Seleucia-Ctesiphon, grand metropolitan and primate of the Church of the East in 421. He is included in the traditional list of patriarchs of the Church of the East.

== Sources ==
Brief accounts of Farbokht's short reign are given in the Ecclesiastical Chronicle of the Jacobite writer Bar Hebraeus (floruit 1280) and in the ecclesiastical histories of the Nestorian writers Mari (twelfth-century), ʿAmr (fourteenth-century) and Sliba (fourteenth-century). His life is also covered in the Chronicle of Seert.

Modern assessments of his reign can be found in Wigram's Introduction to the History of the Assyrian Church and David Wilmshurst's The Martyred Church.

== Farbokht's patriarchate ==
The following account of Farbokht's reign is given by Bar Hebraeus:

After Magna [Maʿna], Marabokht. This is a Persian name. This man, after the anathematisation of Magna, bribed king Bahram, son of Yazdegerd, and compelled the bishops to consecrate him under threat of force. The bishops then fled to the leading men of the kingdom and found an opportunity to depose Marabokht, and after rejecting him completely hurled an anathema against him.

A slightly fuller account of Farbokht's reign is given by Mari:

The patriarch Farbokht was bishop of Kazrun. After the death of the patriarch Maʿna he sought the help of the captain of Bahram's guard to seek the patriarchate, giving him large sums of money and promising to follow the customs of the magi; and at the same time he began to importune the people and the leaders until they appointed him patriarch. He sat for only a short space of time, and before long the fathers and the bishops urgently implored the friends of Bahram to depose him. And so the church was saved from his wickedness, and his name was expunged from the roll of the living and the dead.

== See also ==
- List of patriarchs of the Church of the East

== Notes ==
Church of the East titles
Preceded by Maʿna (420)	Catholicos-Patriarch of the East (421)	Succeeded by Dadishoʿ (421–456)
