= Gianfranco Fiaccadori =

Gianfranco Fiaccadori (16 October 1957 – 24 January 2015) was an Italian historian. By training a Byzantinist, he also studied and published in Oriental studies and Ethiopian studies. Fellow historian Alessandro Bausi called him "one of the last humanists in the broadest sense, intimately familiar with everything from classical to Christian antiquities, through Late Antiquity, Byzantium, the Middle Ages, and beyond".

Fiaccadori was born in Parma. By the age of seventeen, when he entered the Scuola Normale Superiore di Pisa, he was fluent in Greek and Latin. He wrote his dissertation on the life of Gregentios, La ‘Vita’ di s. Gregenzio, vescovo dei Himyariti, under the supervision of Giovanni Pugliese Carratelli and Vera von Falkenhausen, in 1978–79. He received his doctorate in 1983. Beginning in that year, he took part in archaeological excavations in Bosra, identifying and publishing numerous Greek and Latin inscriptions.

Fiaccadori spent some time at Dumbarton Oaks before accepting an associate professorship for Byzantine History and the History of Material Culture in the Middle Ages at the University of Udine in 1987. From 1988, he was a visiting professor of late antique and Byzantine archaeology at the Italian School of Archaeology at Athens. In 1992, he published a monograph on Theophilus the Indian. In 1994–95, he was a visiting professor of the Pontifical Oriental Institute. He was promoted to full professor at Udine in 1995 and started lecturing on epigraphy, Christian antiquities and Ethiopian antiquities. He moved to the University of Milan in 2001, where he was professor of Late Antique and Medieval Artistic Culture and Byzantine Civilization. He curated several exhibitions in Venice between 1994 and 2009.

Although he never visited Ethiopia, his interest in Ethiopian studies grew in later years. He served as coeditor of the second through fifth volumes of the Encyclopaedia Aethiopica.

Fiaccadori died in his home in Parma after a short oncological illness.
