= Catholicos =

Title used for the head of churches in some Eastern Christian traditions

A catholicos (plural: catholicoi) is the head of certain churches in some Eastern Christian traditions. The title implies autocephaly and, in some cases, it is the title of the head of an autonomous church. The word comes from ancient Greek καθολικός (pl. καθολικοί), derived from καθ' ὅλου (kath'olou, "generally") from κατά (kata, "down") and ὅλος (holos, "whole"), meaning "concerning the whole, universal, general"; it originally designated a financial or civil office in the Roman Empire.

The Church of the East, some Oriental Orthodox, Eastern Orthodox, and Eastern Catholic churches historically use this title, including the Armenian Apostolic Church and the Georgian Orthodox Church. In the Church of the East, the title was given to its head, the patriarch; it is still used in the two successor-churches, the Assyrian Church of the East and the Ancient Church of the East, the heads of which are known as catholicos-patriarchs. In the Armenian Church, there are two catholicoi: the Supreme Catholicos of Etchmiadzin and the Catholicos of the House of Cilicia. The title catholicos-patriarch is also used by the primate of the Armenian Catholic Church. In India, the title catholicos is used by both the autocephalous Malankara Orthodox Syrian Church, headed by the Catholicos of the East and Malankara Metropolitan, and the autonomous Jacobite Syrian Christian Church (under the Syriac Orthodox Church), headed by the Catholicos of India (also known as the Maphrian).

== Origin of the title ==
The earliest ecclesiastical use of the title catholicos was by the Bishop of Etchmiadzin, head of the Armenian Apostolic Church, in the 4th century. Among the Armenians, catholicos was originally a simple title for the principal bishop of the country; he was subordinate to the See of Caesarea in Cappadocia.

Sometime later, it was adopted by the Grand metropolitans of Seleucia-Ctesiphon in Persia, who became the designated heads of the Church of the East. The first claim that the bishop of Selucia-Ctesiphon was superior to the other bishoprics and had (using a later term) patriarchal rights was made by Patriarch Papa bar Aggai (c. 317 – c. 329). In the 5th century this claim was strengthened and Isaac (or Ishaq, 399 – c. 410), who organized the Council of Seleucia-Ctesiphon, used the title of bishop of Selucia-Ctesiphon, Catholicos and Head over the bishops of all the Orient. This line of catholicos founded the Church of the East and the development of the East Syriac Rite.

At the beginning of the fourth century, Albania and Georgia (Iberia) converted to Christianity, and the principal bishop of each of these countries bore the title of catholicos, although neither of them was autocephalous. They followed the Armenians in rejecting the Council of Chalcedon. At the end of the sixth or beginning of the seventh century, the Georgian catholicos asserted his independence and accepted Eastern Orthodoxy. In 1783, Georgia was forced to abolish the office of its catholicos, and place itself under the Most Holy Synod of Russia, to which country it was united politically in 1801. The Albanian catholicos remained loyal to the Armenian Church, with the exception of a brief schism towards the end of the sixth century. Shortly afterwards, Albania was assimilated partly with Armenia and partly with Georgia.

== Catholicoi in various churches ==
=== Autocephalous churches of the East ===
The following are autocephalous churches of East Syriac Rite that claim succession to the Catholicos of the East of Selucia-Ctesiphon of the Church of the East. Referred to as "Nestorianism" in Western texts, the term Nestorian was formally renounced in 1976 by Mar Dinkha IV.

==== Assyrian Church of the East ====
As of September 13, 2021, Awa III is the Catholicos-Patriarch of the Assyrian Church of the East. One of the oldest Christian churches, it is a modern successor of the historical Church of the East. It traces its origins to the See of Seleucia-Ctesiphon in central Mesopotamia, which tradition holds was founded by Thomas the Apostle as well as Mari of Edessa and Addai of Edessa in the year 33 as asserted in the Doctrine of Addai. It is one of the three churches of the East that hold themselves distinct from Oriental and Eastern Orthodoxy. It is often called the Chaldean Syrian Church in India.

==== Ancient Church of the East ====
As of 28 September 2026, Mar Gewargis III Younan is the Catholicos-Patriarch of the Ancient Church of the East, which split from the Assyrian Church of the East in the 1960s.

=== Eastern Orthodox Church ===
==== Georgian Orthodox Church ====
The title of catholicos is also used in the Georgian Church, whose head carries the title Catholicos-Patriarch of All Georgia.

- Catholicos of Georgian Orthodox Church
  - Shio III is the current (as of 13 May 2026) Catholicos of the Georgian Orthodox Church.

=== Oriental Orthodox Churches ===
==== Armenian Apostolic Church ====
In the Armenian Church there are two catholicoi: the Supreme Catholicos of Etchmiadzin and the Catholicos of Cilicia. The Catholicos of Etchmiadzin presides over the Supreme Spiritual Council of the Armenian Apostolic Church and is the head of the world's 7 million Armenian Apostolic Christians. The primacy of honour of the Catholicosate of Etchmiadzin has always been recognized by the Catholicosate of Cilicia.

- Catholicos of Etchmiadzin (Catholicos of All Armenians) of the Armenian Apostolic Church
  - Karekin II is the current Catholicos of the Armenian Apostolic Church.
- Catholicosate of the Great House of Cilicia, residing in Antelias, Lebanon (historically based in Sis in Cilicia)
  - Aram I is the present Catholicos of the Great House of Cilicia.

Until the 19th century, there were also two other high-ranking Armenian clergymen who held the title of Catholicos: the Catholicos of Albania (also known as the Catholicos of Gandzasar) and the Catholicos of Aghtamar.

==== Syriac Orthodox Church ====
In the seventh century, the Syriac Orthodox Christians who lived in Persia began using the title for its catholicos / maphrian (also known as the Catholicate of the East to counter the Nestorian catholicate), who was originally the head of the Syriac Orthodox Christian community in Persia. This office ranked second in the Syriac Orthodox church hierarchy after the Syriac Orthodox patriarch of Antioch, until it was abolished in 1860 and reinstated in the India as the Catholicate of the East on 1964 and then the title of the ecclesiastical office was changed to Catholicate of India in 2002 but the hierarchy remains unchanged.

Today, the title is known as Maphrian of the East or Catholicos of India, who is the regional head of the Malankara Jacobite Syrian Christian Church which is an integral branch of Syriac Orthodox Church of Antioch headed by Ignatius Aphrem II, Syriac patriarch of Antioch. The current catholicos of the church is Baselios Joseph I.

==== Malankara Orthodox Syrian Church ====
The Primate of the Malankara Orthodox Syrian Church is the Catholicos of the East and Malankara Metropolitan. As of 2021, the present catholicos and Malankara metropolitan of the church is Baselios Marthoma Mathews III, who is the 9th catholicos of the East since the office's re-establishment in India.

==== Ethiopian Orthodox Tewahedo Church ====
In 1959, the Coptic Orthodox Church of Alexandria granted autocephaly to the Ethiopian Orthodox Tewahedo Church. Abuna Basilios was consecrated as the first patriarch-catholicos of the Ethiopian Church by the Coptic Pope Cyril VI at St. Mark's Cathedral in Cairo on 28 June 1959. The title of the Primate of the Ethiopian Church is "Patriarch and Catholicos of Ethiopia, Ichege of the See of St. Tekle Haymanot, Archbishop of Axum".

=== Catholic Church ===
Some Eastern Catholic Churches use the title "catholicos" (Catholicus in Latin).

==== Armenian Catholic Church ====
The leader of the Armenian Catholic Church (of Armenian Rite), in full communion with the Roman pope, uses the title "catholicos".

As of March 14, 2022, Raphaël Bedros XXI Minassian is the Catholicos-Patriarch of the Armenian Catholic Church. His full title is officially "Catholicos-Patriarch of the House of Cilicia".

==== Chaldean Catholic Church ====
The Chaldean Catholic Church (of East Syriac Rite) is in full communion with the Roman pope. Although derived from the historical Church of the East, whose leader was initially styled major metropolitan and catholicos and later patriarch (see Church of the East#Organisation and structure), it seems to use only the title of "patriarch".

As of February 1, 2013, Louis Raphaël I Sako was the Patriarch of Babylon of the Chaldeans, who abdicated on March 10 2026 and was succeeded by Paul III Nona.

==== Syro-Malankara Catholic Church ====
The Syro-Malankara Catholic Church of West Syriac Rite in full communion with the pope is a major archiepiscopal church, a rank granted to the Eastern Catholic church by Pope John Paul II on 10 February 2005. Accordingly it is headed by Major Archbishop Baselios Cardinal Cleemis catholicos since 2007.

His style of reference is "Catholicos of the Syro Malankara Catholic Church". The title is not officially recognized by Vatican, but it is used to indicates parity between him and his peers in the autocephalous Malankara Orthodox Syrian Church and in the Jacobite Syrian Christian Church, which remains part of the Syriac Orthodox Church.

== Sources ==
- Baum, Wilhelm; Winkler, Dietmar W. (2003). The Church of the East: A Concise History. London-New York: Routledge-Curzon. ISBN 9781134430192.
- Chabot, Jean-Baptiste (1902). Synodicon orientale ou recueil de synodes nestoriens (PDF). Paris: Imprimerie Nationale.
- Meyendorff, John (1989). Imperial unity and Christian divisions: The Church 450-680 A.D. The Church in history. Vol. 2. Crestwood, NY: St. Vladimir's Seminary Press. ISBN 9780881410563.
- Wigram, William Ainger (1910). An Introduction to the History of the Assyrian Church or The Church of the Sassanid Persian Empire 100-640 A.D. London: Society for Promoting Christian Knowledge. ISBN 9780837080789.
