= Shahlufa =

Shahlufa (Classical Syriac: ܫܚܠܘܦܐ, romanized: šaḥlūfā, lit. 'Substitute') was a legendary primate of the Church of the East, who is conventionally believed to have reigned from 220 to 224 A.D.

== Sources ==
Brief accounts of the life of Shahlufa are given in the Ecclesiastical Chronicle of the Jacobite writer Bar-Hebraeus (fl. 1280) and in the ecclesiastical histories of the Nestorian writers Mari (twelfth-century), ʿAmr (fourteenth-century) and Sliba (fourteenth-century). These accounts differ slightly, and these minor differences are of significance for scholars interested in tracing the various stages in the development of the legend.

Although Shahlufa is included in traditional lists of primates of the Church of the East, his existence has been doubted by J. M. Fiey, one of the most eminent twentieth-century scholars of the Church of the East. In Fiey's view, Shahlufa was one of several fictitious bishops of Seleucia-Ctesiphon whose lives were concocted in the sixth century to bridge the gap between the late third century bishop Papa, the first historically attested bishop of Seleucia-Ctesiphon, and the apostle Mari, the legendary founder of Christianity in Persia.

== Life of Shahlufa ==
The following brief account of the life of Shahlufa is given by Bar-Hebraeus:

After Ahadabui, Shahlufa. He was a native of Kashkar. After the death of Ahadabui, the Eastern bishops assembled and consecrated him. He was the first catholicus to be consecrated by the Eastern bishops. He died at Seleucia after fulfilling his office for twenty years.

== See also ==
- List of patriarchs of the Church of the East

== Notes ==
Church of the East titles
Preceded by Ahadabui (204–220)	Patriarch of the East; Bishop of Seleucia-Ctesiphon (220–224)	Succeeded by Vacant (224–c. 280); Papa (c.280–317)
