= Council of Seleucia-Ctesiphon =

Council creating the Christian Church of the East (410)

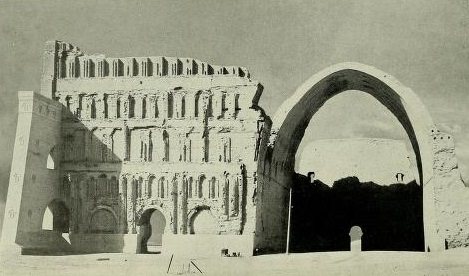
Ruined palace at Ctesiphon

The Council of Seleucia-Ctesiphon, also called the Council of Mar Isaac, met in AD 410 in Seleucia-Ctesiphon, the capital of the Persian Sasanian Empire. Convened by King Yazdegerd I (399–421), it organized the Christians of his empire into a single structured church, which became known as the Church of the East. The Council is often compared to Constantine's Edict of Milan from approximately a century earlier. The events of this council are documented in the Synodicon Orientale.

Previously, the Persian state persecuted those Christians, fearing that their loyalty lay with the Roman Empire, which under Constantine the Great had legalized Christianity and with which the Sassanid Empire was repeatedly at war. Persecution had been most severe under Shapur II (309–379). Shapur I (241–272), the second Shahan-shah (king of kings) of the Sasanian dynasty had advanced as far as Antioch in 260, and both he and Shapur II deported eastward much of the population of the invaded territories to strengthen the Persian economy.

Yazdegerd I adopted a policy of engagement with the Roman Emperor in Constantinople and with the Christian minority in his own empire. In 409, he allowed the Christians to worship openly and to have churches. Zoroastrianism continued to be the official religion, and apostasy from it was punishable by death.

At the suggestion of a bishop from the Roman side of the frontier, a council of bishops was called to organize the Persian Christians as a single Church, with a single bishop in each diocese and with one bishop to act as their head collectively throughout his empire (See Maruthas of Martyropolis).

== Establishment of the Church of the East ==
The Council, presided over by Mar Isaac, archbishop of Seleucia-Ctesiphon, arranged the Persian Church in ecclesiastical provinces, with the bishops in each province grouped around a metropolitan, the arrangement approved by the First Council of Nicaea (325) in the civil provinces of the Roman Empire.

The archbishop of Seleucia-Ctesiphon, the capital city, who is referred to in the acts of the council as the Grand Metropolitan, was to hold authority throughout the Church and for that reason was called (probably only from a later date) the Catholicos.

The 410 council set up six provinces, which became known as the interior provinces, according as other provinces, referred to as exterior provinces, were recognized further afield within the empire and even beyond it.

In order of precedence, the six interior provinces were:

1. Seleucia-Ctesiphon, in what is now central Iraq
2. Beth Lapat, in western Iran
3. Nisibis, on the border between today's Turkey and Iraq
4. Prat de Maishan, Basra, southern Iraq
5. Arbela, Erbil, Kurdistan region of Iraq
6. Karka de Beth Slokh, Kirkuk, northeastern Iraq

The council marked a major milestone in the history of the Church of the East and of Christianity in Asia in general.

== Uncertain early example of the Filioque ==
The synod also declared its adherence to the decisions of the First Council of Nicaea and adopted a form of the Nicene Creed. The creed is found in two different recensions, each of which is recorded in much later manuscripts. The first recension is East Syriac and comes from Church of the East sources. The second is West Syriac and comes from Syriac Orthodox sources. The East Syriac recension contains: "And in the Holy Spirit" while the West Syriac recension contains: "And we confess the living and Holy Spirit, the living Paraclete, who is from the Father and the Son". There has long been controversy among scholars about the relation between the two texts. The development of the Persian creed is difficult to trace, since there were several recensions prior to 410. The first recension is textually closer to the original Nicene Creed. On the other hand, some scholars claim that the second represents the original text of the Seleucia-Ctesiphon Council, and that the words "who is from the Father and the Son" in the second recension are the earliest example of the Filioque clause.

== See also ==
- Catholicos
- Dioceses of the Church of the East to 1318
- List of patriarchs of the Church of the East
- Patriarchs of the Church of the East
- Synod of Beth Lapat
- Syriac Christianity

== Sources ==
- Brock, Sebastian (1999) [chapter first published in 1985]. "The Christology of the Church in the East in the synods of the fifth to early seventh centuries: preliminary considerations and materials". In Ferguson, Everett (ed.). Doctrinal diversity: varieties of early Christianity. Recent studies in early Christianity. Vol. 4. New York: Garland. pp. 126, 133 in 1985 original (pp. 282, 289 in 1999 faximile). ISBN 978-0-81533071-4.
- Chabot, Jean-Baptiste (1902). Synodicon orientale ou recueil de synodes nestoriens (PDF). Paris: Imprimerie Nationale.
- Panicker, Mathunny John (2002). "Synod of Seleucia-Ctesiphon 410". The person of Jesus Christ in the writings of Juhanon Gregorius Abu'l Faraj commonly called Bar Ebraya. Studien zur orientalischen Kirchengeschichte. Vol. 4. Münster [u.a.]: LIT Verlag. pp. 58–59. ISBN 978-3-82583390-9.
- Meyendorff, John (1989). Imperial unity and Christian divisions: The Church 450-680 A.D. The Church in history. Vol. 2. Crestwood, NY: St. Vladimir's Seminary Press. ISBN 9780881410563.
- Price, Richard; Gaddis, Michael, eds. (2005). The acts of the Council of Chalcedon. Translated texts for historians. Vol. 45. Translated by Price, Richard; Gaddis, Michael. Liverpool: Liverpool University Press. ISBN 978-0-85323039-7.
- Renard, John (2011). Islam and Christianity: theological themes in comparative perspective. Berkeley: University of California Press. ISBN 978-0-52025508-1.
- Wigram, William A. (1910). An introduction to the history of the Assyrian Church, or, The Church of the Sassanid Persian Empire, 100–640 A.D. Piscataway, NJ: Gorgias Press (published 2004). ISBN 1-59333-103-7. – 1910 first edition at the Internet Archive
- Williams, Daniel H. (2013). "The evolution of pro-Nicene theology in the Church of the East". In Tang, Li; Winkler, Dietmar W. (eds.). From the Oxus River to the Chinese shores: studies on East Syriac Christianity in China and Central Asia. 3rd International Conference on the Church of the East in China and Central Asia, June 4–9, 2009 in Salzburg, Austria. Orientalia—patristica—oecumenica. Vol. 5. Zürich; Berlin: LIT Verlag. pp. 387–395. ISBN 9783643903297.
- Curtin, D.P. (2021). Council of Seleucia-Ctesiphon, under Mar Isaac 410 AD. Philadelphia, PA: Dalcassian Publishing Company. ISBN 9781088234327.
