= Tomarsa =

Primate of the Church of the East, 363–371

Tomarsa (or Tamuza) was bishop of Seleucia-Ctesiphon and primate of the Church of the East from 363 to 371. He took office at the end of the great persecution of Shapur II. Like several other early bishops of Seleucia-Ctesiphon, he is included in the traditional list of patriarchs of the Church of the East.

== Sources ==
Brief accounts of Tomarsa's episcopate are given in the Ecclesiastical Chronicle of the Jacobite writer Bar Hebraeus (floruit 1280) and in the ecclesiastical histories of the Nestorian writers Mari (twelfth-century), ʿAmr (fourteenth-century) and Sliba (fourteenth-century). His life is also covered in the Chronicle of Seert. In all these accounts he is anachronistically called 'catholicus', a term that was only applied to the primates of the Church of the East in the fifth century.

Modern assessments of his reign can be found in Wigram's Introduction to the History of the Assyrian Church and David Wilmshurst's The Martyred Church.

== Tomarsa's episcopate ==
The following account of Tomarsa's episcopate and martyrdom is given by Bar Hebraeus:

After Barbʿashmin, Tamuza. This is a Chaldean name for one of the wandering stars, and is equivalent to the Greek Ares [Mars]. When the impious Julian descended into Persia to do battle with Shapur and died there, struck in the side by a missile, Shapur was convinced that this had happened by God’s will, because he had impiously persecuted the people of Christ. He therefore reversed his wicked policy, made peace with Jovian, Julian’s chief commander, and ordered the churches to be restored. Then the bishops assembled and chose Tamuza, and consecrated him catholicus. He was a man of conspicuous virtue and sanctity, and devoted all his efforts to the restoration of the churches. He also repaired the rents in discipline made by the persecution, compelling the faithful to enter into legitimate marriages, and for a while allowed only decrepit old men to assume the monastic habit, not young men, because the number of the faithful had declined greatly because of the persecution, and many had fallen away from the faith. After fulfilling his office for eight years, he died and was buried at Seleucia.

== See also ==
- List of patriarchs of the Church of the East

== Notes ==
Church of the East titles
Preceded by Barbaʿshmin (343–346); Vacant (c. 346–c.363)	Catholicos-Patriarch of the Church of the East; Bishop of Seleucia-Ctesiphon (363–371)	Succeeded by Vacant (c.371–c. 377); Qayyoma (377–399)
