= Papa bar Aggai =

Bishop of Seleucia-Ctesiphon

Papa bar Aggai (died c. 327/328) was the Bishop of Seleucia-Ctesiphon, the capital of Sassanid Persia, in the late 3rd and early 4th century. An important figure in the early history of the Church of the East, he was first in the generally recognized line of Bishops of Seleucia-Ctesiphon, who would later become the acknowledged head of the church. He was the first bishop to be given the title of Catholicos, and set about restructuring the previously disorganized Persian church. Some historians describe him as the founding figure of the Church of the East, though according to Syriac tradition, he was simply continuing a line of leaders, such as Mar Mari, that stretched back to Thomas the Apostle.

Prior to Papa's consecration the Christian community in Seleucia-Ctesiphon had no organized leadership or established episcopal succession. According to the scholar Mschikha-Zca, two visiting bishops, Akha d'abuh' of Arbil and the Bishop of Susa, appointed Papa so that the Persian capital might have its own bishop and diocese. This probably occurred around 280. He was considered a strong-willed and hot-tempered statesman, as well as a capable scholar in both the Persian and Syriac tongues.

During his tenure Papa made a substantial and controversial reorganization of the Persian church, setting himself up as head of a hierarchy of other bishops. For these efforts he was recognized as Catholicos of the Church in 315.

His changes, especially his attempt to establish the bishopric at Seleucia as the authority over the rest of the Persian Church had strong opposition. A council was called in Seleucia in 315 to investigate charges of personal misconduct. The two primary opponents were Aqib-Alaha, Bishop of Karka d'Baith Slok; and Miles, the non-resident Bishop of Susa. Papa refused to submit to the council's authority, "exalting himself above the bishops who were assembled to judge him." An angry exchange followed, as Miles demanded that Papa be judged, if not by man, then by the Gospel, and produced a copy of the Gospel from his own satchel and placed it on a cushion. Papa, furious, struck the book with his hand, exclaiming, "Then speak, Gospel, speak!" The sacrilege stunned the council's attendees, but then Papa fell senseless, struck with paralysis or apoplexy, or possibly a stroke. The Council accordingly accepted all accusations towards Papa as proven, and he was deposed. His archdeacon, Simeon Barsabae, was consecrated in his place, though he was reluctant to accept.

Papa recovered from his illness, though without the use of one of his arms. Resolving to recover his title as well, he appealed to the Bishop of Edessa, S'ada, and possibly also to James of Nisibis. As a result, the charges against Papa were annulled, though reports differ as to whether his accusers themselves were deposed. Papa continued as bishop for another 12 years, dying peacefully around 327 or 328. He was succeeded by Mar Simeon Barsabae.

== Notes ==
Church of the East titles
Preceded by Shahlufa (220–224); Vacant (224–280)	Catholicos-Patriarch of the East; Bishop of Seleucia-Ctesiphon (c. 280–317)	Succeeded by Vacant (317–329); Shemon Bar Sabbae (329–341)
