= Jean Maurice Fiey =

Jean Maurice Fiey (30 March 1914 – 10 November 1995) was a French Dominican Father and prominent Church historian and Syriacist.

== Biography ==
Fiey was born in Armentières on 30 March 1914, he entered the Dominican Order at an early age and received his Licentiate in philosophy and theology from the order's schools in France.

Fiey became acquainted with Syriac Christian tradition during his residence in Iraq from 1939 to 1973. He was one of the founders of the Mosul Dominican College in 1944 and functioned as its dean until 1959. After the Baathist takeover in 1968, Fiey was viewed suspiciously by the Iraqi government. He was expelled after being accused of being a spy, other Iraqi scholars including the Chaldean Patriarch Louis Sako claim the real reason lay behind his refusal to accommodate government view in his writings. Following his expulsion Fiey resided in Beirut as a lecturer in the Jesuit University. He received his doctorate from the University of Dijon in 1982.

== Works ==
Fiey was considered for decades the "undisputed authority on the historical geography of Syriac Christians". He published throughout his life over 127 books and articles.

=== Selected bibliography ===
- Mossoul chrétienne, 1959
- Assyrie chrétienne, vol.1 1965, vol.2 1966, vol.3 1968
- For the Corpus Scriptorum Christianorum Orientalium
  - Jalons pour une histoire de l'Eglise en Iraq, 1970
  - Anonymi auctoris chronincon ad annum christi 1234 pertinens, II, 1974
  - Chrétiens syriaques sous les Mongols (Il-Khanat de Perse, XIIIe-XIVe s.), 1975
  - Nisibe, métropole syriaque orientale et ses suffragants des origines à nos jours, 1977
  - Chrétiens syriaques sous les Abbassides, 1980
- Les Syriaques, 1996
- Saints Syriaques, 2005
