= Mari of Edessa =

Patriarch of the Church of the East

Saint Maris

Apostle of Persia
- Venerated in: Assyrian Church of the East; Ancient Church of the East; Chaldean Catholic Church; Syro-Malabar Catholic Church
- Feast: August 4; 2nd Friday of Qayta (Assyrian Church of the East)

Saint Mari [ܡܳܐܪܝ̣], also known as Mares or Maris [Μαρις], and originally named Palut [ܦܳܠܘ̣ܛ], is a saint of the Church of the East. He was converted by Thaddeus of Edessa, also known as "Addai"), and is said to have had as his spiritual director, Mar Aggai. He is venerated as the Apostle of Persia.

== Missionary work ==
He is identified as St. Mari of the seventy disciples with whom the Apocryphal Acts of Mar Mari are connected. According to the Acts of Mari, Addai sent him to convert the area south and east of Edessa. Mari is believed to have done missionary work around Nineveh, Nisibis, and along the Euphrates, and is said to have been one of the great apostles to Syria and Persia. He performs a number of miracles as proof of his holiness.

He and Thaddeus are credited with the Liturgy of Addai and Mari.

Mari was buried in Dayr-Kuni.

== Veneration ==
Mari is venerated as a saint by the Assyrian Church of the East, the Chaldean Catholic Church, and the Syro-Malabar Catholic Church. His feast day is 5 August in the Christian calendar.

== Bibliography ==
- Attwater, Donald and Catherine Rachel John. The Penguin Dictionary of Saints. 3rd edition. New York: Penguin Books, 1993.
- Aux origines de l'eglise de Perse: les Actes de Mar Mari. Еd. par Jullien C., Jullien F. Leuven, Peeters, 2003, VIII-137 p. (Corpus Scriptorum Christianorum Orientalium, 604).
- Jullien C., Jullien F. Les Actes de Mar Mari. Leuven, Peeters, 2003, VIII, 50 p. (Corpus Scriptorum Christianorum Orientalium, 602).
- The Acts of Mar Mari the Apostle. Ed. by Amir Harrak. Atlanta (GA), Society of Biblical Literature, 2005, 134 pp. (Writings from the Greco-Roman World, 11).
- Atti di Mar Mari. Ed. Ilaria Ramelli. Brescia: Paideia, 2008. 234 p. (Testi del Vicino Oriente antico 7, Letteratura della Siria cristiana, 2).

Church of the East titles
Preceded by Mar Aggai (c.66 – c.81)	Patriarch of the East; Bishop of Edessa (c. 87–120)	Succeeded by Mar Abris (121–137)
