= Ecumenism and interreligious dialogue of Pope Francis =

Pope Francis sought to improve relations and dialogue with people of other Christian faiths, with those of other religious beliefs, and with non-believers.

== Ecumenism ==
=== General overview ===
During the 2016 Octave of Christian Unity, Pope Francis "asked forgiveness for the way Catholics had treated other Christian believers over the years, and also invited Catholics to pardon those who had persecuted them".

In a December 2013 interview with La Stampa, Pope Francis emphasized his commitment to ecumenism, stating: "For me, ecumenism is a priority. Today, we have the ecumenism of blood. In some countries they kill Christians because they wear a cross or have a Bible, and before killing them they don't ask if they're Anglicans, Lutherans, Catholics or Orthodox. The blood is mixed". During the Week of Prayer for Christian Unity, Pope Francis addressed the attendees of the John 17 Movement gathering, opining that "Division is the work of the Father of Lies" and that he "knows that Christians are disciples of Christ: that they are one, that they are brothers! He doesn't care if they are Evangelicals, or Orthodox, Lutherans, Catholics or Apostolic... he doesn't care! They are Christians. And that blood (of martyrdom) unites. Today, dear brothers and sisters, we are living an 'ecumenism of blood'. This must encourage us to do what we are doing today: to pray, to dialogue together, to shorten the distance between us, to strengthen our bonds of brotherhood".

After Francis' death in 2025, Jerry Pillay, General Secretary of the World Council of Churches said that he would be mourned and his papacy would be recalled as "a great gift to the ecumenical movement ... he has been a dedicated collaborator in our efforts toward Christian unity and reconciliation".

=== Old Catholicism ===
In October 2014, Pope Francis met for the first time with a delegation of the Old Catholic Church's Bishops' Conference of the Union of Utrecht, led by the Archbishop of Utrecht and President of the International Old Catholic Bishops Conference, Joris Vercammen. The Pope reflected on the shared ecumenical journey of the two churches since their 19th-century schism over the issue of papal primacy. The Pope called for Catholics and Old Catholics to "persevere in dialogue and to walk, pray and work together in a deeper spirit of conversion", and said there are "many areas in which Catholics and Old Catholics can collaborate in tackling the profound spiritual crisis affecting individuals and societies, especially in Europe".

=== Orthodoxy ===
==== Eastern Orthodoxy ====
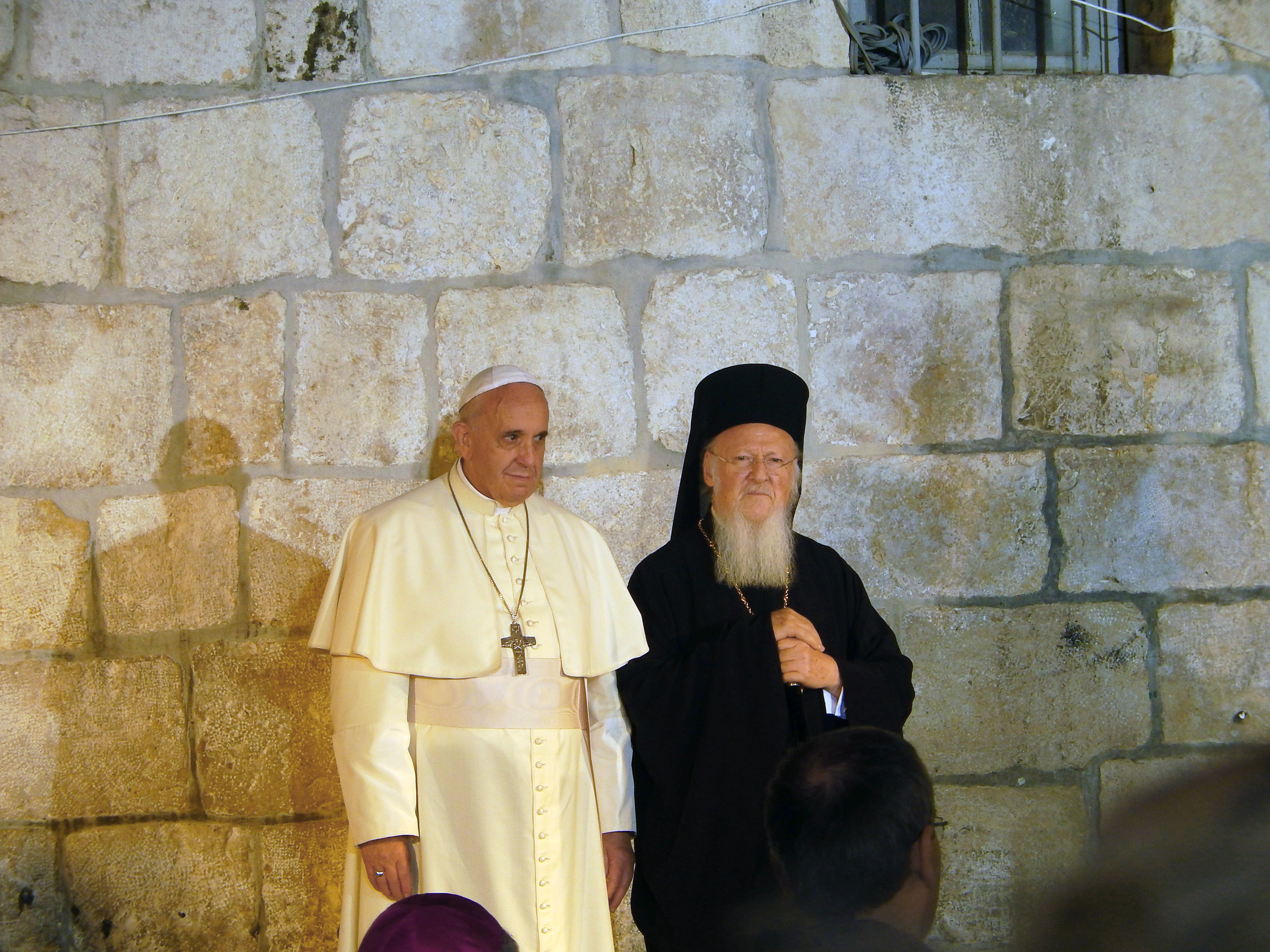
Francis with Patriarch Bartholomew I in the Church of the Holy Sepulchre, during his 2014 pilgrimage to the Holy Land

Francis has been recognized for his efforts "to further close the nearly 1,000-year estrangement with the Eastern Orthodox Churches". Antoni Sevruk, rector of the Russian Orthodox Church of Saint Catherine the Great Martyr in Rome, said that Pope Francis "often visited Orthodox services in the Russian Orthodox Annunciation Cathedral in Buenos Aires" and is known as an advocate on behalf of the Orthodox Church in dealing with Argentina's government.

Francis's positive relationship with the Eastern Orthodox Churches is reflected in the fact that Patriarch Bartholomew I of Constantinople attended his installation. This is the first time since the Great Schism of 1054 that the Orthodox Ecumenical Patriarch of Constantinople, a position considered first among equals in the Eastern Orthodox Church, has attended a papal installation. Orthodox leaders state that Bartholomew's decision to attend the ceremony shows that the relationship between the Orthodox and Catholic Churches is a priority of his, but they also note that Francis's "well-documented work for social justice and his insistence that globalization is detrimental to the poor" may have created a "renewed opportunity" for the two Church communities to "work collectively on issues of mutual concern". (Note: One source says that the gospel was chanted in Greek during the pope's inauguration Mass in recognition of Bartholomew's historic attendance, but the Vatican News Service paraphrased Federico Lombardi of the Vatican Press Office as explaining that "[t]he Gospel will be proclaimed in Greek, as at the highest solemnities, to show that the universal Church is made up of the great traditions of the East and the West." (emphasis added))

In 2013, Pope Francis received Theodore II, Pope and Patriarch of Alexandria and All Africa, the leader of the Greek Orthodox Church of Alexandria, in the Vatican.

On 12 February 2016, Pope Francis and Patriarch Kirill of Moscow, head of the Russian Orthodox Church, met in Havana, Cuba, issuing the Joint Declaration of Pope Francis and Patriarch Kirill, calling for restored Christian unity between the two churches. This was reported as the first such high-level meeting between the two churches since the Great Schism of 1054.

On 28 April 2017, Pope Francis participated in an ecumenical prayer service in Cairo, Egypt, with Ecumenical Patriarch Bartholomew and Coptic Orthodox Pope Tawadros II. This historic event appears to be the first time that the two Christian popes and the ecumenical patriarch have met together.

==== Oriental Orthodoxy ====
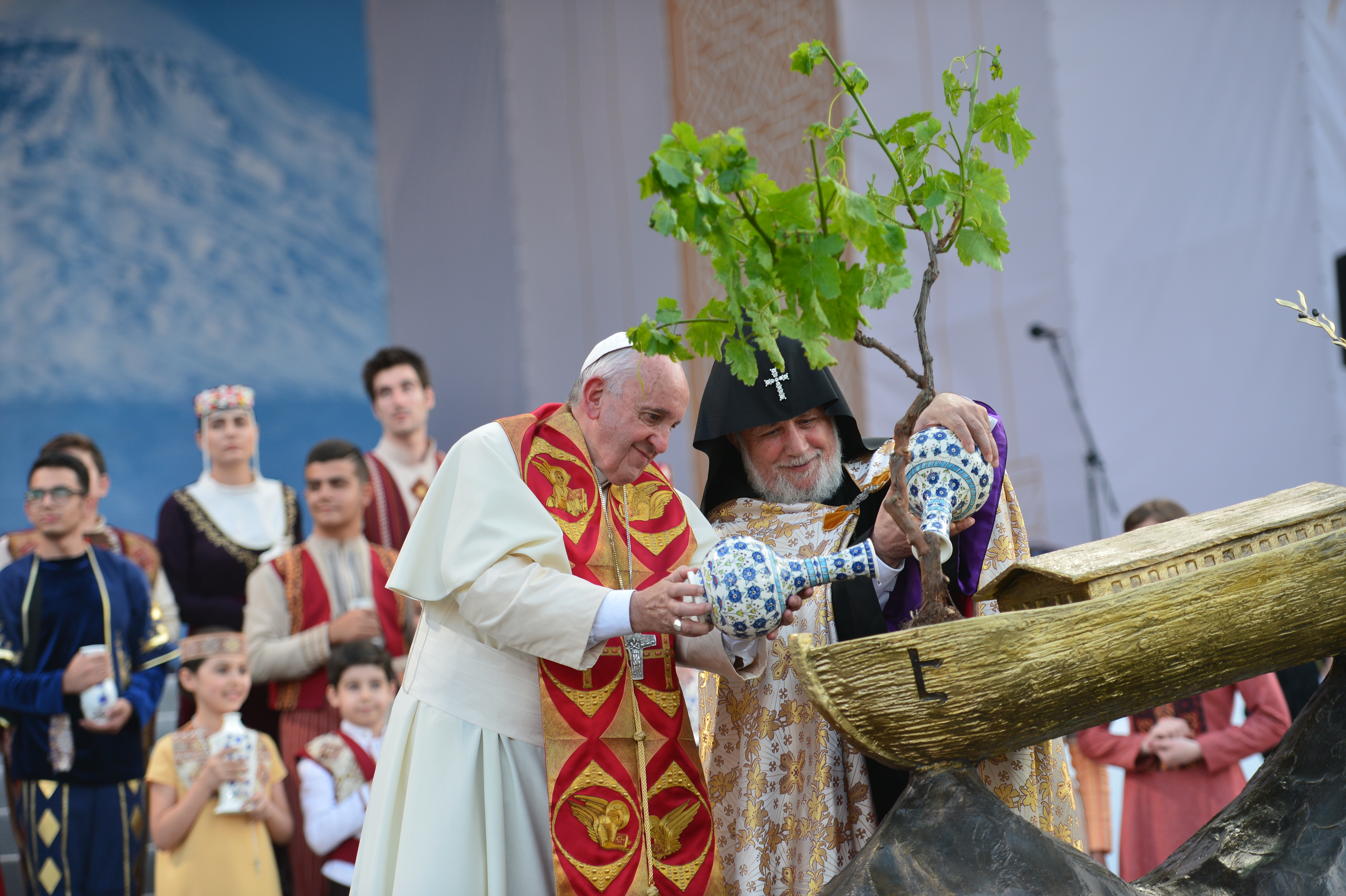
Pope Francis and Catholicos Garegin II at an ecumenic ceremony in the Republic Square, Yerevan, Armenia, June 2016

In May 2013, Pope Francis met with Pope Tawadros II of Alexandria in the Vatican. The meeting coincided with the 40th anniversary of the first visit by a Pope of the Coptic Orthodox Church of Alexandria to the Vatican, when Pope Shenouda III of Alexandria met with Pope Paul VI on 10 May 1973. Francis reflected on the close relationship between the Catholic Church and the Coptic Orthodox Church of Alexandria, saying that the visit "strengthens the bonds of friendship and brotherhood that already exist between the See of Peter and the See of Mark", and praised the Commission for Theological Dialogue for preparing ground for dialogue between the Catholic Church and Oriental Orthodox churches. Pope Francis also acknowledged the two churches shared beliefs in the Trinity, the divinity of Christ, Marian devotion, apostolic traditions, and the seven sacraments. In September 2013, Pope Francis met with Paulose II of the Malankara Orthodox Church. During their meeting, both heads discussed their progress in ecumenism and focused on what both churches plan on for the future. At the end of Pope Francis' speech he called upon the intercession of Sts. Peter and Thomas to bless the faithful of both churches. He said, "Let us pray for one another, invoking the protection of Saint Peter and Saint Thomas upon all the flock that has been entrusted to our pastoral care. May they who worked together for the Gospel, intercede for us and accompany the journey of our Churches". In May 2016, Pope Francis sent a letter to Tawadros II, acknowledging their shared commitment to holiness and defending the dignity of human life and celebrating friendship between Catholics and Coptic Orthodox Christians. The Pope said, "we are able even now to make visible the communion uniting us".

In June 2015, Pope Francis met with Ignatius Aphrem II, Patriarch of the Syriac Orthodox Church. The two primates discussed their desire to work toward full communion between their two churches, stating that Antioch and Rome are the only two Apostolic Sees where St. Peter the Apostle had preached. They also expressed an eagerness to celebrate Easter on a common date, as Catholics and Oriental Orthodox have separate days for Easter.

During his papal visit to Armenia in 2016, Pope Francis prayed inside Etchmiadzin Cathedral, the mother church of the Armenian Apostolic Church and the oldest state-built church in the world, alongside the Catholicos of All Armenians, Karekin II. During the prayer service, the Pope asked for and received a blessing from Catholicos Karekin II. The Pope spoke about the Christian faith of the Armenian people and how Armenia became the first nation to accept Christianity as its official religion, even while persecutions under Emperor Diocletian were prevalent in the Roman Empire. The Pope also gave thanks for the relationship between the Catholic Church and the Armenian Apostolic Church and the steps they have taken "for the sake of coming to share fully in the Eucharistic banquet".

In February 2017, the Pope met with Coptic bishops at the Vatican to discuss the violence against and persecution of Christians in the Middle East. His declaration in 2023 that 21 Copts who had died as martyrs in Libya (see 2015 kidnapping and beheading of Copts in Libya) would be added to the Roman Martyrology, was seen as a demonstration of "ecumenism of blood".

=== Assyrian Church of the East ===
Pope Francis has met with the heads of the Assyrian Church of the East: he met with Mar Dinkha IV and, later, with his successor Gewargis III, emphasizing the need of interfaith dialogue and the importance of Christianity in the Middle East, the traditional homeland of the Assyrian people.

=== Protestantism ===
==== Anglicanism ====
Gregory Venables, Anglican bishop of Argentina and former primate of the Anglican Church of the Southern Cone of America, said that Cardinal Bergoglio had told him very clearly that the personal ordinariates established within the Catholic Church for groups of former Anglicans was "quite unnecessary" and that the Catholic Church needed Anglicans as Anglicans. A spokesman for the ordinariates said the words were those of Venables, not the Pope. Pope Francis met for the first time the archbishop of Canterbury, Justin Welby, when he visited the Vatican, on 14 June 2013. The Roman Pontiff said that they both shared the same concerns for social justice, peace and the promotion of Christian values, in matters like marriage. The second meeting took place at the Vatican, on 16 June 2014, with Pope Francis and Justin Welby recommitting themselves to work against modern slavery and human trafficking. Pope Francis has expressed his support for the Anglican realignment, sending through his personal friend, Gregory Venables, a message to the Archbishop Foley Beach of the Anglican Church in North America, a newly formed church outside of the Anglican Communion and not officially recognized by the archbishop of Canterbury, with his "personal greetings and congratulations as he leads his church in the very important job of revival" and asking Venables to embrace him on his behalf. It was presented during Archbishop Beach's enthronement, which took place at the Church of the Apostles in Atlanta, Georgia, on 9 October 2014.

==== Lutheranism ====
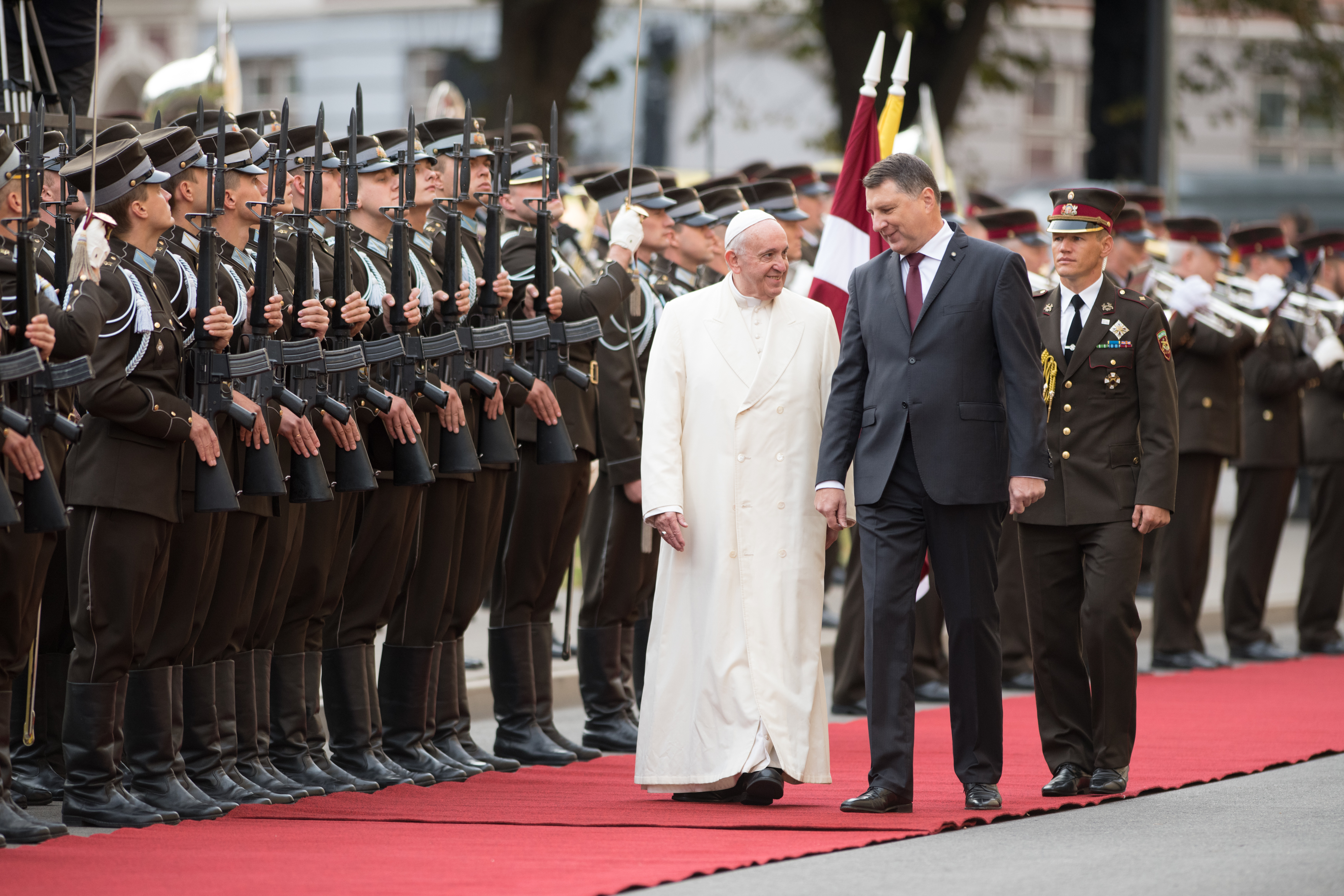
Pope Francis in predominantly Lutheran Latvia, September 2018

On 31 October 2016, Pope Francis commemorated the 499th anniversary of the Reformation with Lutherans in Sweden. This event opened the 500th year (Note: 31 October 2016 was the 499th anniversary of the start of the Reformation.) since the Reformation began with Martin Luther posting his Ninety-five Theses in Wittenberg in 1517. The Pope visited the 950-year-old Lund Cathedral, located in Sweden's southernmost and originally Danish province of Scania. He celebrated an ecumenical liturgy together with the president of the Lutheran World Federation Bishop Dr. Munib Younan. Pope Francis expressed his shared desire with leaders of the Church of Sweden to achieve full communion, but said more ecumenical work needed to be done to work towards communion. The two churches called for focusing on what unites their faith rather than what separates them from each other (Pope Francis previously made a similar treaty with the Orthodox Church.) The following day the Pope conducted a Catholic Mass at a football stadium in Malmö.

In 2013, Mark Hanson, then presiding bishop of the Evangelical Lutheran Church in America (ELCA), greeted the news of Cardinal Bergoglio's election with a public statement that praised his work with Lutherans in Argentina.

==== Methodism ====
On 14 December 2014, Pope Francis became the first pope to host a General of The Salvation Army, the international leader of the Evangelical Methodist denomination The Salvation Army, in a private audience in the Vatican when he met with André Cox. The pope said that "Catholics and Salvationists, together with other Christians, recognise that those in need have a special place in God's heart", as a result they often "meet at the same peripheries of society".

During his papal visit to the Philippines in 2015, the Pope met with Chief Justice Reynato Puno, a United Methodist layman, along with nine other religious leaders and peace advocates to discuss humanitarian relief.

In 2016, Pope Francis met with members of the World Methodist Council, the Methodist Council of Europe, and the Methodist Church in Britain, who were in Rome for the opening of the Methodist Ecumenical Office there. The Pope called for Catholics and Methodists to unite in their Christian beliefs and in service to others. Pope Francis referred to Catholics and Methodists as "truly brothers and sisters" and, reflecting on the words of the Anglican priest and founder of Methodism John Wesley in his Letter to a Roman Catholic, quoted "if we cannot as yet think alike in all things, at least we may love alike".

Also in 2016, Pope Francis met with Gottfried Locher, the President of the Federation of Swiss Protestant Churches to speak about "ecumenism and Protestantism in Europe". The Federation of Swiss Protestant Churches is made up of Calvinist, Zwinglian, and Methodist churches.

==== Evangelicalism ====
Evangelical Christian leaders, including Argentine Luis Palau, welcomed the news of Cardinal Bergoglio's election as pope based on his relations with Evangelical Protestants, noting that Bergoglio's financial manager for the Archdiocese of Buenos Aires was an Evangelical Christian whom Bergoglio refers to as a friend. Palau recounted how Bergoglio would not only relax and "drink mate" with that friend, but would also read the Bible and pray with him, based on what Bergoglio called a relationship of friendship and trust. Palau described Bergoglio's approach to relationships with Evangelicals as one of "building bridges and showing respect, knowing the differences, but majoring on what we can agree on: on the divinity of Jesus, his virgin birth, his resurrection, the second coming". As a result of Bergoglio's election, Palau predicted that "tensions will be eased".

Juan Pablo Bongarrá, president of the Argentine Bible Society, recounted that Bergoglio not only met with Evangelicals and prayed with them, he also asked them to pray for him. Bongarrá noted that Bergoglio would frequently end a conversation with the request, "Pastor, pray for me". Additionally, Bongarrá told the story of a weekly worship meeting of charismatic pastors in Buenos Aires, which Bergoglio attended: "He mounted the platform and called for pastors to pray for him. He knelt in front of nearly 6,000 people, and [the Protestant leaders there] laid hands and prayed".

Other Evangelical Christian leaders agreed that Bergoglio's relationships in Argentina made him "situated to better understand Protestantism" than had his predecessor Pope Benedict, "who often referred to Protestantism as a 'sect' of Christianity". Noting that the divide between Catholicism and Protestantism is often present among members of the same families in Argentina, and is therefore an extremely important human issue, Evangelical author Chris Castaldo said that Francis could set the tone for more compassionate conversations among families about the differences between Protestantism and Catholicism.

Pope Francis also has deepened the relations between the Vatican and the World Evangelical Alliance (WEA). Since the beginning of his term of office, Francis has met repeatedly with representatives of the WEA.

=== Restorationism ===
==== Latter-day Saints ====
In November 2014, three top leaders of the Church of Jesus Christ of Latter-day Saints attended the Vatican's "Humanum: An International Interreligious Colloquium on the Complementarity of Man and Woman"; the presiding bishop of the Church of Jesus Christ of Latter-day Saints Gérald Caussé, the First Counselor in the First Presidency of the Church Henry B. Eyring, and L. Tom Perry, a member of the Quorum of the Twelve Apostles. Catholic leaders and leaders of The Church of Jesus Christ of Latter-day Saints reaffirmed their shared beliefs in the centrality of marriage and families in society. Pope Francis shook hands with Henry B. Eyring, who was one of the 30 speakers chosen for the event. The interaction was the first time a Pope and a leader from The Church of Jesus Christ of Latter-day Saints had met face-to-face.

On 9 March 2019, Church President Russell M. Nelson and Acting President of the Quorum of the Twelve Apostles M. Russell Ballard met with Pope Francis in a 33-minute interview at the Vatican. The event marked the first time in history that a pope and a president of The Church of Jesus Christ of Latter-day Saints met face-to-face. In talking about the meeting, President Nelson said, "We had a most cordial, unforgettable experience. His Holiness, he was most gracious and warm and welcoming". President Nelson also stated, "We talked about our mutual concern for the people who suffer throughout the world and want to relieve human suffering. We talked about the importance of religious liberty, the importance of the family, our mutual concern for the youth [and] for the secularization of the world and the need for people to come to God and worship Him, pray to Him and have the stability that faith in Jesus Christ will bring in their lives". In addressing the differences between the churches, President Nelson remarked, "The differences in doctrine are real....They are important. But they are not nearly as important as things we have in common – our concern for human suffering, our desire for and the importance of religious liberty for all of society, and the importance of building bridges of friendship instead of building walls of segregation". The meeting took place the day before the Rome Italy Temple of The Church of Jesus Christ of Latter-day Saints was dedicated.

== Interfaith dialogue ==
Pope Francis has written about his commitment to open and respectful interfaith dialogue as a way for all parties engaged in that dialogue to learn from one another. In the 2011 book that records his conversations with Rabbi Abraham Skorka, On Heaven and Earth, Pope Francis said:

Dialogue is born from an attitude of respect for the other person, from a conviction that the other person has something good to say. It assumes that there is room in the heart for the person's point of view, opinion, and proposal. Dialogue entails a cordial reception, not a prior condemnation. To dialogue it is necessary to know how to lower the defenses, open the doors of the house, and offer human warmth.

Religious leaders in Buenos Aires have mentioned that Pope Francis promoted interfaith ceremonies at the Buenos Aires Metropolitan Cathedral. For example, in November 2012 he brought leaders of the Jewish, Muslim, Evangelical, and Orthodox Christian faiths together to pray for a peaceful solution to the Middle East conflicts. Rabbi Alejandro Avruj praised Bergoglio's interest in interfaith dialogue and his commitment to mend religious divisions.

Shortly after his election, the pope called for more interreligious dialogue as a way of "building bridges" and establishing "true links of friendship between all people". He added that it was crucial "to intensify outreach to nonbelievers, so that the differences which divide and hurt us may never prevail". He said that his title of "pontiff" means "builder of bridges", and that it was his wish that "the dialogue between us should help to build bridges connecting all people, in such a way that everyone can see in the other not an enemy, not a rival, but a brother or sister to be welcomed and embraced".

On 24 May 2014, Pope Francis arrived in Jordan, at the start of a tour of the Middle East, "aiming to boost ties with Muslims and Jews as well as easing an age-old rift within Christianity".

In a 2016 survey, Francis was viewed favorably by almost two-thirds of Jews, as well as majorities of Protestants and the irreligious; minorities of Buddhists and Muslims had favorable views of him.

=== Judaism ===
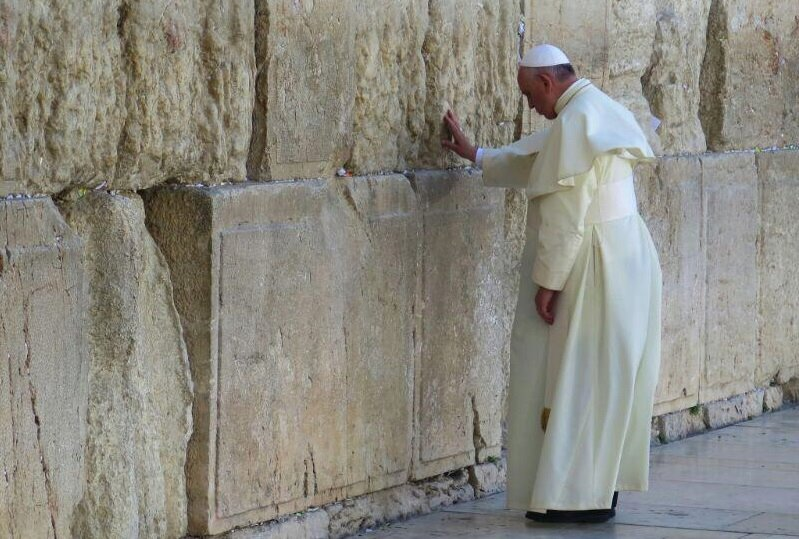
Francis praying at the Western Wall in Jerusalem on his 2014 visit to the Holy Land

Pope Francis has close ties to the Jewish community of Argentina, and attended Rosh Hashanah (Jewish new year) services in 2007 at a synagogue in Buenos Aires. He told the Jewish congregation during his visit that he went to the synagogue to examine his heart, "like a pilgrim, together with you, my elder brothers". After the 1994 AMIA bombing of a Jewish Community Center that killed 85 people, Bergoglio was the first public figure to sign a petition condemning the attack and calling for justice. Jewish community leaders around the world noted that his words and actions "showed solidarity with the Jewish community" in the aftermath of this attack.

A former head of the World Jewish Congress, Israel Singer, reported that he worked with Bergoglio in the early 2000s, distributing aid to the poor as part of a joint Jewish–Catholic program called "Tzedaká". Singer noted that he was impressed with Bergoglio's modesty, remembering that "if everyone sat in chairs with handles [arms], he would sit in the one without". Bergoglio also co-hosted a Kristallnacht memorial ceremony at the Buenos Aires Metropolitan Cathedral in 2012, and joined a group of clerics from a number of different religions to light candles in a 2012 synagogue ceremony on the occasion of the Jewish festival of Hanukkah.

Pope Francis blessed the cornerstone for the building of the museum devoted to wartime Polish rescuers of Jews which is being built in the Polish village of Markowa; where the family of Józef and Wiktoria Ulma, who are now Servants of God as the Vatican is studying their cause for sainthood, were shot by the Germans for hiding their Jewish neighbors.

Abraham Skorka, the rector of the Latin-American Rabbinical Seminary in Buenos Aires, and Bergoglio published their conversations on religious and philosophical subjects as Sobre el cielo y la tierra (On Heaven and Earth). An editorial in Israel's Jerusalem Post notes that "Unlike John Paul II, who as a child had positive memories of the Jews of his native Poland but due to the Holocaust had no Jewish community to interact with in Poland as an adult, Pope Francis has maintained a sustained and very positive relationship with a living, breathing [Jewish] community in Buenos Aires". The Pope has a warm and long-standing relationship with Chief Rabbi Isaac Sacca.

One of the pope's first official actions was writing a letter to Rabbi Riccardo Di Segni, the Chief Rabbi of Rome, inviting him to the papal installation and sharing his hope of collaboration between the Catholic and Jewish communities. Addressing representatives of Jewish organizations and communities, Francis said that, "due to our common roots [a] Christian cannot be anti-Semitic!"

Francis had a warm relationship with Israeli President Shimon Peres, who visited the pope in April 2013 and invited him to Israel. Francis traveled to Israel in May 2014 and met with Peres at the presidential residence. During his trip, Francis invited both Peres and Palestinian president Mahmoud Abbas to join him in Rome to "pray for peace", which Peres and Abbas did in June 2014. After leaving the presidency, Peres visited Francis again in Rome in September 2014 and June 2016.

=== Islam ===
Muslim leaders in Buenos Aires welcomed the news of Cardinal Bergoglio's election as pope, noting that he "always showed himself as a friend of the Islamic community", and a person whose position is "pro-dialogue". They praised Bergoglio's close ties with Muslim groups and noted his comments when Pope Benedict's 2006 Regensburg lecture was interpreted by many as denigrating Islam. According to them, Bergoglio immediately distanced himself from Benedict's language and said that statements which provoked outrage with Muslims would "serve to destroy in 20 seconds the careful construction of a relationship with Islam that Pope John Paul II built over the last 20 years".

Cardinal Bergoglio visited both a mosque and an Islamic school in Argentina; visits that the Director for the Diffusion of Islam, Sheik Mohsen Ali, called actions that strengthened the relationship between the Catholic and Islamic communities. Sumer Noufouri, Secretary General of the Islamic Center of the Argentine Republic (CIRA), added that for Muslims, Bergoglio's past actions make his election as pope a cause of "joy and expectation of strengthening dialogue between religions". Noufouri said that the relationship between CIRA and Bergoglio over the course of a decade had helped to build up Christian–Muslim dialogue in a way that was "really significant in the history of monotheistic relations in Argentina".

Ahmed el-Tayeb, Grand Imam of al-Azhar and president of Egypt's Al-Azhar University, sent congratulations after the pope's election. Al-Tayeb had "broken off relations with the Vatican" during Benedict XVI's time as pope; his message of congratulations also included the request that "Islam asks for respect from the new pontiff".

Shortly after his election, in a meeting with ambassadors from the 180 countries accredited with the Holy See, Pope Francis called for more interreligious dialogue – "particularly with Islam". He also expressed gratitude that "so many civil and religious leaders from the Islamic world" had attended his installation Mass. An editorial in the Saudi Arabian paper Saudi Gazette strongly welcomed the pope's call for increased interfaith dialogue, stressing that while the pope was "reiterating a position he has always maintained", his public call as pope for increased dialogue with Islam "comes as a breath of fresh air at a time when much of the Western world is experiencing a nasty outbreak of Islamophobia".

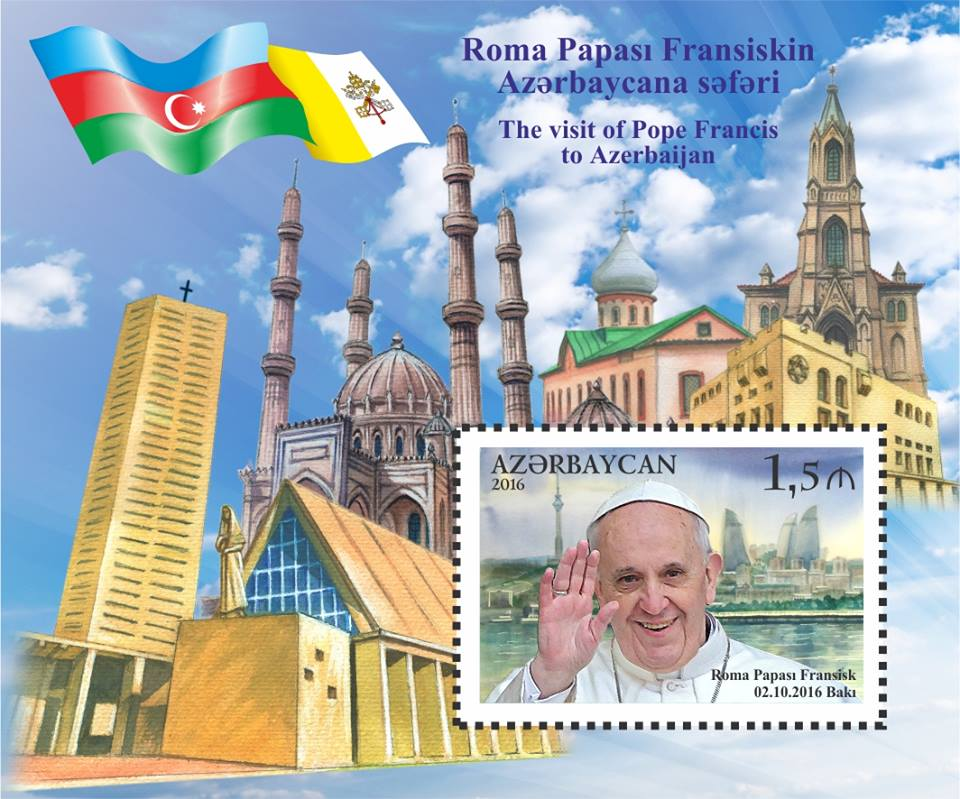
Stamp dedicated to the pastoral visit of Francis to Azerbaijan on 2 October 2016

In 2016, Pope Francis met with Ahmed el-Tayeb at the Vatican, the first meeting since 2000 between the Grand Imam of al-Azhar and the leader of the world's Catholics.

In the aftermath of the 2016 Normandy church attack, whereby two Islamic terrorists affiliated with ISIS murdered the 85-year-old Catholic priest Jacques Hamel by slitting his throat, Pope Francis made public statements saying, "It's not right to identify Islam with violence. It's not right and it's not true. [...] If I speak of Islamic violence, then I have to speak of Catholic violence". According to the BBC, this received a French backlash on social media, as the hashtag #PasMonPape ("Not My Pope") became the number one trend on Twitter in France.

On 3 February 2019, Pope Francis visited the Arabian Peninsula on a trip to Abu Dhabi, United Arab Emirates. During the visit he met Grand Imam of al-Azhar Ahmed el-Tayeb and held papal Mass to more than 120,000 attendees in the Zayed Sports City Stadium. Pope Francis also signed, alongside the Grand Imam, the Document on Human Fraternity for World Peace and Living Together, a document which pledges world peace and living together between people of different faiths.

=== Buddhism ===
In 2014, Pope Francis declined to meet with Tenzin Gyatso, the 14th Dalai Lama, after the Dalai Lama, who was visiting Rome, had requested a papal audience. Vatican officials assured the press and Buddhist leaders that Pope Francis held the Dalai Lama "in very high regard", but was concerned that the meeting of the two spiritual leaders could jeopardize the Vatican's efforts to improve their relationship with China. In speaking critically of the progress of the negotiations, in October 2017 Cardinal Joseph Zen, former bishop of Hong Kong, said the Pope "does not understand the Communist Party at all" and that the Chinese Communist Party government had failed to make any concessions.

In January 2015 during the papal visit to Sri Lanka, Pope Francis made an unscheduled stop at a Buddhist temple in Colombo where he was shown sacred Buddhist relics that are normally only viewed once a year, and listened to singing and devotional music. Earlier that week, Francis had met with Buddhist, Hindu, Muslim and Christian leaders in Sri Lanka and said "religious beliefs must never be allowed to be abused in the cause of violence and war".

On 24 June 2015, dialogue between Buddhist and Catholic religious and social leaders began in the Vatican, hosted by the Pontifical Council for Interreligious Dialogue and the United States Conference of Catholic Bishops. Pope Francis attended the meeting, where he spoke in favor of Buddhists and Catholics working together to address social problems. Pope Francis received a Buddhist blessing while at the meeting.

=== Sikhi ===
During his first visit to the United States, Pope Francis shared a stage with Gunisha Kaur, a Sikh-American human rights researcher whose father survived the 1984 anti-Sikh riots in Punjab, at the site of the 9/11 Memorial to advocate for tolerance and common humanity. Pope Francis also met with Kaur's father, Dr. Satpal Singh, co-founder of the Sikh Council for Interfaith Relations and former chairperson for the World Sikh Council (America Region), who has advocated for diversity and peace-making and has been an active proponent of Catholic-Sikh relations.

Religious studies scholar and activist Simran Jeet Singh said the meeting "aligns with the pope's view that faith has the power to bring people together – especially in response to violence and hate, and it's also especially meaningful for those in the minority community, such as Sikhs, for whom 9/11 was a watershed moment in more than one way".

== Attitudes about non-believers ==
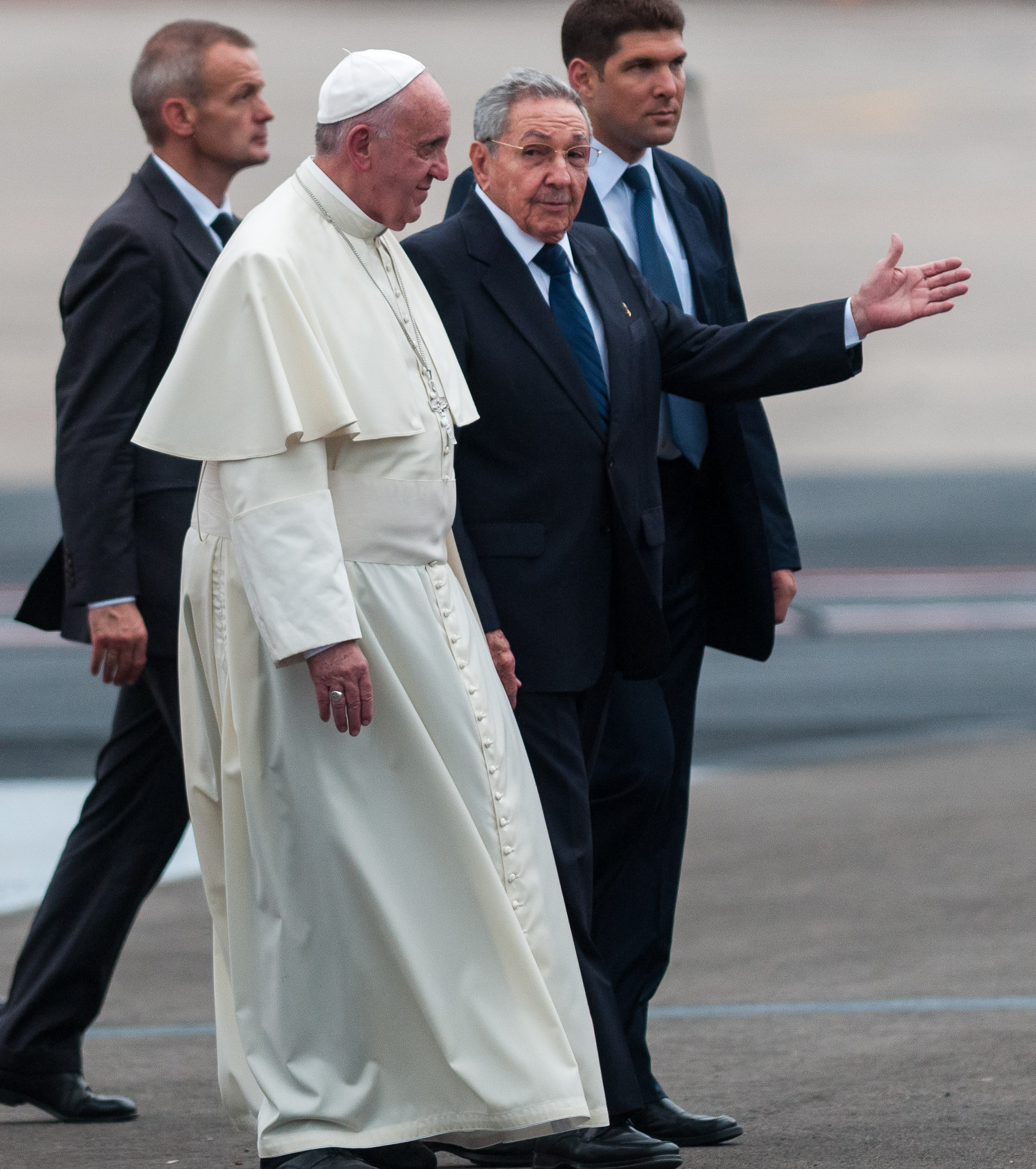
Pope Francis with Cuban leader Raúl Castro, September 2015

Speaking to journalists and media employees on 16 March 2013, Pope Francis said he would bless everyone silently, "given that many of you do not belong to the Catholic Church, and others are not believers". In his papal address on 20 March, he said the "attempt to eliminate God and the Divine from the horizon of humanity" resulted in violence, but described as well his feelings about nonbelievers: "[W]e also sense our closeness to all those men and women who, although not identifying themselves as followers of any religious tradition, are nonetheless searching for truth, goodness and beauty, the truth, goodness and beauty of God. They are our valued allies in the commitment to defending human dignity, in building a peaceful coexistence between peoples and in safeguarding and caring for creation".

In May 2013, Francis said all who do good can be redeemed through Jesus, including atheists. Francis said "(God) has redeemed all of us, all of us, with the Blood of Christ: all of us, not just Catholics. Everyone! Even the atheists. Everyone!" Amid the ensuant controversy, Carl E. Olson said Francis's words were fundamental Christian teaching dating back to the Apostle Paul. A spokesman for the Vatican, Father Thomas Rosica, issued an "explanatory note" that non-Catholics who "know" the Catholic Church but do not convert "cannot be saved", and only those who "sincerely seek God […] can attain eternal salvation". Hendrik Hertzberg criticized Rosica (who was later dismissed as a plagiarist) in The New Yorker magazine, and speculated that there may be major internal disagreement between supporters and opponents of Vatican II in the Catholic Church.

In September 2013, Francis wrote a letter to Italian journalist Eugenio Scalfari, saying non-believers would be forgiven by God if they followed their consciences. Responding to a list of questions published in his newspaper by Scalfari, who is not a Catholic, Francis wrote: "you ask if the God of Christians forgives those who do not believe and who do not seek faith. Given the premise, and this is fundamental, that the mercy of God is limitless for those who turn to him with a sincere and contrite heart, the issue for the unbeliever lies in obeying his or her conscience".
