= Awa III =

Current Catholicos-Patriarch of the Assyrian Church of the East

His Holiness Mar Mar Awa III
- Catholicos-Patriarch of the Assyrian Church of the East
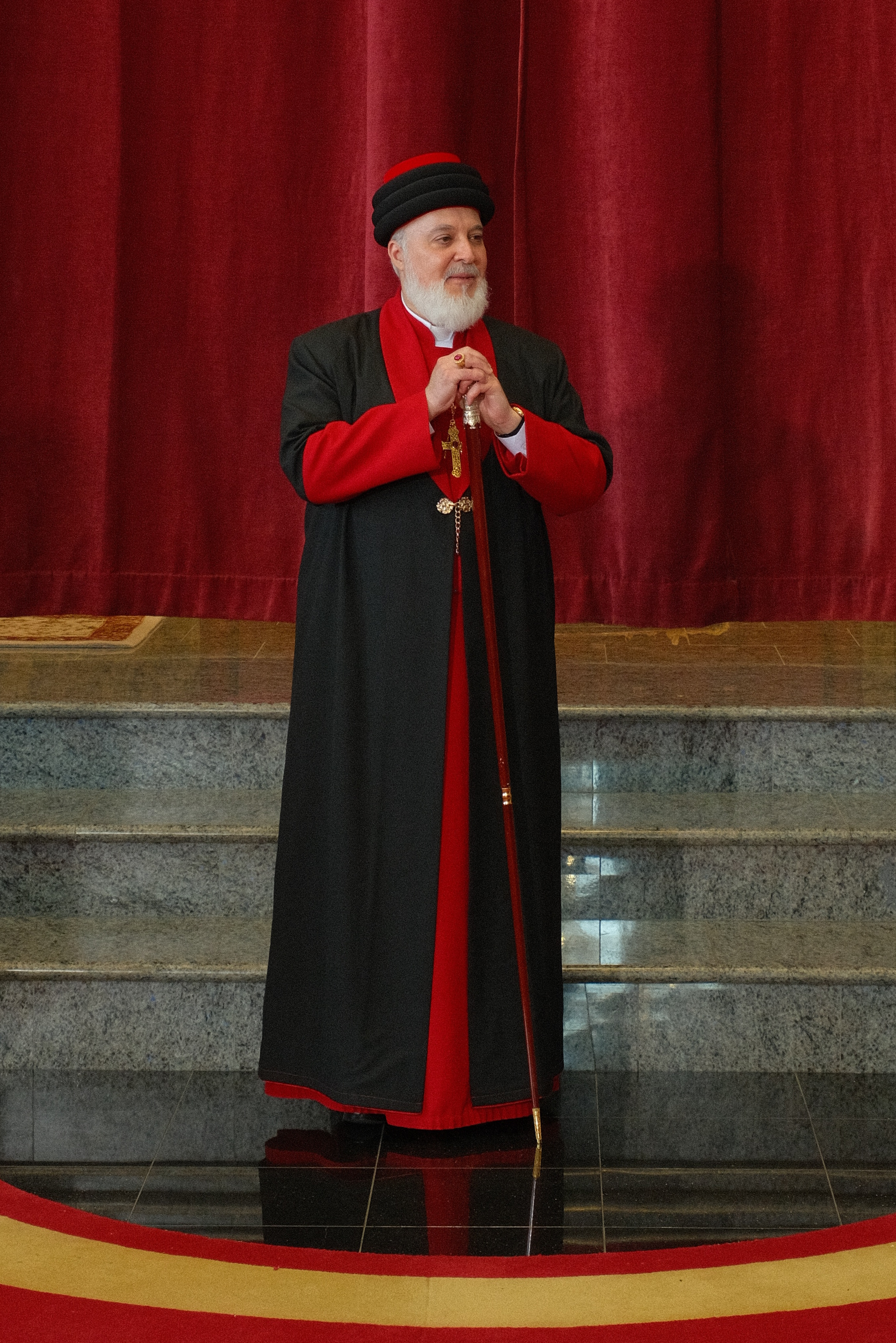
- Mar Awa III in 2025
- Church: Assyrian Church of the East ܥܕܬܐ ܕܡܕܢܚܐ ܕܐܬܘܖ̈ܝܐ
- See: Holy Apostolic See of Seleucia-Ctesiphon
- Appointed: 8 September 2021
- Installed: 13 September 2021
- Predecessor: Gewargis III
- Previous post: Bishop of California Secretary of the Holy Synod Archdeacon of the Diocese of California

Orders
- Ordination: 23 May 1999
- Consecration: 30 November 2008, Modesto, California, U.S. by Mar Dinkha IV
- Rank: Catholicos Patriarch

Personal details
- Born: David Royel; 4 July 1975 (age 51) Chicago, Illinois, U.S.
- Denomination: Assyrian Church of the East
- Residence: Erbil, Iraq
- Occupation: Cleric
- Education: Loyola University Chicago (BA); University of St. Mary of the Lake (BA); Pontifical Oriental Institute (STL, STD)

Ordination history of Mar Awa III
History
Diaconal ordination
- Ordained by: Mar Dinkha IV
- Date: 19 January 1992
- Place: Assyrian Church of the East Cathedral Church of St. George, Chicago, Illinois
Priestly ordination
- Ordained by: Mar Dinkha IV
- Date: 23 May 1999
- Place: Assyrian Church of the East Cathedral Church of St. George, Chicago, Illinois
Episcopal consecration
- Consecrated by: Mar Dinkha IV
- Date: 30 November 2008
- Place: Assyrian Church of the East Cathedral Church of Mar Zaia, Modesto, California, U.S.

Mar Awa III (born David Royel; 4 July 1975) is an Assyrian-American prelate currently serving as Catholicos-Patriarch of the Assyrian Church of the East, headquartered in Erbil. He previously served as the secretary of the Holy Synod, is one of five trustees of the Assyrian Church of the East Relief Organization (ACERO), and is president of both the Commission on Inter-Church Relations and Educational Development (CIRED) and of the National Executive Committee (NEC) of the Assyrian Church of the East Youth Association (ACEYA) of the United States of America.

== Early life ==
David Royel was born on 4 July 1975 in Chicago, Illinois, to Koresh and Flourence Royel. He is a first-generation Assyrian American. His involvement in the Assyrian Church of the East began at a very young age. At 16, he was ordained as a subdeacon, and the following year became a deacon. He was ordained by Mar Dinkha IV. Both ordinations took place at Mar Gewargis Cathedral (St. George Cathedral) in Chicago.

=== Education ===
David Royel obtained his bachelor's degree from Loyola University Chicago in 1997 and went on to achieve his second bachelor's degree of Sacred Theology from University of St. Mary of the Lake in 1999. He later received his Licentiate and Doctorate of Sacred Theology from the Pontifical Oriental Institute in Rome.

== Service as Cor-Bishop ==
David Royel was ordained as Cor-Bishop on 15 July 2006 by Mar Dinkha IV at Mar Gewargis Cathedral in Chicago, Illinois, and as Archdeacon by Mar Dinkha IV on 23 November 2008 in Mar Yosip Khnanisho Church in San Jose, California.

== Tenure as Bishop ==
On 30 November 2008, David Royel was elevated to the rank of Bishop, taking the name Mar Awa Royel – in Assyrian, Awa means father. He is the first American-born Bishop of the Assyrian Church of the East. Mar Awa was again consecrated by the Patriarch Mar Dinkha IV, assisted by Mar Sargis Yousip, Bishop of Iraq, Mar Aprim Khamis, Bishop of the Western United States, and Mar Odisho Oraham, Bishop of Europe. The ordination ceremony took place at St. Zaia Church in Modesto, California, attended by over 2,500 members of the Assyrian Church of the East, and broadcast on Assyrian National Broadcast.

As of 2015, Mar Awa has served as the Secretary of the Holy Synod of the Assyrian Church of the East.

Under his tenure, Mar Awa established the St. Issac of Nineveh Monastery in California in addition to the tonsuring and clothing of two monks. This is the only active monastery in the Church worldwide.

=== Advocacy ===
As Bishop, Mar Awa has made many attempts to raise awareness for the plight of the persecuted Christians of the Middle East. In September 2014, he spoke at the inaugural In Defense of Christians Summit in Washington DC.

On 9 March 2015, Deputy National Security Advisor for Strategic Communications Ben Rhodes met with Mar Awa as well as Mar Paulus Benjamin. Together, the Bishops briefed Rhodes on the dire situation facing Christian communities in Iraq and Syria. They also discussed the crisis along the Khabour River in northeastern Syria, where the terrorist organization ISIL had attacked in late February 2015, which led to thousands of displaced people and a hostage crisis. Rhodes condemned ISIL's targeting of religious minorities, and outlined the Administration's plan to protect and aid the civilians impacted by the terrorist organization.

== Election as Catholicos-Patriarch ==
On 6 September 2021, Mar Gewargis III formally stepped down as Catholicos-Patriarch during an Extraordinary Session of the Holy Synod of the Assyrian Church of the East, leaving the Patriarchal See vacant. On 8 September 2021, the Holy Synod elected Mar Awa Royel, Bishop of California and Secretary of the Holy Synod, to succeed Mar Gewargis III as the 122nd Catholicos-Patriarch of the Assyrian Church of the East. This was a historic decision as Mar Awa was the first Western-born Catholicos-Patriarch. He was consecrated and enthroned as Catholicos-Patriarch on 13 September 2021, on the Feast of the Holy Cross, in the Cathedral Church of St. John the Baptist in Erbil, Iraq, and assumed the ecclesiastical name Mar Awa III.

== Publications ==
In 2011, Mar Awa published a treatise on the theology of the Assyrian Church of the East regarding the seven Holy Sacraments, titled Mysteries of the Kingdom: The Sacraments of the Assyrian Church of the East.

Assyrian Church of the East titles
Preceded by Gewargis III	Catholicos-Patriarch of the Assyrian Church of the East; 2021–	Succeeded by Incumbent
