= Gewargis III =

21st-century Patriarch of the Assyrian Church of the East

His Holiness Mar Gewargis III ܡܪܝ ܓܝܘܪܓܝܣ ܬܠܝܬܝܐ
- Catholicos-Patriarch of the Assyrian Church of the East
- Church: Assyrian Church of the East ܥܕܬܐ ܕܡܕܢܚܐ ܕܐܬܘܖ̈ܝܐ
- Diocese: Patriarchal Diocese of Iraq
- See: Holy Apostolic See of Seleucia-Ctesiphon
- Appointed: 18 September 2015
- Installed: 27 September 2015, Cathedral of St. John the Baptist, Erbil, Iraq
- Term ended: 6 September 2021
- Predecessor: Mar Dinkha IV
- Successor: Mar Awa III
- Previous post: Metropolitan of Baghdad (1981–2015)

Orders
- Ordination: 8 June 1980
- Consecration: 7 June 1981, Chicago, Illinois by Mar Dinkha IV
- Rank: Metropolitan

Personal details
- Born: Warda Daniel Sliwa; 23 November 1941 (age 84) Habbaniya, Anbar Province, Kingdom of Iraq (present-day Iraq)
- Denomination: Assyrian Church of the East
- Residence: Baghdad, Iraq
- Parents: Daniel Sliwa and Mariam Sliwa
- Occupation: Cleric
- Education: University of Baghdad

Ordination history of Mar Gewargis III
History
Diaconal ordination
- Ordained by: Mar Dinkha IV
- Date: 13 April 1980
- Place: Assyrian Church of the East Cathedral Church of St. George, Chicago, Illinois
Priestly ordination
- Ordained by: Mar Dinkha IV
- Date: 8 June 1980
- Place: Assyrian Church of the East Cathedral Church of St. George, Chicago, Illinois
Episcopal consecration
- Principal consecrator: Mar Dinkha IV
- Co-consecrators: Mar Aprim Khamis
- Date: 7 June 1981
- Place: Assyrian Church of the East Cathedral Church of St. George, Chicago, Illinois

Mar Gewargis III (Syriac: ܡܪܝ ܓܝܘܪܓܝܣ ܬܠܝܬܝܐ; born Warda Daniel Sliwa, Syriac: ܘܪܕܐ ܕܢܝܐܝܠ ܨܠܝܒܐ) served as the Catholicos-Patriarch of the Assyrian Church of the East between 2015 and 2021.

On 18 September 2015, the Holy Synod of the Assyrian Church of the East elected Mar Gewargis Sliwa to succeed the late Mar Dinkha IV as the head of the Church. On 27 September 2015, he was formally consecrated and enthroned as Catholicos-Patriarch.

== Early life ==
Warda Daniel Sliwa was born on 23 November 1941, in Habbaniya, Iraq, to Daniel and Mariam Sliwa. In 1964, he matriculated from the School of Education, a federated college of the University of Baghdad. Following this, he taught English in various schools in Iraq for the next thirteen years.

During a visit to the United States he was called by the Catholicos-Patriarch, Mar Dinkha IV, to serve the Assyrian Church of the East in the ordained ministry. After training in the rites and theology of the Church, he was ordained to the diaconate on 13 April 1980, and on 8 June 1980 he was ordained to the priesthood. Warda Daniel Sliwa continued to serve and train within the Church, until he was nominated by Catholicos-Patriarch Mar Dinkha IV and the hierarchy of the Assyrian Church of the East to assume the rank of Metropolitan for Baghdad and all Iraq. Thus, he would eventually succeed the Metropolitan Mar Yosip Khnanisho, who had died in 1977.

On Pentecost Sunday, 7 June 1981, Rev. Sliwa was consecrated as Metropolitan of Baghdad and all Iraq by Mar Dinkha IV, with the assistance of Mar Aprim Khamis, in the Cathedral Church of St. George, Chicago. The new Metropolitan was given the ecclesiastical name Mar Gewargis III.

== Episcopal career ==
During Gewargis's metropolitanship he established the archdiocesan minor seminary in Baghdad, which produced numerous priests and deacons for Iraq. Some of the students were sent to Europe for doctoral studies in theology. In 1994, after the fall of the USSR, Metropolitan Gewargis began a mission to the Assyrians in the Russian Federation, establishing a number of mission parishes. In that year, a permanent priest was assigned for the newly established parish of St. Mary in Moscow. The newly built church, in honour of St. Mary, was then consecrated. The number of deacons and priests for the Assyrian Church of the East in Russia increased.

In 1998 he travelled to China and made contact with the Christian communities there. He visited some of the ancient relics of the Assyrian Church of the East, which have been present in China since the establishment of missions to China in the early history of the Church of the East. Gewargis also made historical visits to the regions of Mardin and Hakkâri, now in southern Turkey, where there are many relics of the Assyrian Church of the East dating back to the early history of the Church. Metropolitan Gewargis established a library within the Metropolitan's residence, which now houses hundreds of ancient manuscripts. While in Baghdad, he established the Metropolitan's Press, and had a number of liturgical books and other volumes of a catechetical nature printed for worldwide use. In 2009 he established the Urhai (Edessa) private elementary school in Baghdad.

Gewargis has been active in ecumenical forums and fraternal exchange between the Assyrian Church of the East, and other eastern churches and ecclesiastical organisations, in particular with the Middle East Council of Churches (MECC) and the Council of the Heads of Churches in Baghdad.

== Election and consecration as Catholicos-Patriarch ==
Between 16–18 September 2015, the Council of Prelates of the Assyrian Church of the East met in a Synod in the Cathedral Church of St. John the Baptist in Erbil, Iraq. On 18 September 2015, the Prelates elected Mar Gewargis Sliwa as the 121st Catholicos-Patriarch of the Holy See of Seleucia-Ctesiphon. On 27 September 2015 he was consecrated and enthroned as Catholicos-Patriarch in the Church, with Mar Aprem Mooken, Metropolitan of Malabar and India, and Mar Meelis Zaia, Metropolitan of Australia, New Zealand and Lebanon presiding. Mar Gewargis Sliwa formally assumed the ecclesiastical name Mar Gewargis III.

On 6 September 2021, Mar Gewargis III formally stepped down as Catholicos-Patriarch during an Extraordinary Session of the Holy Synod of the Assyrian Church of the East, leaving the Patriarchal See vacant. On 8 September 2021, the Holy Synod elected Mar Awa III Royel, Bishop of California and Secretary of the Holy Synod, to succeed Mar Gewargis III as Catholicos-Patriarch of the Assyrian Church of the East.

Assyrian Church of the East titles
Preceded by Mar Dinkha IV	Catholicos-Patriarch of the Assyrian Church of the East; 2015–2021	Succeeded by Mar Awa IIl
