= Darbandokeh =

Darbandokeh دەربەندۆک
- Location in Kurdistan Region, Iraq Darbandokeh (Iraq)
- Coordinates: 36.58343°N 44.31153°E
- Country: Iraq
- Region: Kurdistan Region
- Governorate: Erbil
- District: Shaqlawa
- Time zone: AST (UTC+3)

Darbandokeh is a village in Erbil Governorate in Kurdistan Region, Iraq. (Note: (Arabic: دربيدونكه; Kurdish: دەربەندۆک). Alternatively transliterated as Darbandoke or Derbandok.) It is located in the Shaqlawa District.

== Etymology ==
The name of the village is derived from "enclosed place" in Kurdish.

== History ==
Darbandokeh was founded in 1928 by Assyrians from the refugee camp at Baqubah in the aftermath of the Assyrian genocide in the First World War, most of whom belonged to the Nochiya clan from Shemsdin in the Hakkari mountains in Turkey. By 1938, the village was inhabited by 108 Assyrians in 15 families. There was a church of Mar Quryaqos.

In 1963, amidst the First Iraqi–Kurdish War, Darbandokeh was attacked and its Assyrian population was either killed or expelled by pro-government Kurds, who subsequently resettled the village, and the church of Mar Quryaqos was also destroyed.

== Notable people ==
- Dinkha IV (1935–2015), Catholicos-Patriarch of the Assyrian Church of the East
- Emanuel Kamber (b. 1949), Assyrian-American physicist

== Bibliography ==
- Donabed, Sargon George (2015). Reforging a Forgotten History: Iraq and the Assyrians in the Twentieth Century. Edinburgh University Press.
