= Holiness (style) =

Religious treatment pronoun

The style His Holiness (and the associated form of address Your Holiness) is an official title or style referring to the Pope in the Catholic Church; this use can be traced back several hundred years. It has also been adopted as an official title for other leaders in a number of religious traditions. It is used to refer to Oriental Orthodox Patriarchs and used to refer to religious leaders in Islam, Buddhism, and Bon. Buddhist leaders referred to this way include the Dalai Lama, the Menri Trizin, among others; the Da'i al-Mutlaq of the Dawoodi Bohras is one example of a Muslim leader styled this way.

== Christianity ==
=== Catholic Church ===
Papal styles of Holiness (style)
- Reference style: His Holiness
- Spoken style: Your Holiness
- Religious style: Holy Father

His Holiness (Latin: Sanctitas) is the official style used to address the Pope.

The full papal title, rarely used, is:

His Holiness Leo XIV, Bishop of Rome, Vicar of Jesus Christ, Successor of the Prince of the Apostles, Supreme Pontiff of the Universal Church, Patriarch of the West, Primate of Italy, Archbishop and Metropolitan of the Roman Province, Sovereign of the Vatican City State, Servant of the servants of God.

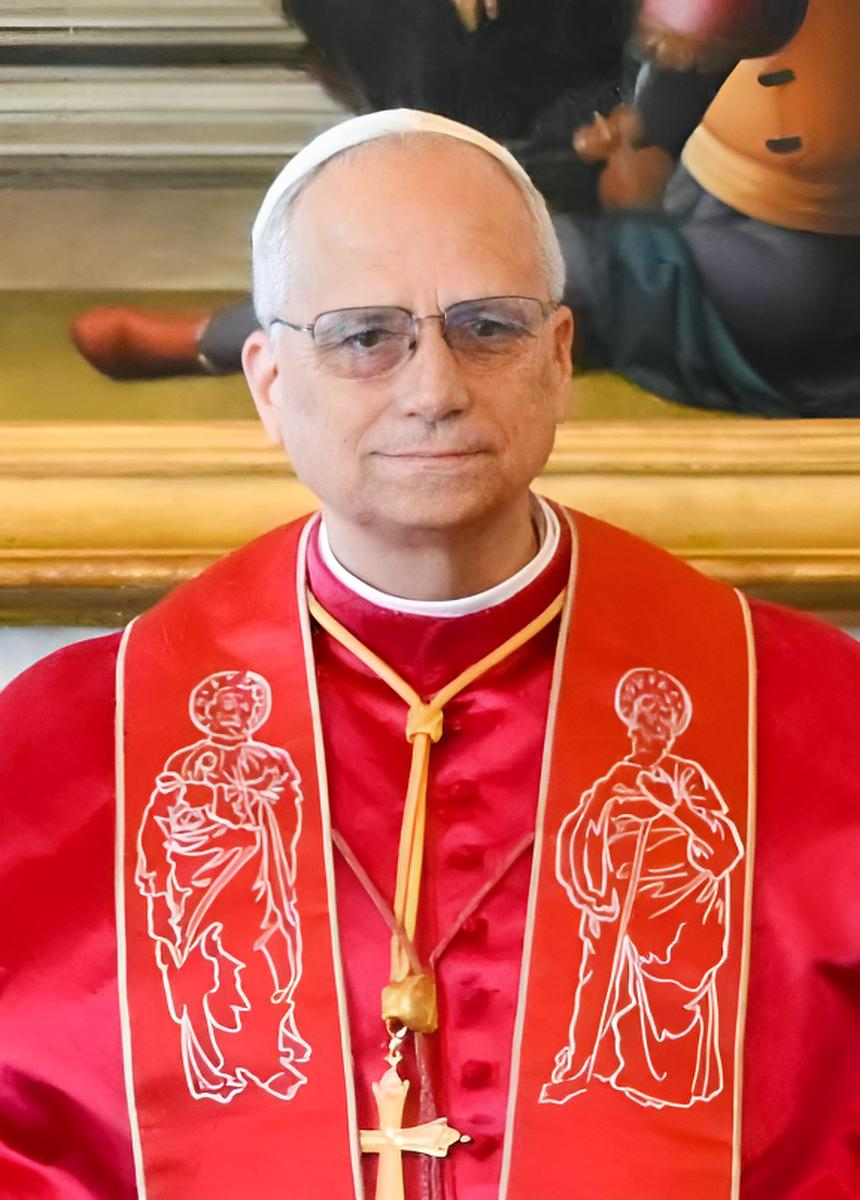
Pope Leo XIV (b. 1955)

The best-known title, that of "Pope", does not appear in the official list of titles, but is commonly used in the titles of documents and appears, in abbreviated form, in their signatures as "PP", standing for Papa (Pope). The 2020 Annuario Pontificio lists all of his formal titles, except Bishop of Rome, as "historical titles".

It is customary when referring to popes to translate the regnal name into local languages.

In February 2013, the Holy See announced that former Pope Benedict XVI would retain the style "His Holiness" after resigning and becoming Pope Emeritus.

The term is sometimes abbreviated as "HH" or "H.H." when confusion with "His/Her Highness" is unlikely.

=== Eastern and Oriental Orthodox churches ===
His Holiness is the official style also used to address the Oriental Orthodox Patriarchs. In the Eastern Orthodox Church, the Ecumenical Patriarch of Constantinople has the title of His All Holiness (Greek: Παναγιώτατος). It is also used for certain other Eastern patriarchs, notably those who head a church or rite which recognizes neither Rome's nor Constantinople's primacy.

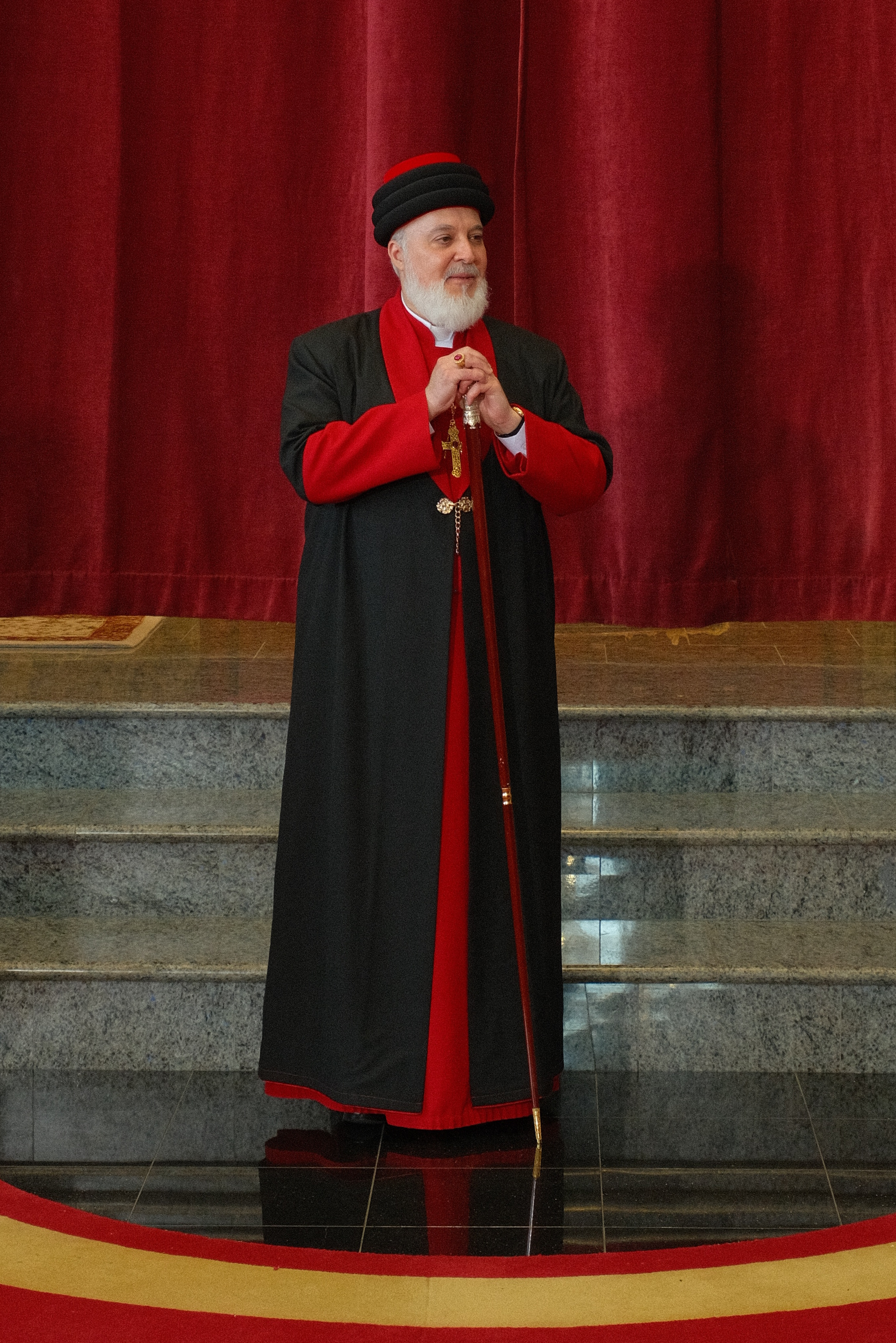
Awa III, Patriarch of the Assyrian Church of the East (b. 1975)

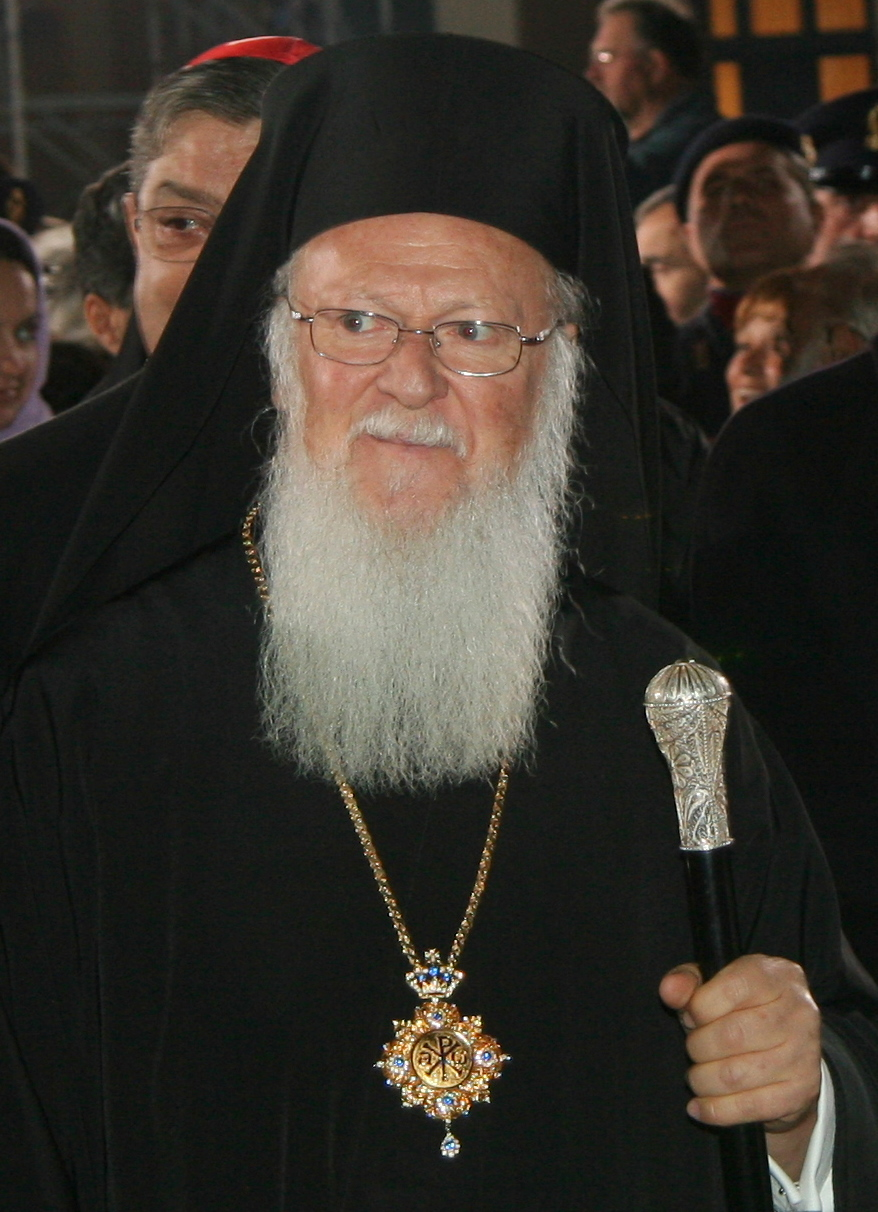
Ecumenical Patriarchate of Constantinople, Bartholomew I
(b. 1940)

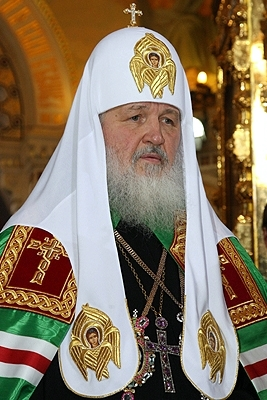
Patriarch Kirill of Moscow
(b. 1946)

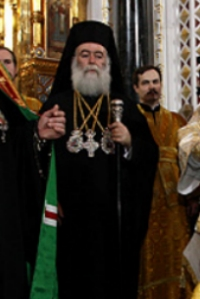
Patriarch of Alexandria Theodore II
(b. 1954)

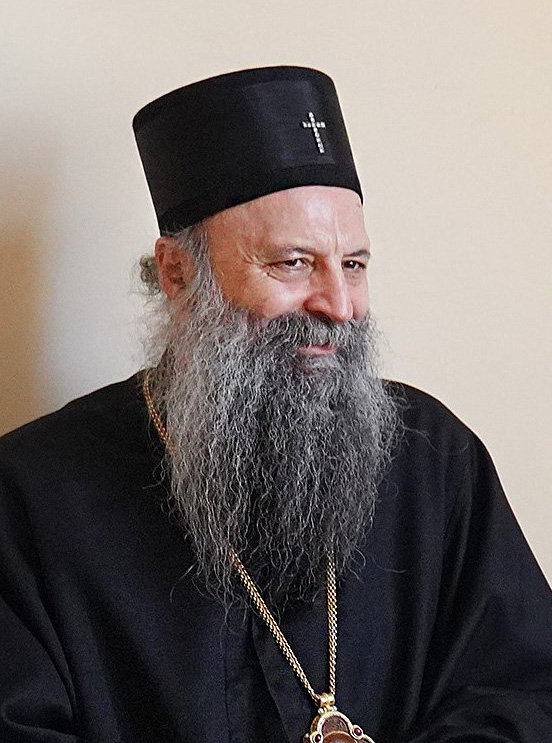
Serbian Patriarch Porfirije (b. 1961)

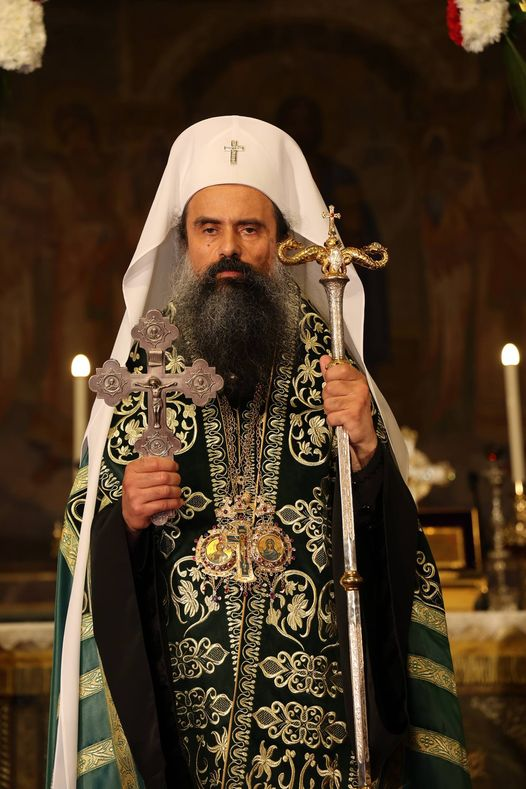
Patriarch Daniil of Bulgaria (b. 1972)

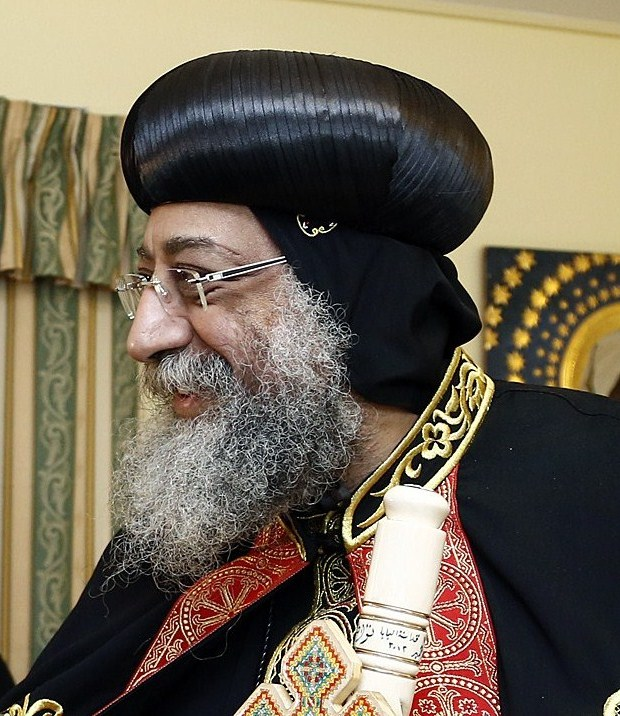
Pope Tawadros II of Alexandria of the Coptic Orthodox Church (b. 1952)

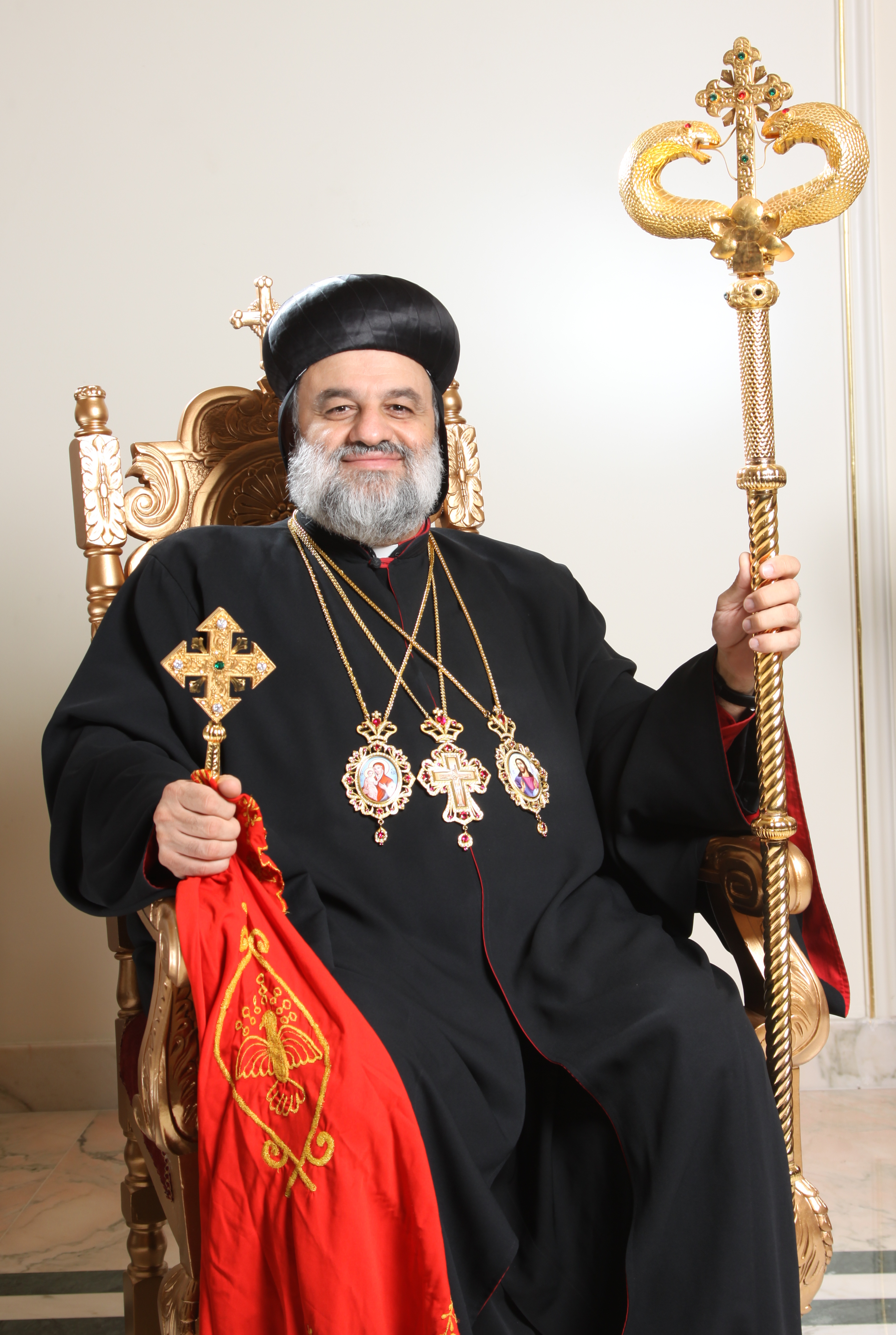
Ignatius Aphrem II, of the Syriac Orthodox Church (b.1965)

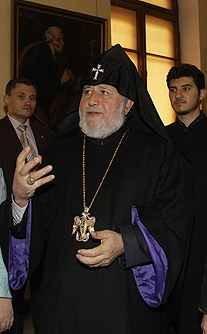
Armenian Apostolic Church Garegin II
(b. 1951)

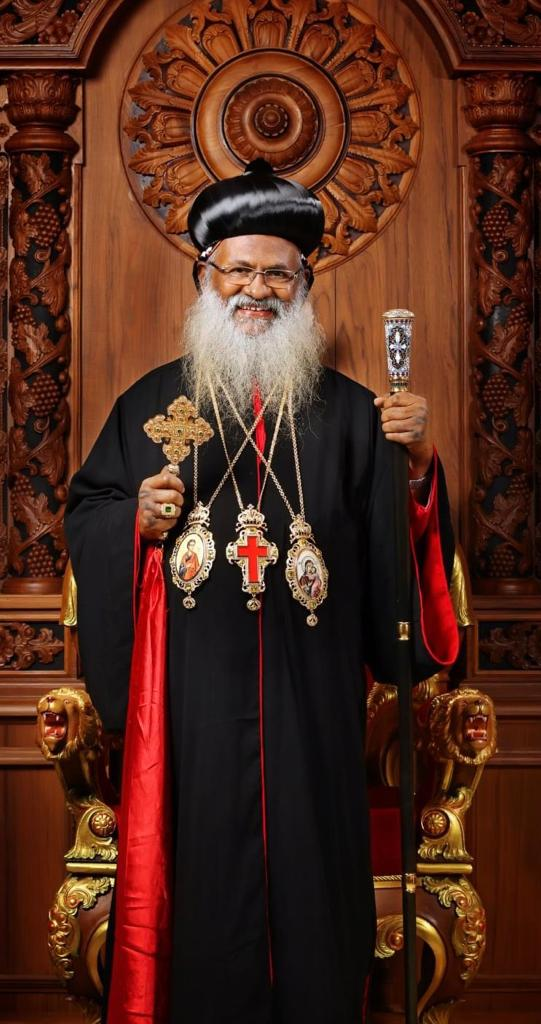
Baselios Marthoma Mathews III, of the Malankara Orthodox Syrian Church (b. 1949)

== Islam ==
It is only used in the Dawoodi Bohra sect of Ismaili Shia for the office of Da'i al-Mutlaq, Syedna. Syedna Mufaddal Saifuddin is recognized by most Dawoodi Bohras as the 53rd Da'i al-Mutlaq.

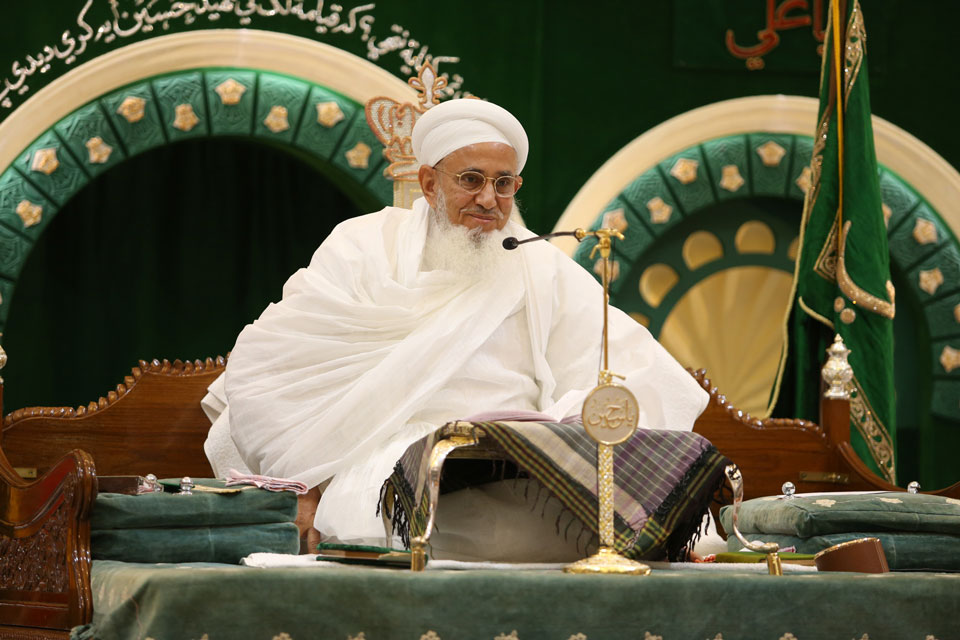
Syedna Mufaddal Saifuddin, 53rd Da'i al-Mutlaq

== Buddhism and Bon ==
The English-language honorific "His Holiness"(Burmese: အရှင်သူမြတ်ဘုရား; Ashin Thumyat Phya) and the female version "Her Holiness" have commonly and very recently been used for religious leaders from other traditions, including Buddhism leaders such as the Thanlyin Mingyaung Sayadaw, Ashin Nandamalabhivamsa, Sangharaja in Thailand, Dalai Lama, the Gyalwa Karmapa, the Je Khenpo in Bhutan, and Shinso Ito of the Shinnyo-en branch of Shingon Buddhism. In the Bön tradition it is used for the Menri Trizin.

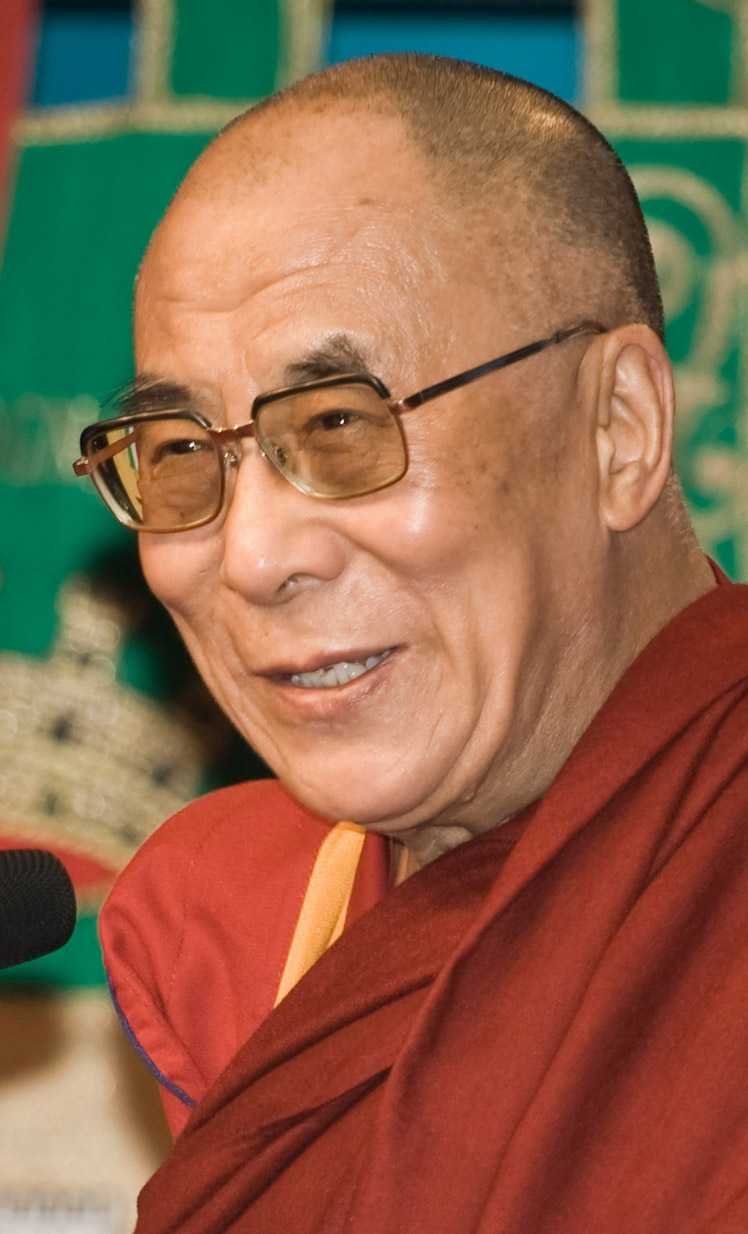
Dalai Lama, Tenzin Gyatso (b. 1935)

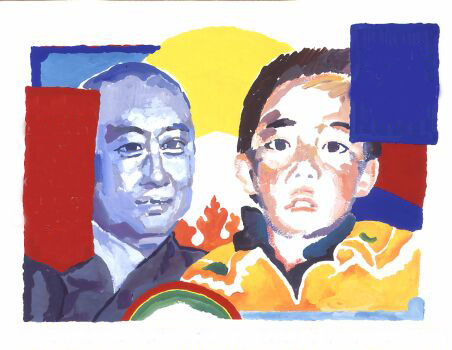
11° Panchen Lama, Gedhun Choekyi Nyima (b. 1989)

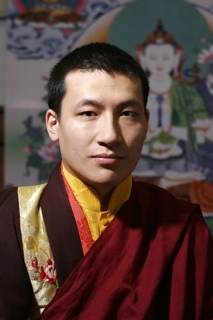
17° Karmapa, Trinley Thaye Dorje (b. 1983)

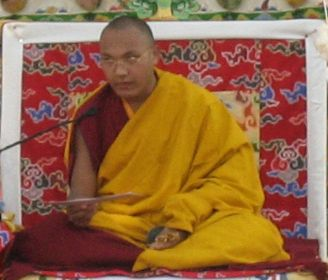
17° Karmapa, Ogyen Trinley Dorje (b. 1985)

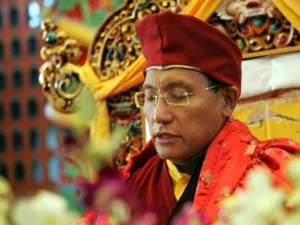
12° Gyalwang Drukpa, Jigme Pema Wangchen (b. 1963)

== See also ==
- Honorifics
- English honorifics
- Honorifics (linguistics)
- Papal titles

Catholic Church	Style
Pope	His Holiness
Cardinal	His Eminence
Bishop	His Excellency
