= Harir, Iraq =

Harir ھەریر
- Town
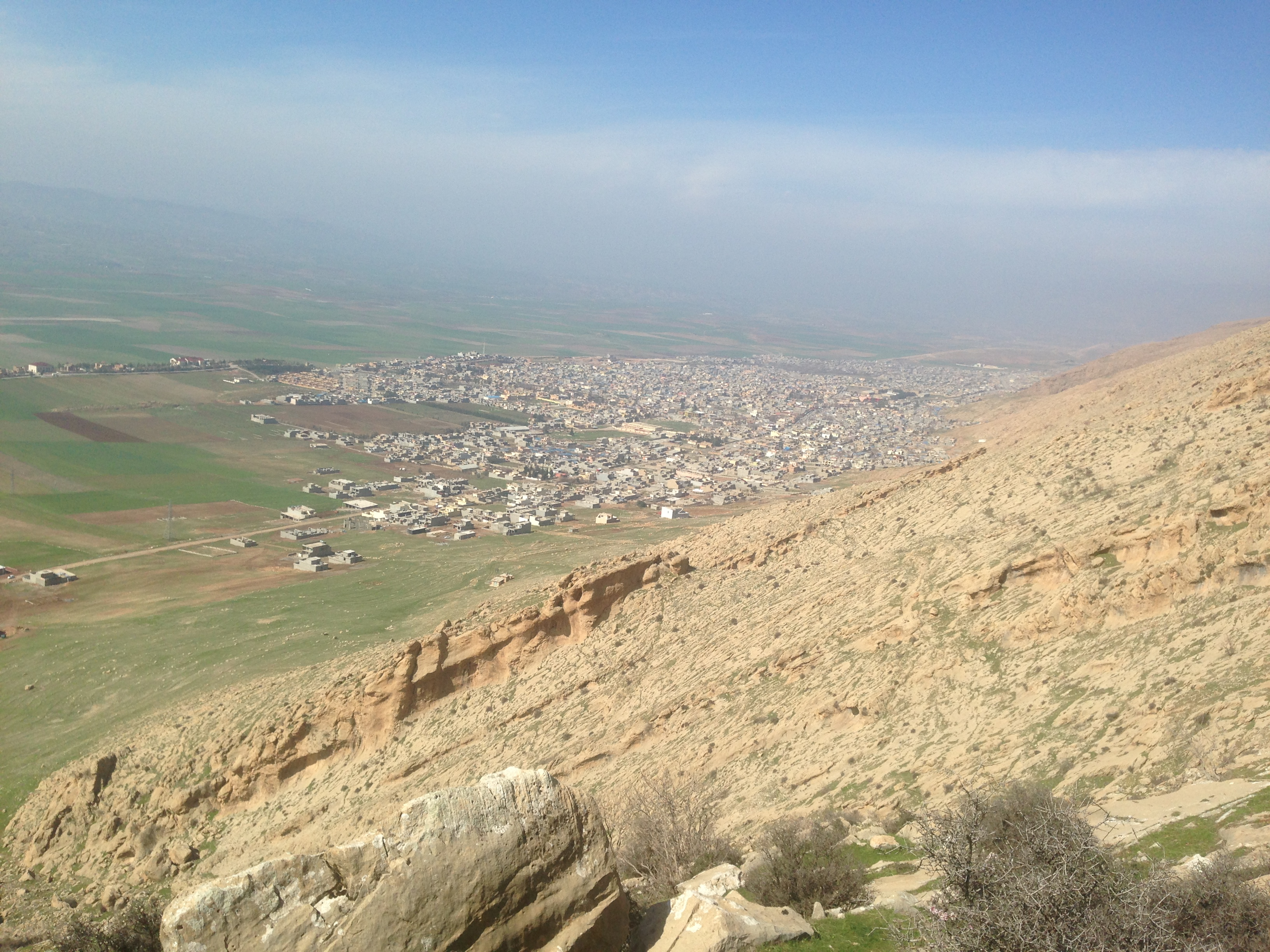

- Location in Iraq Harir (Iraqi Kurdistan)
- Coordinates: 36.5517°N 44.3516°E
- Country: Iraq
- Region: Kurdistan Region
- Governorate: Erbil Governorate
- District: Shaqlawa District
- Sub-district: Harir

Population (2014)
  - Urban: 28,518
  - Rural: 9,954

Harir (Kurdish: ھەریر, romanized: Herîr) is a town and sub-district in Erbil Governorate in Kurdistan Region, Iraq. The town is located in the Shaqlawa District.

The town is known for its proximity to the Harir Air Base.

In the town, there was a church of Mar Yohanna.

== History ==
According to the Yazidi tradition, the ruler (Mîr) of Harîr was Pîr Hesinmeman (Pir Hassan ibn Mam), who was one of the close companions of Sheikh Adi and is considered Pîr of forty Pîrs ('Pîrê çil Pîra') and head of the Pîr caste. Initially, upon hearing about Sheikh Adi's arrival, Pîr Hesinmeman declared a war on him with his 700 riders and decided to banish him. But when he came to Lalish and saw the dervish dressed in the garment, i.e. Sheikh Adi, he had a vision, after which he left worldly life and became a disciple of Sheikh Adi. The settlement of Salahaddin (Pirmam), where the residence of Masoud Barzani is situated, is believed to have been the ancestral estate of Pir Hassan ibn Mam.

Harir is mentioned by Evliya Çelebi in Seyahatnâme in the 17th century as part of Kurdistan. The district was ruled by Mir Xanzad of the Soran Emirate during the reign of the Ottoman Sultan Murad IV (r. 1623–1640). The town was rebuilt in 1928 by Assyrian refugees, all of whom were adherents of the Church of the East and were originally from Shemsdin in the Hakkari mountains in Turkey, after they had departed the refugee camp at Baqubah in the aftermath of the Assyrian genocide in the First World War. The church of Mar Yohanna was built soon after.

By 1938, Harir was inhabited by 485 Assyrians in 78 families. The town was destroyed and its population displaced by pro-government militia, who settled at Harir, in 1963 during the First Iraqi–Kurdish War, prior to which there were over 90 Assyrian households. The discovery of a mass grave, in which 37 Assyrians from Harir were buried, was announced by Kurdistan Regional Government's Minister of Human Rights on 18 February 2006.

A concentration camp was later established at Harir by the Iraqi government and used to intern over 300 Kurdish families of the Barzani tribe from the village of Argush who were forcibly deported there on 26 June 1978.

Amidst the 2003 invasion of Iraq, over one thousand paratroopers of the US 173rd Airborne Brigade landed at the airfield at Harir via airdrop on 26 March as part of Operation Northern Delay.

== Notable people ==
- Ali Hariri (1425–c. 1495), Kurdish poet
- Franso Hariri (1937–2001), Assyrian politician
- Fawzi Hariri (born 1958), Assyrian politician

== Bibliography ==
- Bengio, Ofra (2016). "Game Changers: Kurdish Women in Peace and War". The Middle East Journal. 70 (1): 30–46. doi:10.3751/70.1.12. JSTOR 43698618. S2CID 147356285.
- Donabed, Sargon George (2015). Reforging a Forgotten History: Iraq and the Assyrians in the Twentieth Century. Edinburgh University Press.
- Hamza, Ahmed Y. (2020). "A Contemporary Political History of the Kurds in Iran". In Mehmet Gurses; David Romano; Michael M. Gunter (eds.). The Kurds in the Middle East: Enduring Problems and New Dynamics. Lexington Books. pp. 207–228.
- Sadiq, Ibrahim (2021). Origins of the Kurdish Genocide: Nation Building and Genocide as a Civilizing and De-Civilizing Process. Lexington Books.
- Shareef, Mohammed (2014). The United States, Iraq and the Kurds: Shock, Awe and Aftermath. Routledge.
