= Eastern Orthodox Patriarch =

The term Eastern Orthodox Patriarch may refer to:

- any of nine canonical patriarchs of the Eastern Orthodox Church, such as:

- Ecumenical Patriarch of Constantinople
- Greek Orthodox Patriarch of Alexandria
- Greek Orthodox Patriarch of Antioch
- Greek Orthodox Patriarch of Jerusalem
- Russian Orthodox Patriarch
- Serbian Orthodox Patriarch
- Bulgarian Orthodox Patriarch
- Romanian Orthodox Patriarch
- Georgian Orthodox Patriarch

- any of several non-canonical patriarchs within the Eastern Orthodox tradition:

- primate of the Ukrainian Orthodox Church – Kyiv Patriarchate
- primate of the Ukrainian Autocephalous Orthodox Church Canonical
- primate of the Autocephalous Turkish Orthodox Patriarchate

== See also ==
- Oriental Orthodox Patriarch (disambiguation)
- Organization of the Eastern Orthodox Church
