= Harir Air Base =

Air base in Iraq

- Kurdish: بنکەی ئاسمانیی ھەریر (Bênkêy Asmānīy Harir)
- Harir, Erbil Governorate, Kurdistan Region, in Iraq

Site information
- Type: Special Operations Air Base
- Owner: Kurdistan Regional Government (de facto)
- Operator: United States Airforce (2003; ~2017–2026); Joint Special Operations Command (~2017–2026); Delta Force (~2017–2026)

Location
- Shown within Iraq
- Coordinates: 36°31′37″N 044°20′50″E

Site history
- Built: 1983
- In use: 1983–2003 (Iraqi Air Force); 2003–2026 (United States)
- Battles/wars: Iran–Iraq War; 2003 invasion of Iraq; War against the Islamic State; Attacks on US bases in Iraq during the Middle Eastern crisis (2023–present)
- Sources: DoD FLIP

Harir Air Base (ICAO: ORBR; Kurdish: بنکەی ئاسمانیی ھەریر), is a special operations air base located near to the town of Harir, in the Erbil Governorate, Kurdistan Region, Iraq.

== History ==
In 1983, the base, previously known as Bashur Airfield, was constructed to improve the deployment flexibility of the Iraqi Air Force. It was also as part of a national drive to construct new airfields and renovate existing airfields. It was in the early stages of construction by June 1983. A single 2,600 meter long runway orientated NW/SE was built, equipped with two taxiways and an apron.

The base was seized during Operation Northern Delay by the United States Armed Forces as part of the 2003 invasion of Iraq. During the operation to seize the base, American paratroopers of the 173rd Airborne Brigade reportedly believed they had landed in friendly territory after being greeted by local Kurds and encountering no resistance.

Soon after the invasion, the Kurdistan Regional Government (KRG) encouraged the United States to take advantage of the Kurdish region's stability and offered to host a long-term U.S. military presence at the Harir Air Base, but the proposal was declined. U.S. troops later withdrew entirely from Iraq and the base had been largerly abandoned.

In 2014, reports emerged of negotiations between the KRG and the U.S. over the possible use of the site to conduct airstrikes against the Islamic State. Iraqi Arab politicians reacted angrily to the reports. Majid al-Gharawi, a Baghdad lawmaker, said that “U.S. intentions to build a military base in the area of Harir are unacceptable,” adding that the move was aimed at reoccupying Iraq and exerting pressure on the central government for further concessions.

As part of Operation Inherent Resolve US military forces returned to the base in the war against the Islamic State. The base hosted various American aircraft and units, including special operation forces, such as:

- Pilatus U-28A Draco from the Air Force Special Operations Command
- Boeing MH-47G Chinook from the 160th Special Operations Aviation Regiment (Airborne) (160th SOAR (A))
- Sikorsky MH-60M Black Hawk from the 160th SOAR (A)
- General Atomics MQ-1C Gray Eagle of the United States Army

During the war against the Islamic State the base was also home to a unit of the Delta Force.

After the defeat of the Islamic State, the U.S. force at the base was gradually reduced, though a small contingent remained as of October 2025. On 30 September 2026, U.S. forces withdrew from the air base completely.
