= Oriental Orthodox Patriarch =

The term Oriental Orthodox Patriarch may refer to any of several patriarchs of the Oriental Orthodox Churches:

- Armenian Orthodox Patriarch
- Catholicos of the East and Malankara Metropolitan
- Coptic Orthodox Patriarch
- Ethiopian Orthodox Patriarch
- Eritrean Orthodox Patriarch
- Syriac Orthodox Patriarch (disambiguation)

== See also ==
- Eastern Orthodox Patriarch (disambiguation)
