= Shaqlawa District =

Shaqlawa District قەزای شەقڵاوە
- District
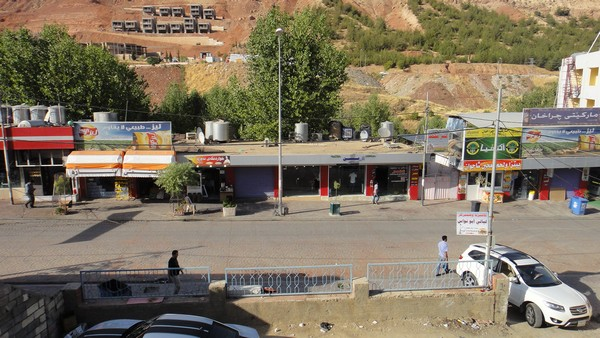
- View of the Main Street in Shaqlawa

- Location within Iraqi Kurdistan Location within Iraq
- Country: Iraq
- Autonomous region: Kurdistan
- Governorate: Erbil Governorate
- Seat: Shaqlawa
- Time zone: UTC+3 (AST)

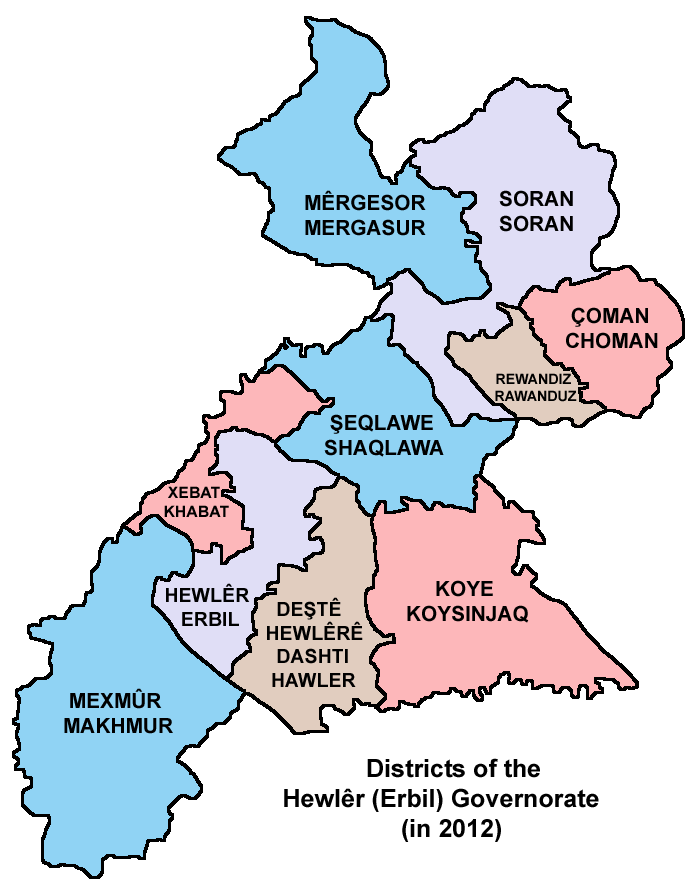
Districts of the Arbil Governorate (in 2012) according to Kurdistan Region Statistics Office web site.

Shaqlawa District (Kurdish: قەزای شەقڵاوە, romanized: Qezay Şeqlawe, Arabic: قضاء شقلاوة) is a district in the Erbil Governorate, Iraq. This district encompasses three sub-districts Hiran, Salahaddin and Harir, and 210 villages. It lies 50 km from the city of Erbil.
