= Aprim Khamis =

His Grace Mar Aprim Khamis
- Bishop Emeritus of Western United States
- Church: Assyrian Church of the East ܥܕܬܐ ܕܡܕܢܚܐ ܕܐܬܘܖ̈ܝܐ
- Diocese: Western United States

Orders
- Rank: Bishop

Personal details
- Born: January 7, 1943 (age 83)
- Denomination: Assyrian Church of the East
- Residence: Phoenix, United States
- Occupation: Cleric

Mar Aprim Khamis is the Assyrian Church of the East Bishop of the Western United States. Mar Aprim Khamis was ordained as a Bishop (along with Mar Daniel Yakob) on 2 March 1973 as Bishop for Basra. He left the diocese in the same year and transferred to become Bishop of the United States and Canada. Since 1994, Mar Aprim has been serving as Bishop for the Diocese of Western United States, with his See in Phoenix, Arizona.

== Diocese of Western United States ==
=== Parishes ===
- Mar Patros (St. Peter) Cathedral - Glendale, Arizona
- Mart Mariam (St. Mary) Parish - Tarzana, California
- Mar Yosip (Yosip Khnanisho) Parish - Gilbert, Arizona
- Mar Benyamin Shimun Parish - Las Vegas, Nevada
- Mar Gewargis Mission - New Hall, California
- Mar Paulus (St. Paul) Parish - Anaheim, California
- Mar Rabban Hormizd Parish - Spring Valley, California
- Mar Yacoub Mission - Carrolton, Texas

== See also ==
- Assyrian Church of the East
- Assyrian Church of the East's Holy Synod
