= Dinkha IV =

20th and 21st-century Patriarch of the Church of the East

Mar Dinkha IV ܡܪܝ ܕܢܚܐ ܪܒܝܥܝܐ
- His Holiness
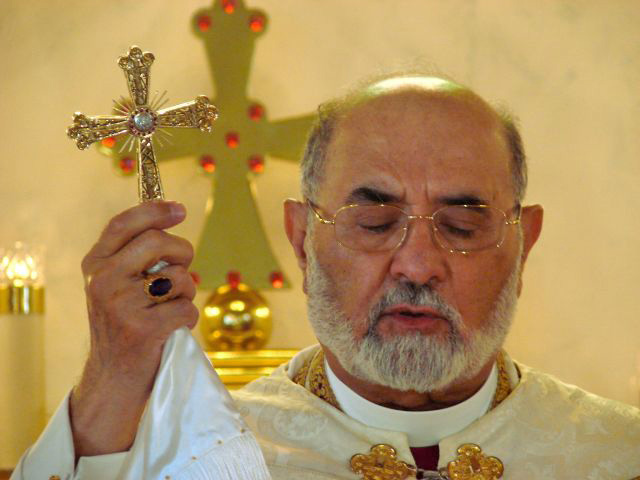
- Dinkha IV presiding at the Assyrian Eucharist (or Raza) in a church near Chicago in June 2008.
- Church: Assyrian Church of the East
- Diocese: Patriarchal Diocese of the Eastern United States
- See: Holy Apostolic See of Seleucia-Ctesiphon (in exile in Chicago)
- Installed: 17 October 1976
- Term ended: 26 March 2015
- Predecessor: Mar Shimun XXI Eshai
- Successor: Mar Gewargis III
- Other posts: Deaconate at Mar Yokhanan Church, Harir (1950), Bishopric at Urmia (11 February 1962)

Orders
- Ordination: 15 August 1957
- Consecration: 11 February 1962 by Shimun XXI Eshai
- Rank: Bishop

Personal details
- Born: Dinkha Khananya (Khanania); 15 September 1935 Darbandokeh, Iraq
- Died: 26 March 2015 (aged 79) Rochester, Minnesota, U.S.
- Buried: Montrose Cemetery in Chicago, Illinois, U.S.
- Denomination: Assyrian Church of the East
- Residence: Chicago, Illinois, U.S.
- Parents: Andrews Khananya (father) and Panna Khananya (mother)
- Occupation: Cleric

Mar Dinkha IV (Classical Syriac: ܡܪܝ ܕܢܚܐ ܪܒܝܥܝܐ and Arabic: مار دنخا الرابع), born Dinkha Khanania (15 September 1935 – 26 March 2015) was an Eastern Christian prelate who served as the Catholicos-Patriarch of the Assyrian Church of the East. He was born in the village of Darbandokeh (Derbendoki), Iraq, and led the Church in exile in Chicago for most of his life. He was the first patriarch not from the Shimun family since establishment of the Assyrian Church of the East in 1672, and the first following the abolition of hereditary succession.

== Personal life ==
Dinkha Khanania was born in Iraq and baptized in the Church of Mar Qaryaqos located in the village of his birth, Darbandokeh. Khanania (also written as "Denkha Kh'nanya") gained his elementary education under the tutorship of his grandfather, Benyamin Soro. In 1947—at the age of eleven—he was entrusted to the care of Mar Yousip Khnanisho, Metropolitan and the Patriarchal representative for all Iraq, the second-highest-ranking ecclesiastic of the Assyrian Church of the East. After two years of study, he was ordained deacon in the church of Mar Youkhana in Harir by Mar Yousip on 12 September 1949. On 15 July 1957, he was ordained to the priesthood, and appointed to minister Urmia, Iran. He was the fourth in the line of succession to the Bishopric of Urmia.

Mar Dinkha's priesthood as Metropolitan of Iran and Tehran reestablished a line of succession which had ceased to exist after the 1915 assassination of his predecessor. In 1962, Mar Dinkha moved from northern Iraq to Tehran. During his tenure in Iran, he established a seminary and advocated for Assyrian nationalism and ecumenism. Responding to popular demand, Catholicos-Patriarch Shimun XXI Eshai consecrated Mar Dinkha as bishop on 11 February 1962, in the church of Martyr Mar Gewargis in Tehran.

Mar Dinkha died on 26 March 2015 at the Mayo Clinic in Rochester, Minnesota. The cause of death was virus infection and pneumonia.

== Tenure as Catholicos-Patriarch ==
After the assassination of Mar Shimun XXI Eshai, the Church of the East had an urgent need to restore its leadership. In 1976, the prelates of the church convened in London to elect a new Catholicos Patriarch and chose Mar Dinkha as the most qualified candidate to fill the post. He was consecrated on 17 October 1976, in the West London Church of St. Barnabas, Ealing. With this consecration, Mar Dinkha IV became the successor to the Apostolic see of Seleucia-Ctesiphon (Babylon). He also announced that the hereditary line of succession for the Patriarchy which had existed for 500 years was discontinued with his tenure, allowing any cleric from the Church of the East to be elevated to Catholicos-Patriarch.

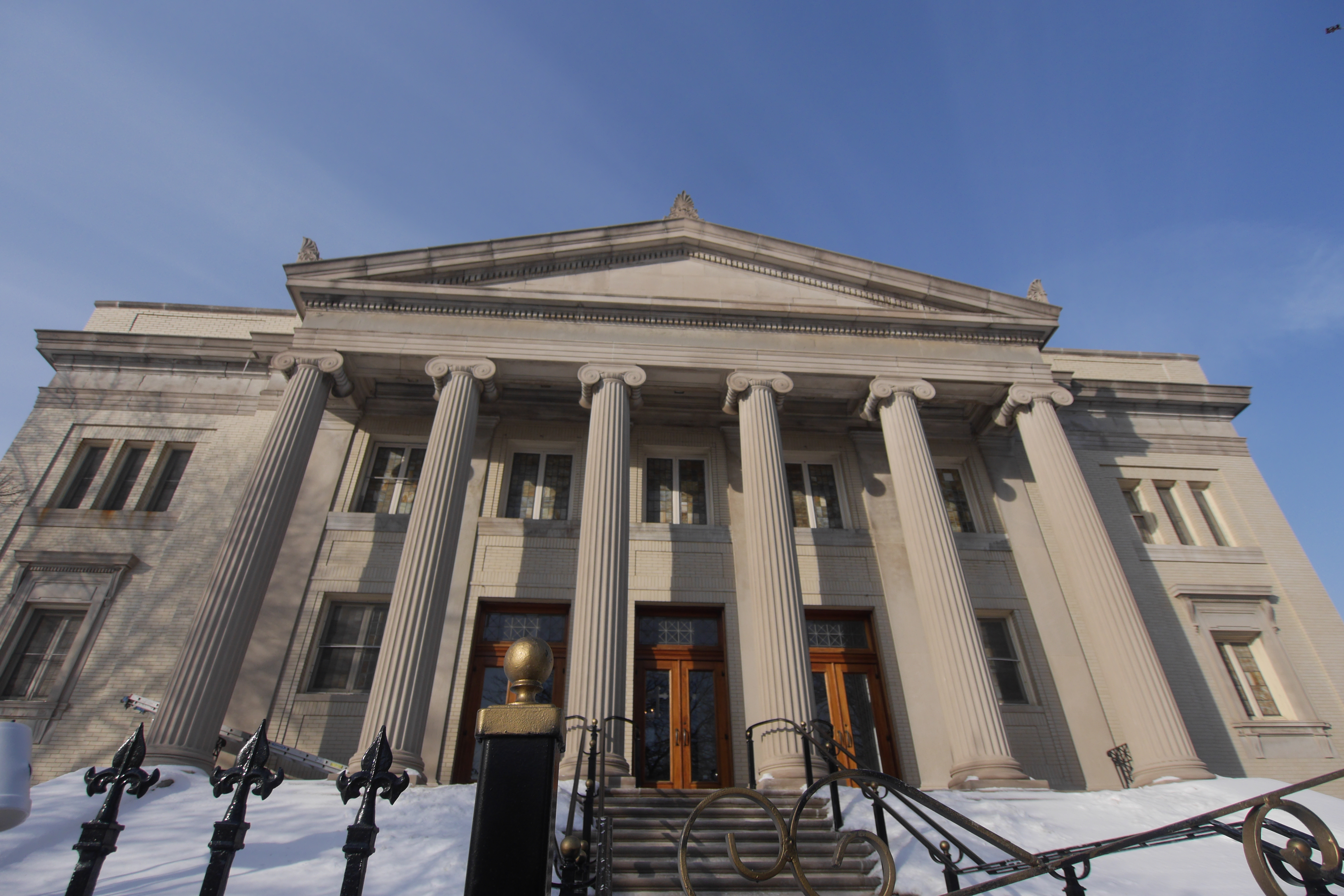
Holy Apostolic Catholic Assyrian Church Of The East-St. George Cathedral, 7201 N. Ashland Ave Chicago, Illinois, U.S.

Dinkha established headquarters—along with four other houses of worship—in Chicago, Illinois, United States, in part due to the instability of the Iran–Iraq War. This conflict as well as Saddam Hussein's policy of Arabization in Iraq, the Gulf War and subsequent sanctions against Iraq intensified the Assyrian diaspora from the region. Meanwhile, the Islamic Revolution and Shia emphasis in Iran created a tense situation for Assyrians in the Middle East. During the reign of Shimun XXI and Dinkha IV, American membership in the Assyrian Church of the East rose from 3,200 in the 1950s to approximately 100,000 in 2008.

In 2005, the Patriarch conducted discussions with President of Iraqi Kurdistan Masoud Barzani on returning to the Apostolic See in northern Iraq and constructing a new residence in Ankawa. On 15 July 2007, Mar Dinkha celebrated 50 years of his priesthood. A ceremony was held at St. George Cathedral in Chicago, where a portion of Ashland Avenue was renamed "His Holiness Mar Dinkha IV Blvd". In 2008, he received an honorary degree from the University of Chicago, in part because of his emphasis on education—he stated a goal of only appointing theologians with doctoral degrees to the position of bishop.

== Travels and ecumenism ==
Dinkha made ecumenism a priority during his reign, as well as advocacy for the Assyrian people.

=== Relations with the Catholic Church ===
Dinkha promoted closer relations with the Catholic Church, both with the Vatican and the Chaldean Catholic Church; he first met Pope John Paul II immediately after the Pope's election in 1978 and made his first visit to the Vatican in 1984. The two continued to meet informally over the next decade. After a decision by the Holy Synod of the Assyrian Church of the East to have better relations with the Roman Catholic Church in 1994, Dinkha agreed to a Joint Christological Declaration with the Holy See. The "Common Christological Declaration Between the Catholic Church and the Assyrian Church of the East" declares that it is "[a] basic step on the way towards the full communion to be restored between their Churches;" emphasized common doctrinal positions between the two bodies, such as the Nicene Creed; and clarifies that the centuries the two have spent out of communion were due to geographic and cultural issues rather than doctrinal differences.

On 29 November 1996, Dinkha signed an agreement of cooperation with the Patriarch of Babylon of the Chaldean Catholic Church—Raphael I Bidawid—in Southfield, Michigan and met again on 16 August 1997, to bless an Assyrian church. This "Joint Synodal Decree for Promoting Unity" also established a Joint Commission for Unity which helped draft the 2001 "Guidelines for Admission to the Eucharist between the Chaldean Church and the Assyrian Church of the East" that allows Assyrians and Chaldeans to accept the Eucharist from one another. The prior year, Assyrians and Roman Catholics also produced "A Common Statement on Sacramental Life" that assessed the importance of sacraments in both churches. Assyrians have also been allowed to study at Baghdad's Chaldean Catholic College and unmarried deacons and priests can study at Catholic universities in Rome.

=== Middle Eastern and Syriac ecumenism ===
The Church of the East has been a member of the World Council of Churches since its 1948 inception and Dinkha used this membership as a vehicle for bi- and multi-lateral ecumenism that would have been impossible prior to its inception. In 1984, the Assyrian Church applied for membership in the Middle East Council of Churches (MECC), but was denied due to objections by the Coptic Orthodox Church of Alexandria, whose Patriarch, Pope Shenouda III, required the Church of the East to condemn its Church Fathers Diodore of Tarsus, Nestorius, and Theodore of Mopsuestia. The dispute between the Assyrians and Copts resulted in a common Christological declaration in 1996, which was later rejected by the Coptic synod. In 1996, the Church of the East was offered membership in the MECC, but declined to join at the time. Discussions for the Church of the East to join the MECC have stalled since 1999.

The Austrian Pro Oriente Foundation brought together several Syriac churches in Vienna in 1994 to start a common dialogue amongst the Ancient Church of the East, the Assyrian Church of the East, Chaldean Catholic Church, Indian (Malankara) Orthodox Church, Maronite Church, Syriac Catholic Church, Syriac Orthodox Church, Syro-Malabar Catholic Church, and Syro-Malankara Catholic Church. Representatives of these churches along with academics founded the Commission on Dialogue Within the Syriac Tradition. Consultations have been convened intermittently since that time. As a product of this process, Dinkha entered into negotiations with the Syriac Orthodox Patriarch Mar Ignatius Zakka I Iwas in 1997 and the two churches ceased anathematizing each other. Although Dinkha spent over 20 years in dialogue with the Ancient Church of the East, the two remain out of communion. In 1995, the Indian metropolitan see pledged its allegiance to Dinkha, leaving the Ancient Church primarily active in the Middle East, with some 50,000–70,000 members. In 1999, Dinkha declared that all ordinations and orders from the Ancient Church were valid.

=== Political work and Assyrian advocacy ===
In September 2006, Mar Dinkha IV paid a historic visit to northern Iraq to give oversight to the churches there and to encourage the president of Iraqi Kurdistan to open a Christian school in Erbil. During this trip, he also met Iraqi President Jalal Talabani and Prime Minister Nouri al-Maliki. Dinkha pursued a pragmatic political course, calling on Assyrians to work together with their respective governments. He sought to de-politicize the office of Catholicos-Patriarch and expanded the church's outreach to the youth by including non-Syriac liturgies composed in local languages.

== See also ==
- List of patriarchs of the Church of the East

== Sources ==
- Baum, Wilhelm; Winkler, Dietmar W. (2003). The Church of the East: A Concise History. London-New York: Routledge-Curzon. ISBN 9781134430192.
- Baumer, Christoph (2006). The Church of the East: An Illustrated History of Assyrian Christianity. London-New York: Tauris. ISBN 9781845111151.
- Bailey, J. Martin (2003), Who Are the Christians in the Middle East? (Paperback), Wm. B. Eerdmans Publishing, ISBN 0-8028-1020-9
- Coakley, James F. (1996). "The Church of the East since 1914". The Bulletin of the John Rylands Library. 78 (3): 179–198. doi:10.7227/BJRL.78.3.14.
- Joseph, John (2000), The Modern Assyrians of the Middle East: Encounters with Western Christian Missions, Archaeologists, and Colonial Powers (Hardback), Studies in Christian Mission, vol. 26 (2nd ed.), Brill Publishers, ISBN 90-04-11641-9
- O’Mahony, Anthony (2006). "Syriac Christianity in the modern Middle East". In Angold, Michael (ed.). The Cambridge History of Christianity: Eastern Christianity. Vol. 5. Cambridge: Cambridge University Press. pp. 511–536. ISBN 9780521811132.
- Mooken, Aprem (2003). The History of the Assyrian Church of the East in the Twentieth Century. Kottayam: St. Ephrem Ecumenical Research Institute.

Assyrian Church of the East titles
| Preceded by Mar Shimun XXI Eshai | Catholicos-Patriarch of the Assyrian Church of the East; 1976–2015 | Succeeded by Mar Gewargis III |
