= Alejandro Avruj =

Argentine Conservative rabbi

The Rab. Alejandro Avruj is Rabbi of the Comunidad Amijai, and Vice President of the Latin American Rabbinical Assembly of the Masorti Movement.

He completed his rabbinical studies at the “Abraham J. Heschel” Higher Institute of Rabbinical Studies in Buenos Aires and at the Schechter Institute of Jewish Studies in Jerusalem. Master in Rabbinical Literature and Jewish Education at the Schechter Institute of Jewish Studies, having completed studies for the MA in Rabbinical Literature at the Jewish Theological Seminary of America in New York in 2001, and for the MA in Jewish Education at the Hebrew University of Jerusalem in 2002.

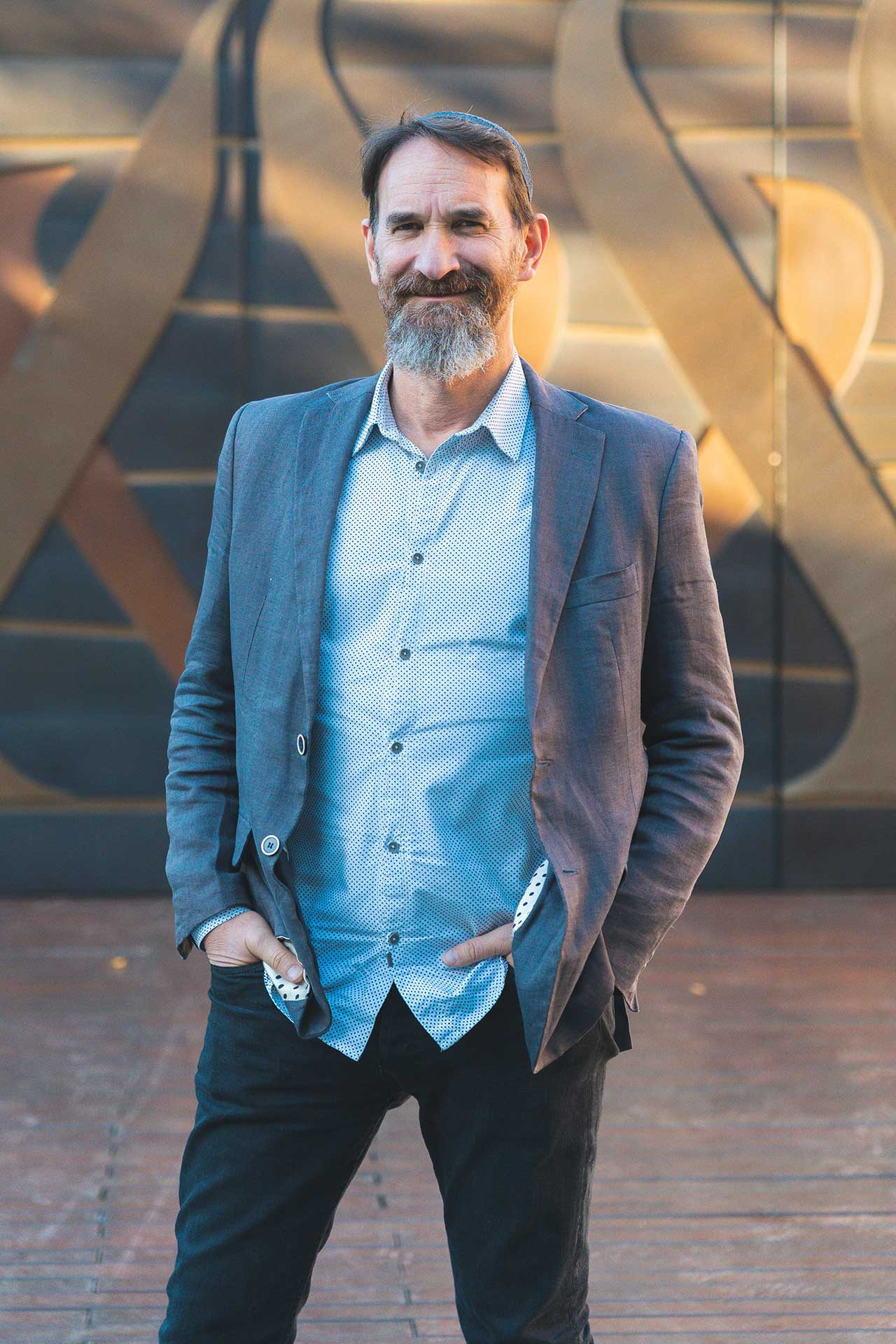
Alejandro Avruj, Rabino de la Comunidad Amijai.

He was Honored with the distinction of the Human Rights Award by the B'nei Brith Argentina, for his social work in Villas de Emergency, in 2014 and with the “Men of Buenos Aires” award together with Padre Pepe by the Fundación Banco Provincia de Buenos Aires.

Alejandro Avruj is an Argentine Conservative rabbi. He is currently the Rabbi of Comunidad Amijai. He was the president of NCI-Emanu El, a Jewish community established in 1943 by Jews that escaped from the Holocaust. He resigned in 2013, after 11 years to begin new projects in another community.
