= Operation Northern Delay =

2003 American military operation in Iraq

- Part of the 2003 invasion of Iraq
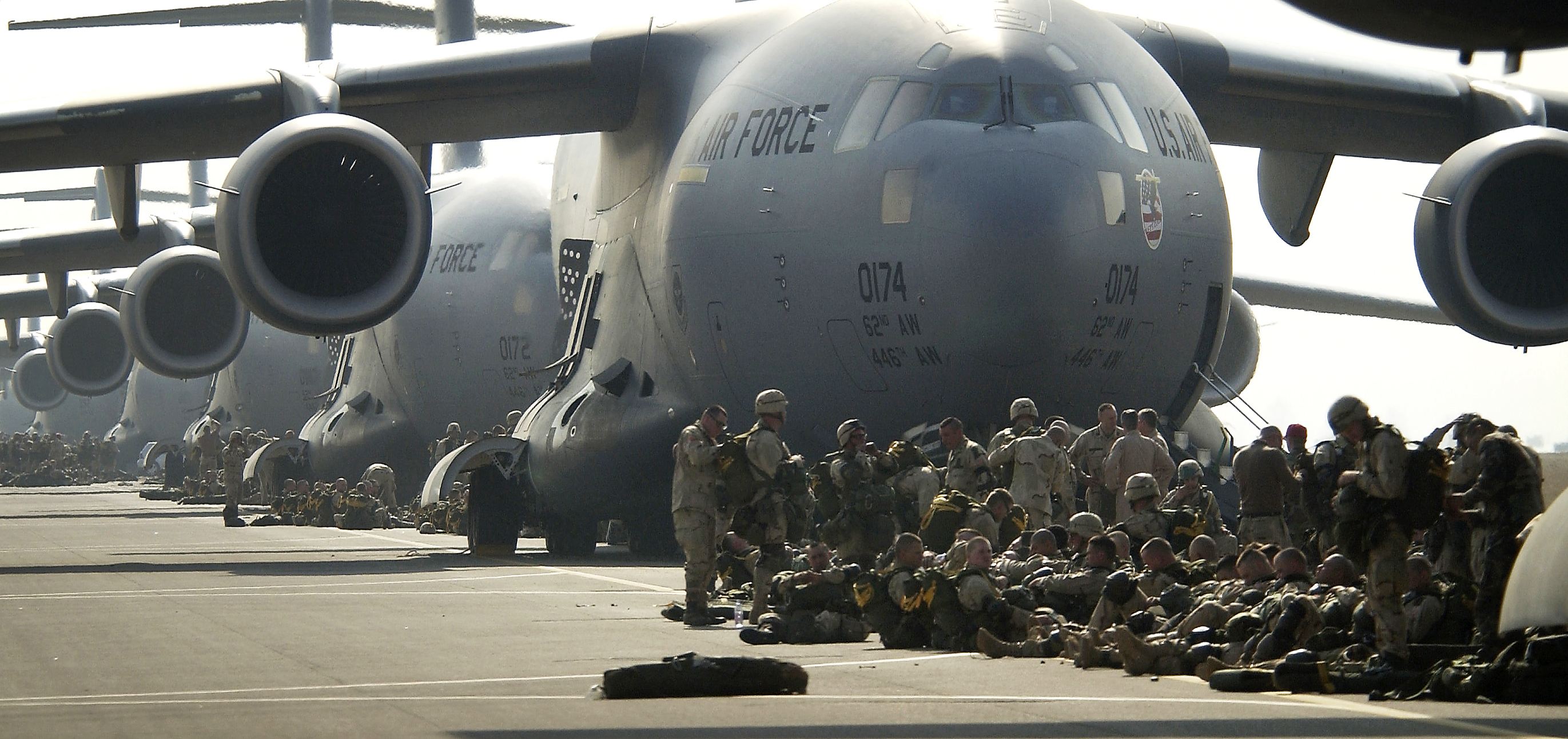
- U.S. Army paratroopers preparing to board a C-17 Globemaster III to jump into Northern Iraq
Date	26 March 2003
Location	Harir Air Base, Erbil Governorate, Iraq 36.5331°N 44.3404°E
Result	U.S. victory

Belligerents
United States; United Kingdom	Ba'athist Iraq

Units involved
173rd Airborne Brigade	Iraqi Army (Unknown)

Strength
1,000+ U.S. troops, <40 UK troops	Unknown
- The operation involved dropping over 950 paratroopers from the 173rd Airborne Brigade into the Harir Air Base in Northern Iraq. The operation helped to relieve pressure on Coalition forces advancing toward Baghdad from the south. It was the last large-scale combat parachute operation conducted by the U.S. military since Operation Just Cause.
- Location of Bashur Airfield in Iraq

Operation Northern Delay occurred on 26 March 2003 as part of the 2003 U.S. invasion of Iraq. It involved dropping paratroopers into Northern Iraq. It was the last large-scale combat parachute operation conducted by the U.S. military since Operation Just Cause.

== Background ==
On 26 March 2003, during the American invasion of Iraq, C-17s of the 62d Airlift Wing, 315th Airlift Wing, 437th Airlift Wing, and 446th Airlift Wing dropped SETAF's 173rd Airborne Brigade into Northern Iraq. 996 paratroopers jumped into the Bashur drop zone.

The operation forced the Iraqi Army to maintain approximately six divisions in the area to protect its northern flank, providing strategic relief for Coalition Forces advancing on Baghdad from the south. Bashur Airfield is located in northern Iraq approximately 356 kilometers north of Baghdad, 50 kilometers northeast of Erbil. The airbase is served by a single 6,700-foot long runway. Bashur appeared to be a small civilian airport.

Bashur is the epitome of a bare base. It was nothing more than a 7,000-foot runway in the middle of a green valley. It had no infrastructure – no water or sewage system, no electricity, buildings, or paved roads.

== Operation ==
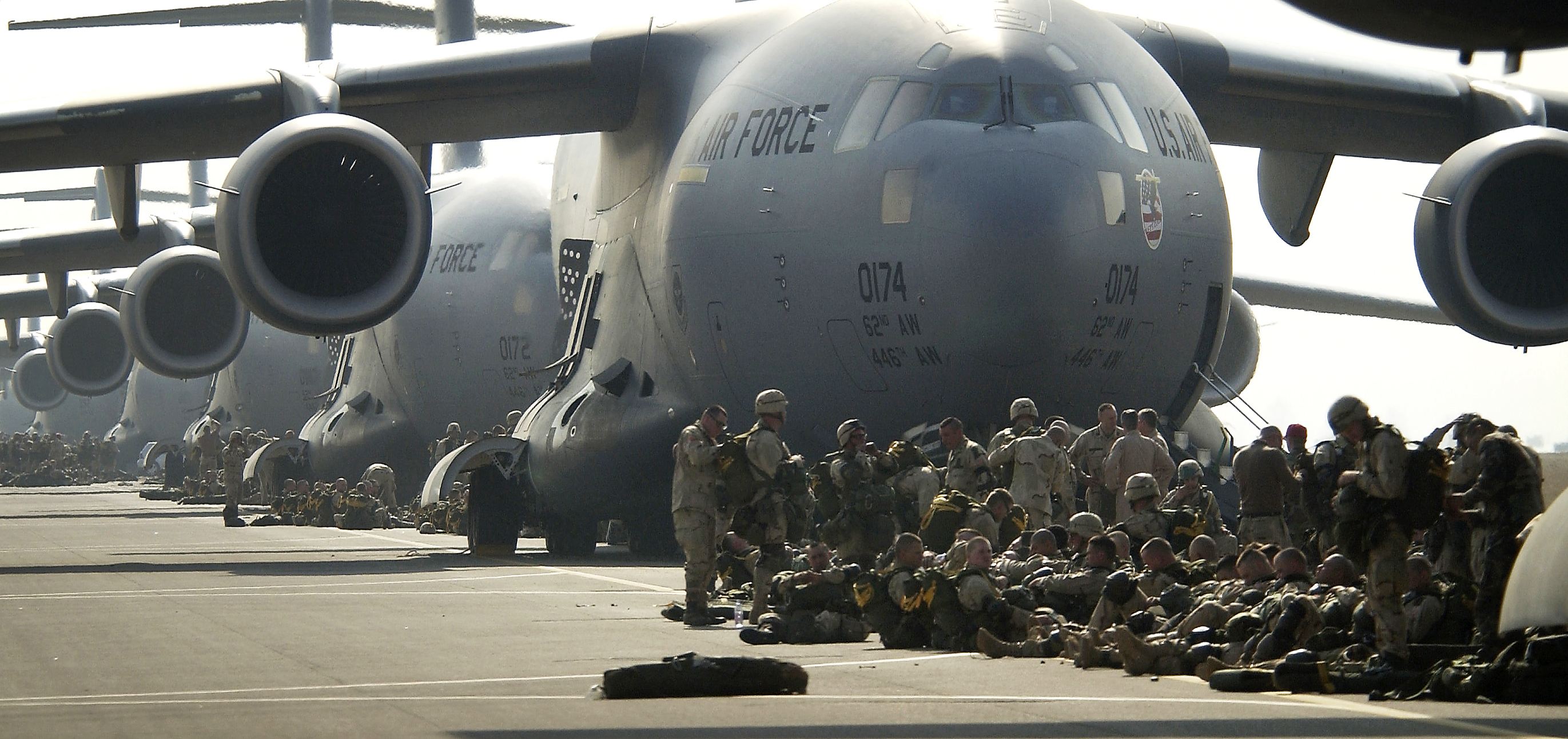
U.S. Army paratroopers prepare to board a C-17 Globemaster III into the Kurdish-controlled area of northern Iraq. This was the first combat insertion of paratroopers using a C-17.

On 26 March 2003, more than 950 paratroopers from the 173d Airborne Brigade commanded by Col. Bill Mayville consisting of 1-508 (ABN) Infantry commanded by Lt. Col. Harry Tunnell and 2-503 (ABN) Infantry commanded by Lt. Col. Dominic Caraccilo jumped into Bashur, Iraq, to set the stage for a northern front. Two days later, the first soldier from the 501st Forward Support Company, 173d Airborne Brigade, Supply Support Activity (SSA) arrived at Bashur Airfield. The operation was classified as a combat jump by the Army, although the landing zone was secured by Kurdish and American forces, which is not typical of combat jumps. During the next two weeks at Bashur Airfield, all supplies arrived via the airlines of communication (ALOC) on C-17s and C-130s from Ramstein Air Base, Germany through Aviano AB, Italy. During an average 24-hour day of operations, more than 40 Air Force 463L master pallet would arrive. Each pallet then had to be downloaded from the plane, transported to the SSA, processed and finally issued either to storage or to customers.

Some of the C-17s carried M1A1 Abrams tanks and weighed from 250,000 to 300,000 pounds when they landed. After two weeks of use by heavy cargo planes, parts of Bashur's 7,000-foot runway crumbled, forcing the closure of 2,300 feet.

== Aftermath ==
As of April 2003, Delta Battery 319th Airborne Field Artillery Regiment remained in Bashur, and continued training the New Iraqi Army on key tasks which would be needed in to complete future operations in the region. Delta Battery also provided indirect fire support for coalition forces in the area when coalition forces came into contact with insurgents.

A 20 April 2003 report in the New York Times asserted that "the U.S. is planning a long-term military relationship with the emerging government of Iraq, one that would grant the Pentagon access to military bases and project American influence into the heart of the unsettled region." The report, citing anonymous sources, referred to one base at Baghdad's international airport, another near Al-Nasiriyah in the south [presumably meaning Tallil AB], the third at the H-1 airstrip in the western desert, and the fourth at Bashur AB in the north.

Bashur Airbase is now known as Al-Harir Air Base/Harir Airport.

== See also ==
- Task Force Viking – 'Joint Special Operations Task Force - North'
- 173rd Airborne Brigade Combat Team
