= Khazim =

Khazim is a name of Arabic origin.

== List of people with the given name ==
- Khazim ibn Khuzayma al-Tamimi

== List of people with the surname ==
- Abd Allah ibn Khazim al-Sulami
- Abdallah ibn Khazim al-Tamimi
- Khuzayma ibn Khazim
- Shu'ayb ibn Khazim
- Zouhair Khazim

== See also ==
- Kazeem (disambiguation)
