= Al-Mada'in =

Ancient city in modern Iraq near Ctesiphon and Seleucia

Coordinates: 33°06′N 44°35′E

Location within modern-day Iraq

Al-Mada'in (Arabic: المدائن, al-Madāʾin; Jewish Babylonian Aramaic: מחוזא Māḥozā; lit. 'the cities') was an ancient metropolis situated on the Tigris in what is now Iraq. It was located between the ancient royal centers of Ctesiphon and Seleucia, and was founded by the Sasanian Empire. The city's name was used by Arabs as a synonym for the Sasanian capital of Ctesiphon, in a tradition that continued after the Arab conquest of Iran.

== Foundation and constitution ==
According to myth, al-Mada'in was constructed by the legendary Iranian kings Tahmuras or Hushang, who named it Kardbandad. The city was then later rebuilt by the legendary Iranian king Zab, the Macedonian king Alexander the Great (r. 356–323 BCE) and the Sasanian emperor Shapur II (r. 309–379 CE). According to another folklore, the names of five (or seven) cities that al-Mada'in comprised were Aspanbur, Veh-Ardashir, Hanbu Shapur, Darzanidan, Veh Jondiu-Khosrow, Nawinabad and Kardakadh.

== Sasanian period ==
Map of Ctesiphon

According to Perso-Arabic sources, Ctesiphon, the capital of the Sasanian Empire, was greatly enlarged and flourished during their rule, thus turning into a metropolis, which was known in Arabic as al-Mada'in, and in Aramaic as Mahoza. The oldest inhabited places of al-Mada'in were on its eastern side, which in Arabic sources is called "the Old City", where the residence of the Sasanians, known as the White Palace, was located. The southern side of al-Mada'in was known as Aspanbar, which was known by its prominent halls, riches, games, stables, and baths.

The western side was known as Veh-Ardashir (meaning "the good city of Ardashir" in Middle Persian), known as Mahoza by the Jews, Kokhe by the Christians, and Behrasir by the Arabs. Veh-Ardashir was populated by many wealthy Jews, and was the seat of the Church of the East patriarch. To the south of Veh-Ardashir was Valashabad.

In 495, during the turbulent reign of Emperor Kavad I, Mahoza (as the Jews called the city) was the scene of a Jewish revolt led by Exilarch Mar-Zutra II. After the king denied Jews the right to organize their own militia, Mar-Zutra took advantage of the confusion into which Mazdak's communistic attempts had plunged Persia and led a successful military revolt that achieved political independence for the Jews of Mahoza. The Jewish state lasted seven years until 502 CE, when Kavad finally defeated Mar-Zutra and punished him with crucifixion on the bridge of Mahoza.

In 540, Khosrow I (r. 531–579) resettled captives from Antioch to the south of Aspanbur, a place which became known as Weh Antiok Khosrow, a Middle Persian name meaning "better than Antioch, Khosrow built this". It was known by the locals of the place as Rumagan ("town of the Romans"), while the Arabs knew it as al-Rumiya (also spelled Rumiya).

In 590, a member of the House of Mihran, Bahram Chobin repelled the newly ascended Sasanian ruler Khosrow II from Iraq, and conquered the region. One year later, Khosrau II, with aid from the Byzantine Empire, reconquered his domains. During his reign, some of the great fame of al-Mada'in decreased, due to the popularity of Khosrau's new winter residence, Dastagerd. In 628, a deadly plague hit al-Mada'in and the rest of the western part of the Sasanian Empire, which even killed Khosrau's son and successor, Kavadh II.

In 629, al-Mada'in was briefly under the control of Mihranid usurper Shahrbaraz, but the latter was shortly assassinated by the supporters of Khosrau II's daughter, the banbishn Boran. Al-Mada'in then continued to be involved in constant fighting between two factions of the Sasanian Empire, the Pahlav (Parthian) faction under the House of Ispahbudhan and the Parsig (Persian) faction under Piruz Khosrow.

== Rashidun and Umayyad period ==
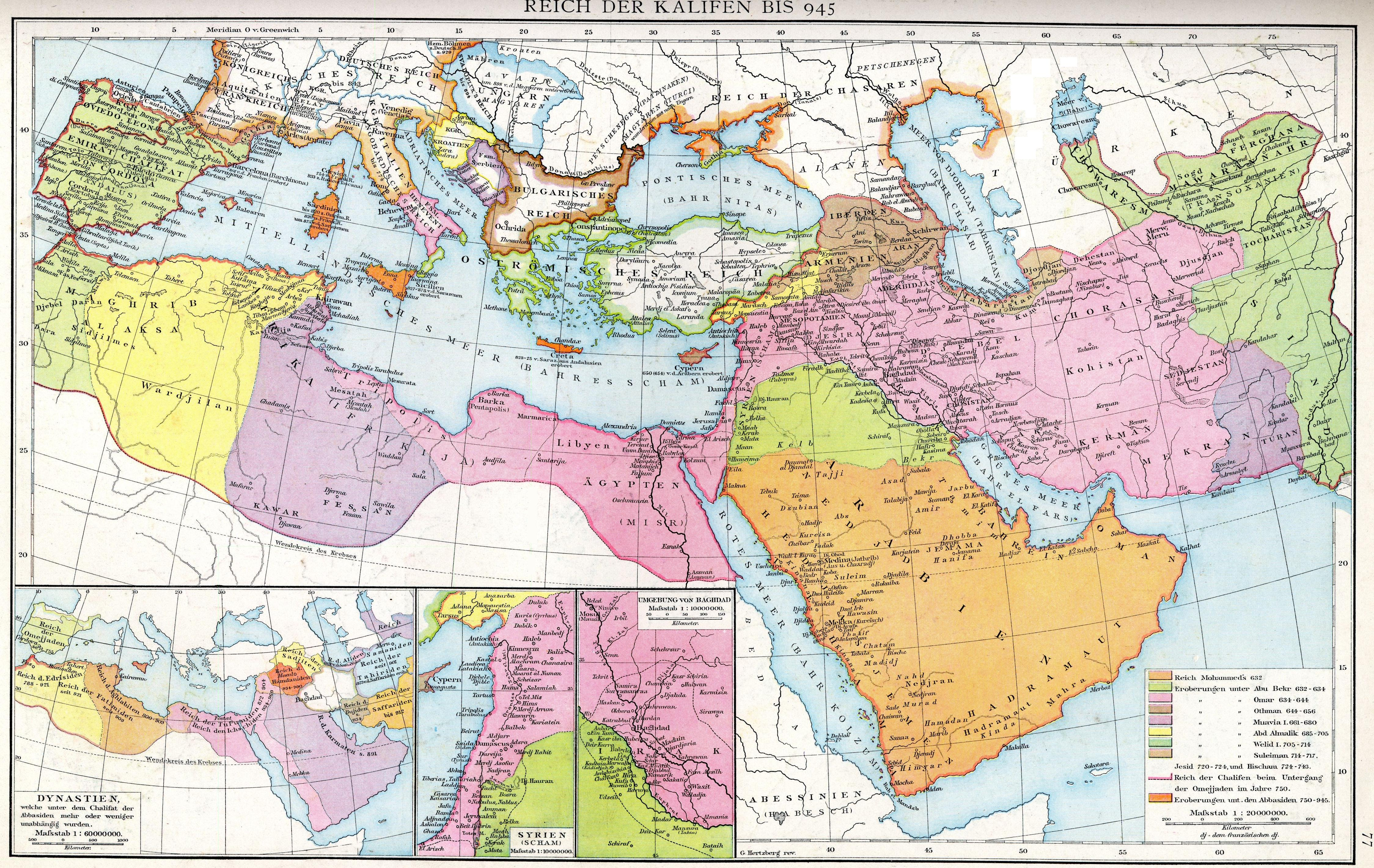
Map of the Muslim expansion and the Muslim world under the Umayyad and early Abbasid caliphates

In 636, the Muslim Arabs, who had since 633 invaded the territories of the Sasanian Empire, defeated them during a great battle known as the Battle of al-Qādisiyyah. The Arabs then attacked Ctesiphon, and seized some parts of al-Mada'in.

The Muslim military officer Khalid ibn 'Urfuta quickly seized Valashabad and made a peace treaty with the inhabitants of Rumiya and Behrasir. Terms of the treaty were that the inhabitants of Rumiya were allowed to leave if they wanted to, but if they did not, they were forced to acknowledge Muslim authority, and also pay tribute (jizya). When the Muslim military officer (and one of the companions of the Islamic prophet, Muhammad) Sa'd ibn Abi Waqqas arrived to al-Mada'in, it was completely desolated, due to flight of the Sasanian royal family, nobles, and troops. However, the Muslims had managed to take some of the troops captive, and many riches were seized from the Sasanian treasury and given to the Muslim troops. In 637 Sa`d made al-Qa'qa' ibn 'Amr al-Tamimi responsible for the defense of al-Mada'in, and Shurahbil ibn al-Simt as the governor of al-Mada'in. The Persian companion of the Islamic prophet Muhammad, Salman the Persian was buried in al-Mada'in in 656/7.

In 661, al-Mada'in was under control of the Umayyad Caliphate, which had put an end to the Rashidun Caliphate. A certain Simak ibn 'Ubayd al-'Absi served as the governor of the metropolis in 663, and another person named Ishaq ibn Mas'ud served as its governor in 685. The Azariqa, a faction of the Kharijites, attacked al-Mada'in in 687/8, and massacred its inhabitants. The city was then governed by Kardam ibn Martad ibn Najaba, and some time later by Yazid ibn al-Harith al-Shaybani. In 696, the Kharjite leader Shabib ibn Yazid al-Shaybani briefly occupied al-Mada'in. In 697, Mutarrif ibn al-Mughira was made the governor of al-Mada'in, and later in 701, Hanzala ibn al-Warrad and Ibn 'Attab ibn Warqa' were appointed as the combined governors of the metropolis. Some time later, the governorship of al-Mada'in was abolished.

== Abbasid period ==
Map of Iraq and surrounding regions in the early ninth century

In 750, the Abbasid family captured al-Mada'in and the rest of Iraq, and declared themselves as the new caliphate. In 754, the Abbasid caliph al-Mansur briefly held his court at Rumiya (which was included in al-Mada'in). He also had his prominent military officer Abu Muslim killed at the same place. In 755, the White Palace of al-Mada'in was destroyed under the orders of al-Mansur, who wanted to create a new city, which would later get completed in 762, and would be known as Baghdad, and would become the new capital of the Abbasid Caliphate (although he ordered the White Palace to be restored, it remained in decay). After the foundation of Baghdad, the decline of al-Mada'in became faster, and many of the inhabitants resettled in Baghdad, while the Church of the East patriarch and the exilarch were forced to move to the city. Nevertheless, the patriarch Timothy I founded a hospital at al-Mada'in in 790.

During the Fourth Fitna (809–813) between Caliph al-Amin (r. 809–813), and his brother al-Ma'mun (r. 813–833), al-Mada'in was captured in 812 by al-Ma'mun's general Tahir ibn Husayn, who then marched towards Baghdad. In 817, the people of Baghdad revolted, and proclaimed the Abbasid prince Ibrahim ibn al-Mahdi as their leader. The rebels also managed to capture Baghdad's surrounding regions, which included al-Mada'in. One year later, al-Mada'in was recaptured by al-Ma'mun's Persian officer al-Hasan ibn Sahl, and by the next year, Iraq was once again under the control of al-Ma'mun.

During the Abbasid civil war (865–866), Abu'l-Saj Devdad, a relative of the Iranian prince Khaydhar ibn Kawus al-Afshin, was put charge in the defense of al-Mada'in in 865. The Abbasid caliphs al-Mu'tadid (r. 892–902) and al-Muqtafi (r. 902–908) further ruined al-Mada'in by digging it up for building materials to construct the Taj Palace in Baghdad. In August 942, a battle occurred at al-Mada'in between a combined Hamdanid-Turkish army and the Baridis, who both fought for the de facto rule over Iraq. The battle ended in a Baridi defeat.

== Buyid period ==
In 945, the Iranian Buyid prince Ahmad ibn Buya seized al-Mada'in including the rest of Iraq, and made the Caliph his vassal. In 974, the Turkish rebel Sabuktakin seized al-Mada'in and much of Iraq from Mu'izz al-Dawla's son and successor Izz al-Dawla, however by 975 the rebels were defeated. However, one year later, after the death of the Buyid supreme leader Rukn al-Dawla, a civil war ensured between Izz al-Dawla and his cousin, 'Adud al-Dawla, who ruled Fars, Oman, and Kerman. 'Adud al-Dawla eventually managed to emerge victorious, and conquer all of Iraq.

After the death of 'Adud al-Dawla in 983, he was succeeded by his son Samsam al-Dawla, who, however, met resistance by his brother Sharaf al-Dawla, who conquered Fars and Kerman. In 987, Sharaf al-Dawla captured al-Mada'in and then conquered the rest of Iraq. Between 999 and 1002, the Asadis and the Uqaylids made several incursions into Iraq, and even captured al-Mada'in. In 1002, they defended al-Mada'in from a counter-attack by Sharaf al-Dawla's brother and successor, Baha' al-Dawla (r. 988–1012). A battle shortly ensured at Hillah between a combined Asadis-Uqaylids army and a Buyid army under Abu Ja'far al-Hajjaj, who had received reinforcements by Bedouins and the Kurdish Annazids. The battle ended in a Buyid victory, and resulted in the reconquest of al-Mada'in and the rest of Iraq.

== Seljuq period and Abbasid insurgency ==
In 1055, the ruler of the Turkic Seljuk Empire, Tughril, invaded Iraq and made the Buyid ruler of the region, Al-Malik al-Rahim, his vassal. In 1199, the Jews of al-Mada'in complained about the construction of a mosque that was close to their synagogue. They then openly revolted, and attacked the leader of the mosque and his supporters, with ended in a Muslim defeat. The Muslims then complained to al-Nasir's secretary and requested for aid. Al-Nasir agreed to help, and had the synagogue destroyed.

== Safavid and Ottoman period ==
The tomb of Salman the Persian was restored during the reign of the Ottoman Sultan Murad IV (r. 1623–40) and was further restored in 1904–1905.

== Population and religion ==
During the Sasanian period, population of al-Mada'in was heavily mixed, it included Arameans, Persians, Greeks, and Assyrians. Several religions were also practiced in the metropolis, which included Christianity, Judaism, and Zoroastrianism. The population also included Manicheans, who continued to be mentioned in al-Mada'in during Umayyad rule. Much of the population fled from al-Mada'in after the Arab capture of the metropolis. However, a portion of Persians remained there, and some important figures of these people are known to have provided Ali with presents, which he, however, refused to take. After the Battle of Siffin, the Persian population of al-Mada'in disappeared.

During the early Islamic period, the population of al-Mada'in consisted of tribal Arab leaders from Kufa, leaders of the Banu Azd, and figures of prominent Muslim families, who were, unlike the rest of population, not tribal. A companion of the Islamic prophet Muhammad, Hudhayfah ibn al-Yaman was one of these Arab leaders from Kufa, and is known to have had a Christian or Jewish woman from al-Mada'in as his wife, who, he, however, was forced by the Rashidun Caliph Umar to divorce because of the population of marriageable Muslim women in the metropolis was enough to marry.

However, during this period much of the population of al-Mada'in resettled in the cities of Basra and Kufa, Wasit, and Baghdad. But at the same time people also moved to the metropolis from Kufa, Basra, and other places. Prominent figures such as Hilal ibn Khabab (who was from Kufa) and Nasr ibn Hajib al-Qurashi (who was from Khorasan) also moved to al-Mada'in. A very small minority of Zoroastrians also seems to have lived in the metropolis, such as the father of the Khurramite Babak Khorramdin, who had resettled in Azerbaijan and married a local woman, who bore him Babak. During the 13th century, the majority of al-Mada'in's population was Twelver Shia Muslim farmers.

== Archaeology ==
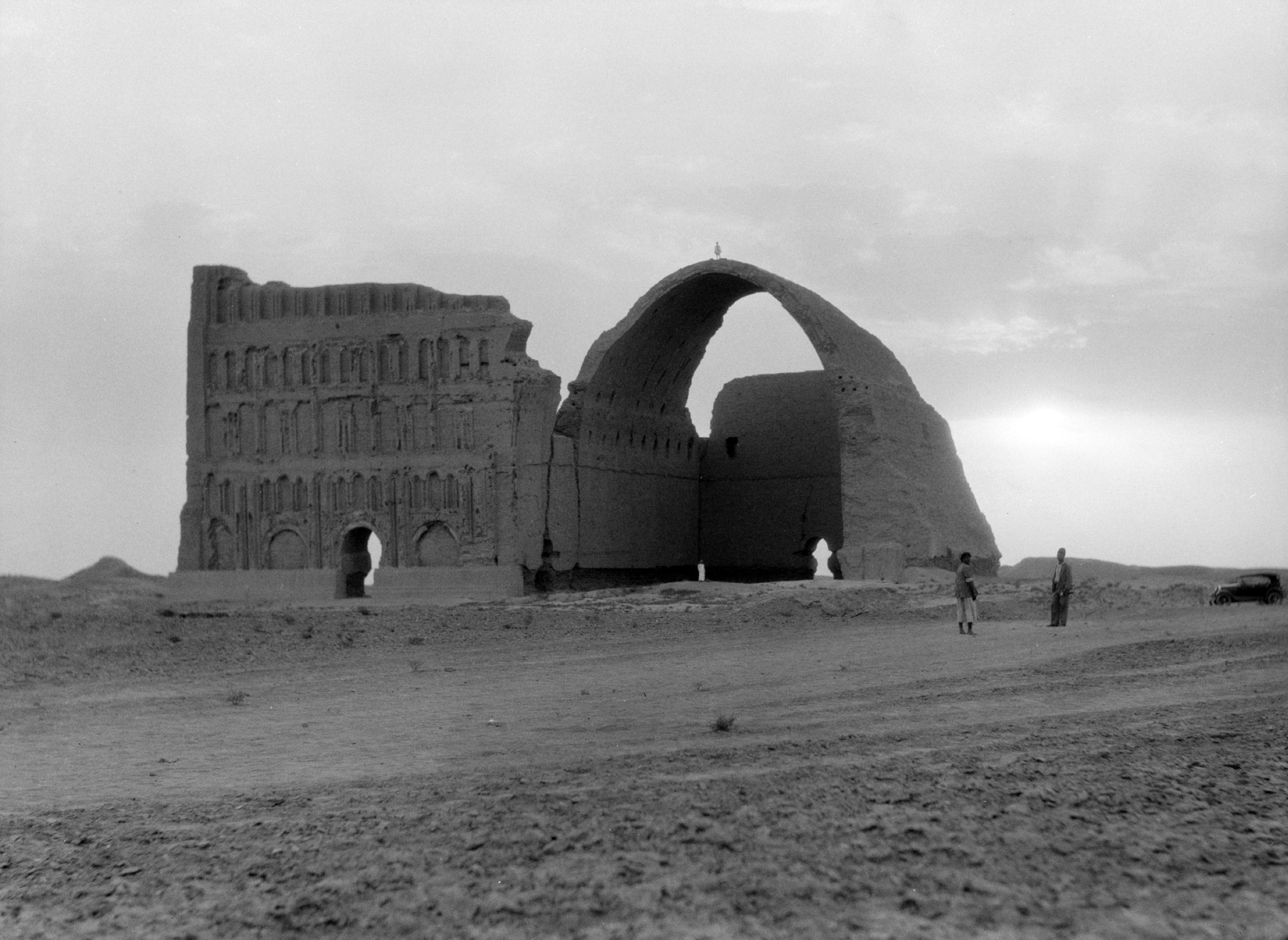
Great arch of Taq-i Kisra, 1921

Al-Mada'in has received considerable interest from archaeologists since the 18th century; the most famous landmark there is the Taq-i Kisra.

Excavation sites and ancient suburbs include:

- Seleucia
- Ctesiphon (previously thought to have been Opis, whose exact location is not confirmed)
- Aspanbur (Also written Isbanir, Asbanabr, Aspanbar, Asfanur)
- Veh Ardashir (Also Bahurasir, Coche, Choche)
- Valashabad (Balashkert), founded by Vologases I
- al-Ma’aridh
- Tell al-Dhaba’I
- Tell Dhahab
- Umm an Sa’atir

The site partially overlaps with the modern town of Salman Pak.

== See also ==
- Firuz Shapur
- Talmudic academies in Babylonia

== Sources ==
- Neggaz, Nassima (2021). "al-Madāʾin". In Fleet, Kate; Krämer, Gudrun; Matringe, Denis; Nawas, John; Rowson, Everett (eds.). Encyclopaedia of Islam (3rd ed.). Brill Online. ISSN 1873-9830.
- Morony, Michael (2009). "MADĀʾEN". Encyclopaedia Iranica.
- Amedroz, Henry F.; Margoliouth, David S., eds. (1921). The Eclipse of the 'Abbasid Caliphate. Original Chronicles of the Fourth Islamic Century, Vol. V: The concluding portion of The Experiences of Nations by Miskawaihi, Vol. II: Reigns of Muttaqi, Mustakfi, Muti and Ta'i. Oxford: Basil Blackwell.
- Rekaya, M. (1991). "al-Maʾmūn". In Bosworth, C. E.; van Donzel, E. & Pellat, Ch. (eds.). The Encyclopaedia of Islam, Second Edition. Volume VI: Mahk–Mid. Leiden: E. J. Brill. pp. 331–339. ISBN 978-90-04-08112-3.
- Kennedy, Hugh (2004) [1986]. The Prophet and the Age of the Caliphates: The Islamic Near East from the 6th to the 11th Century (Second ed.). Harlow: Longman. ISBN 978-0-582-40525-7.
- Zarrinkub, Abd al-Husain (1975). "The Arab conquest of Iran and its aftermath". In Frye, Richard N. (ed.). The Cambridge History of Iran: From the Arab Invasion to the Saljuqs. Vol. 4. Cambridge: Cambridge University Press. pp. 1–57. ISBN 0-521-20093-8.
- Bosworth, C. E. (1975). "Iran under the Buyids". In Frye, Richard N. (ed.). The Cambridge History of Iran: From the Arab Invasion to the Saljuqs. Vol. 4. Cambridge: Cambridge University Press. pp. 250–305. ISBN 0-521-20093-8.
- Kröger, Jens (1993). "CTESIPHON". Encyclopaedia Iranica, Vol. IV, Fasc. 4. pp. 446–448.
- Shapur Shahbazi, A. (2005). "SASANIAN DYNASTY". Encyclopaedia Iranica, Online Edition.
