= Deportation =

Expulsion of a person or group from a place or country

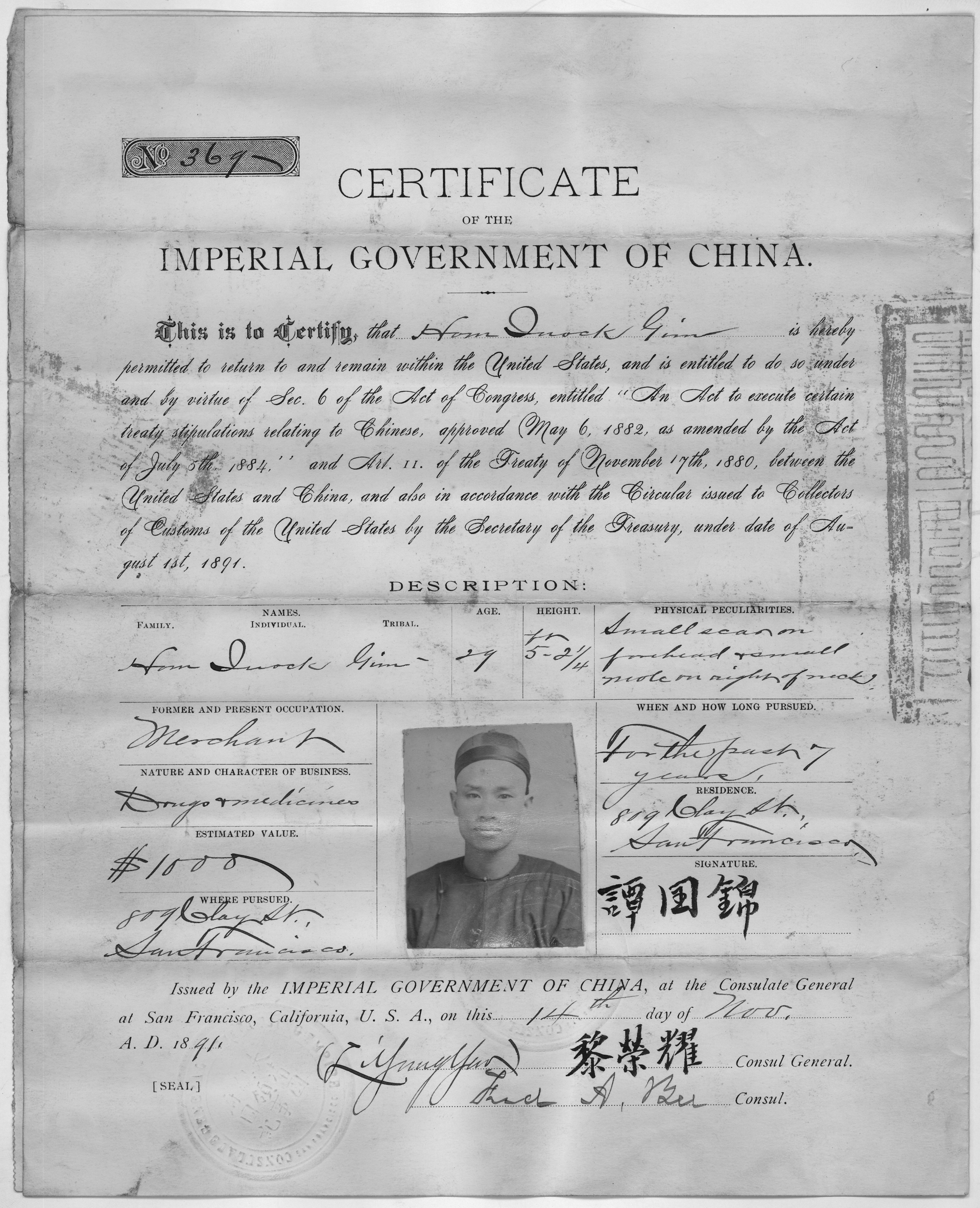
Certificate of identity of an individual seeking re-entry to the United States during the Chinese Exclusion Act era, among the Chinese deportation records of the US District court, Los Angeles County, California

Deportation is the expulsion of a person or group of people by a state from its sovereign territory. The actual definition changes depending on the place and context, and it also changes over time. A person who has been deported or is under sentence of deportation is called a deportee.

== Definition ==
Definitions of deportation vary: some include "transfer beyond State borders" (distinguishing it from forcible transfer), others consider it "the actual implementation of [an expulsion] order in cases where the person concerned does not follow it voluntarily". Others differentiate removal of legal immigrants (expulsion) from illegal immigrants (deportation).

Deportation in the most general sense, in accordance with International Organization for Migration, treats expulsion and deportation as synonyms in the context of migration, adding:

"The terminology used at the domestic or international level on expulsion and deportation is not uniform but there is a clear tendency to use the term expulsion to refer to the legal order to leave the territory of a State, and removal or deportation to refer to the actual implementation of such order in cases where the person concerned does not follow it voluntarily."

According to the European Court of Human Rights, collective expulsion is any measure compelling non-nationals, as a group, to leave a country, except where such a measure is taken on the basis of a reasonable and objective examination of the particular case of each individual non-national of the group. Mass expulsion may also occur when members of an ethnic group are sent out of a state regardless of nationality. Collective expulsion, or expulsion en masse, is prohibited by several instruments of international law.

== History ==
=== Antiquity ===
Expulsions occurred in ancient history. They were well-recorded particularly in ancient Mesopotamia. The kingdoms of Israel and Judah faced several forced expulsions, including deportations by the Neo-Assyrian Empire following the fall of Israel and during Sennacherib's campaign in the 8th century BC. Later, the Neo-Babylonian Empire deported much of the Judean population upon conquering Judah in 597 BC and 587 BC.

==== Deportation in the Achaemenid Empire ====
Deportation was practiced as a policy toward rebellious people in Achaemenid Empire. The precise legal status of the deportees is unclear; but ill-treatment is not recorded. Instances include:

Deportations in the Achaemenid Empire
Deported people	Deported to	Deporter
6,000 Egyptians (including the king Amyrtaeus and many artisans)	Susa	Cambyses II
Barcaeans	A village in Bactria	Darius I
Paeonians of Thrace	Sardes, Asia Minor (later returned)	Darius I
Milesians	Ampé, on the mouth of Tigris near the Persian Gulf	Darius I
Carians and Sitacemians	Babylonia	
Eretrians	Ardericca in Susiana	Darius I
Beotians	Tigris region	
Sidonian prisoners of war	Susa and Babylon	Artaxerxes III
Jews who supported the Sidonian revolt	Hyrcania	Artaxerxes III

==== Deportation in the Parthian Empire ====
Unlike in the Achaemenid and Sassanian periods, records of deportation are rare during the Arsacid Parthian period. One notable example was the deportation of the Mards in Charax, near Ray by Phraates I. The 10,000 Roman prisoners of war after the Battle of Carrhae appear to have been deported to Merv near the eastern border in 53 BC, who are said to married to local people. It is hypothesized that some of them founded the Chinese city of Liqian after becoming soldiers for the Xiongnu tribe, but this is doubted.

Hyrcanus II, the Jewish king of Jerusalem, was settled among the Jews of Babylon in Parthia after being taken as captive by the Parthian-Jewish forces in 40 BC.

Roman POWs in the Antony's Parthian War may have suffered deportation.

==== Deportation in the Sasanian empire ====
Deportation was widely used by the Sasanians, especially during the wars with the Romans.

During Shapur I's reign, the Romans (including Valerian) who were defeated at the Battle of Edessa were deported to Persis. Other destinations were Parthia, Khuzestan, and Asorestan. There were cities which were founded and were populated by Romans prisoners of war, including Shadh-Shapur (Dayr Mikhraq) in Meshan, Bishapur in Persis, Wuzurg-Shapur (Ukbara; Marw-Ḥābūr), and Gundeshapur. Agricultural land were also given to the deportees. These deportations initiated the spread Christianity in the Sassanian empire. In Rēw-Ardashīr (Rishahr; Yarānshahr), Persis, there was a church for the Romans and another one for Carmanians. Their hypothesized decisive role in the spread of Christianity in Persia and their major contribution to Persian economy has been recently criticized by Mosig-Walburg (2010). In the mid-3rd century, Greek-speaking deportees from north-western Syria were settled in Kashkar, Mesopotamia.

After the Arab incursion into Persia during Shapur II's reign, he scattered the defeated Arab tribes by deporting them to other regions. Some were deported to Bahrain and Kirman, possibly to both populate these unattractive regions (due to their climate) and bringing the tribes under control.

In 395 AD 18,000 Roman populations of Sophene, Armenia, Mesopotamia, Syria, and Cappadocia were captured and deported by the "Huns". the prisoners were freed by the Persians as they reached Persia, and were settled in Slōk (Wēh Ardashīr) and Kōkbā (Kōkhē). The author of the text Liber Calipharum has praised the king Yazdegerd I (399–420) for his treatment of the deportees, who also allowed some to return.

Major deportations occurred during the Anastasian War, including Kavad I's deportation of the populations of Theodosiopolis and Amida to Arrajan (Weh-az-Amid Kavad).

Major deportations occurred during the campaigns of Khosrau I from the Roman cities of Sura, Beroea, Antioch, Apamea, Callinicum, and Batnai in Osrhoene, to Wēh-Antiyōk-Khosrow (also known as Rūmagān; in Arabic: al-Rūmiyya). The city was founded near Ctesiphon especially for them, and Khosrow reportedly "did everything in his power to make the residents want to stay". The number of the deportees is recorded to be 292,000 in another source.

=== Middle Ages ===
The Medieval European age was marked with several large religious deportations, including that of Christians, Jews and Muslims. For instance, the Almoravid deported Christians from Spain to Morocco, with mass deportations taking place in 1109, 1126, 1130 and 1138.

=== Modern deportation ===
With the beginning of the Age of Discovery, deporting individuals to an overseas colony also became common practice. As early as the 16th century, degredados formed a substantial portion of early colonists in Portuguese empire. From 1717 onward Britain deported around 40,000 British religious objectors and "criminals" to America before the practice ceased in 1776. Jailers sold the "criminals" to shipping contractors, who then sold them to plantation owners. The "criminals" worked for the plantation owner for the duration of their sentence. After Britain lost control of the area which became the United States, Australia became the destination for "criminals" deported to British colonies. Britain transported more than 160,000 British "criminals" to the Australian colonies between 1787 and 1855.

Meanwhile, in Japan during Sakoku, all Portuguese and Spanish people were expelled from the country.

In the 18th century the Tipu Sultan, of Mysore, deported tens of thousands of civilians, from lands he had annexed, to serve as slave labour in other parts of his empire, for example the: Captivity of Mangalorean Catholics at Seringapatam.

In the late 19th century the United States of America began designating "desired" and "undesired" immigrants, leading to the birth of illegal immigration and subsequent deportation of immigrants when found in irregular situations. Starting with the Chinese Exclusion Act, the US government has since deported more than 55 million immigrants, the majority of whom came from Latin-American countries.

At the beginning of the 20th century the control of immigration began becoming common practice, with the Immigration Restriction Act 1901 in Australia, the Aliens Act 1905 in the United Kingdom and the Continuous journey regulation of 1908 in Canada, elevating the deportation of "illegal" immigrants to a global scale.

In the meantime, deportation of "regular residents" also increased.

==== United States ====
During Donald Trump’s first year back in office, the monthly rate of ICE deportion flights more than doubled, and increased to 79 countries compared with 45 during Joe Biden's final year.

As a percent of US population, recent figures for enforcement actions are similar to those in several past decades.

Title 42 expulsions from the southwest U.S. border at the time of the COVID-19 pandemic

In the 1930s, during the Great Depression, more stringent enforcement of immigration laws were ordered by the executive branch of the U.S. government, which led to increased deportation and repatriation to Mexico. In the 1930s, during the Great Depression, between 355,000 and 2 million Mexicans and Mexican Americans were deported or repatriated to Mexico, an estimated 40 to 60% of whom were U.S. citizens – overwhelmingly children. At least 82,000 Mexicans were formally deported between 1929 and 1935 by the government. Voluntary repatriations were more common than deportations.

In 1954, the executive branch of the U.S. government implemented Operation Wetback, a program created in response to public hysteria about immigration and immigrants from Mexico. Operation Wetback led to the deportation of nearly 1.3 million Mexicans from the United States.

==== Nazi Germany ====
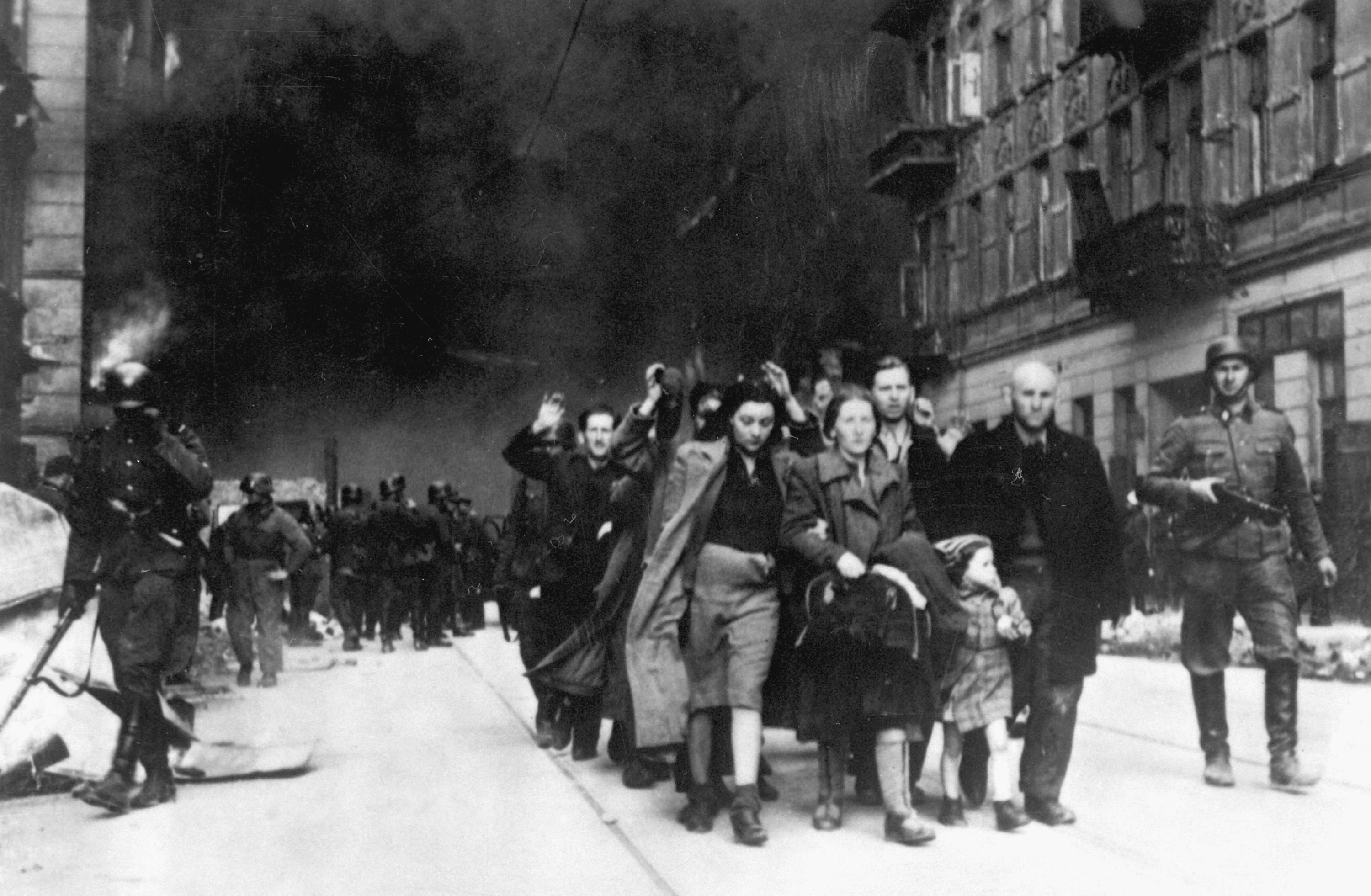
People being deported during the Warsaw Ghetto Uprising

Nazi policies deported homosexuals, Jews, Poles, and Romani from their established places of residence to Nazi concentration camps or extermination camps set up at a considerable distance from their original residences. During the Holocaust, the Nazis made heavy use of euphemisms, where "deportation" frequently meant the victims were subsequently killed, as opposed to simply being relocated.

==== Russia and the Soviet Union ====
The Grand Principality of Moscow developed policies of internal exile - the transfer of undesirable individuals or groups to remote territories. An early example of population exchange occurred following Moscow's conquest of the Novgorod Republic in the 15th century. The Tsardom of Russia, the Russian Empire, the Soviet Union and the Russian Federation continued similar practices as a more humane alternative to execution, deporting undesirables with or without sentences of forced labor - instituting katorga, the Gulag system and corrective labor colonies. In the 19th century, for example, rebellious Poles and Decembrists found themselves in Siberia, and Dostoevsky experienced katorga in Siberia and exile in Central Asia. Prior to 1917 several early Bolsheviks served time in remote cities and governorates.

The Soviet Union, especially under Joseph Stalin during the 1930s and 1940s, carried out forced mass-transfers of some 6 million people, resulting in millions of deaths. As many as 110 separate deportations have been catalogued, included the targeting of at least 13 distinct ethnicities and 8 entire nations. Many historians have described Soviet deportations as ethnic cleansing, crimes against humanity, and/or genocide.

Besides the imprisonment of dissidents (such as Vladimir Kara-Murza and Alexei Navalny) in remote outposts, the Russian Federation has deported Ukrainians in the course of the Russo-Ukrainian War (2014 onwards).

==== Azerbaijan ====
The Karabakh movement for independence was met with a series of pogroms and forced deportations of Armenians across Azerbaijan. Notable examples include Operation Ring in 1991 as well as the expulsion of all Armenians from Nagorno-Karabakh in 2023.

==== Independent State of Croatia ====
An estimated 120,000 Serbs were deported from the Independent State of Croatia to German-occupied Serbia, and 300,000 fled by 1943.

=== Contemporary ===
All countries reserve the right to deport persons without right of abode, even those who are longtime residents or possess permanent residency. In general, foreigners who have committed serious crimes, entered the country illegally, overstayed or broken the conditions of their visa, or otherwise lost their legal status to remain in the country may be administratively removed or deported.

Since the 1980s, the world also saw the development of practices of externalization/"offshoring immigrants", currently being used by Australia, Canada, the United States, the United Kingdom, and the European Union. Some of the countries in the Persian Gulf have even used this to deport their own citizens, paying the Comoros to give them passports and accept them.

The period after the fall of the Iron Curtain showed increased deportation and readmission agreements in parts of Europe.

During its invasion of Ukraine, the Russian Federation has perpetrated mass deportations of Ukrainian citizens to Russia and occupied territories. While independent numbers are difficult to come by, and depending on the degree of Russian coercion or force required to meet the definition of "deported", reported numbers range from tens of thousands to 4.5 million deportees.

The Dominican Republic deported more than 250,000 Haitians and Dominicans of Haitian descent to Haiti in 2023.

Deportation of undocumented Afghans from Pakistan since 2023. By January 2025, over 813,300 individuals had been repatriated to Afghanistan.

Deportation in the second presidency of Donald Trump since 2025. The Trump administration has claimed that around 140,000 people had been deported as of April 2025, though some estimates put the number at roughly half that amount.

In May 2025, the Iranian government ordered the mass deportation of an estimated 4 million Afghan migrants and refugees to Taliban-controlled Afghanistan.

== Noteworthy deportees ==
Alexander Berkman, Emma Goldman, C.L.R. James, Claudia Jones, Fritz Julius Kuhn, Lucky Luciano, and Anna Sage were all deported from the United States by being arrested and brought to the federal immigration control station on Ellis Island in New York Harbor and, from there, forcibly removed from the United States on ships.

== Opposition ==
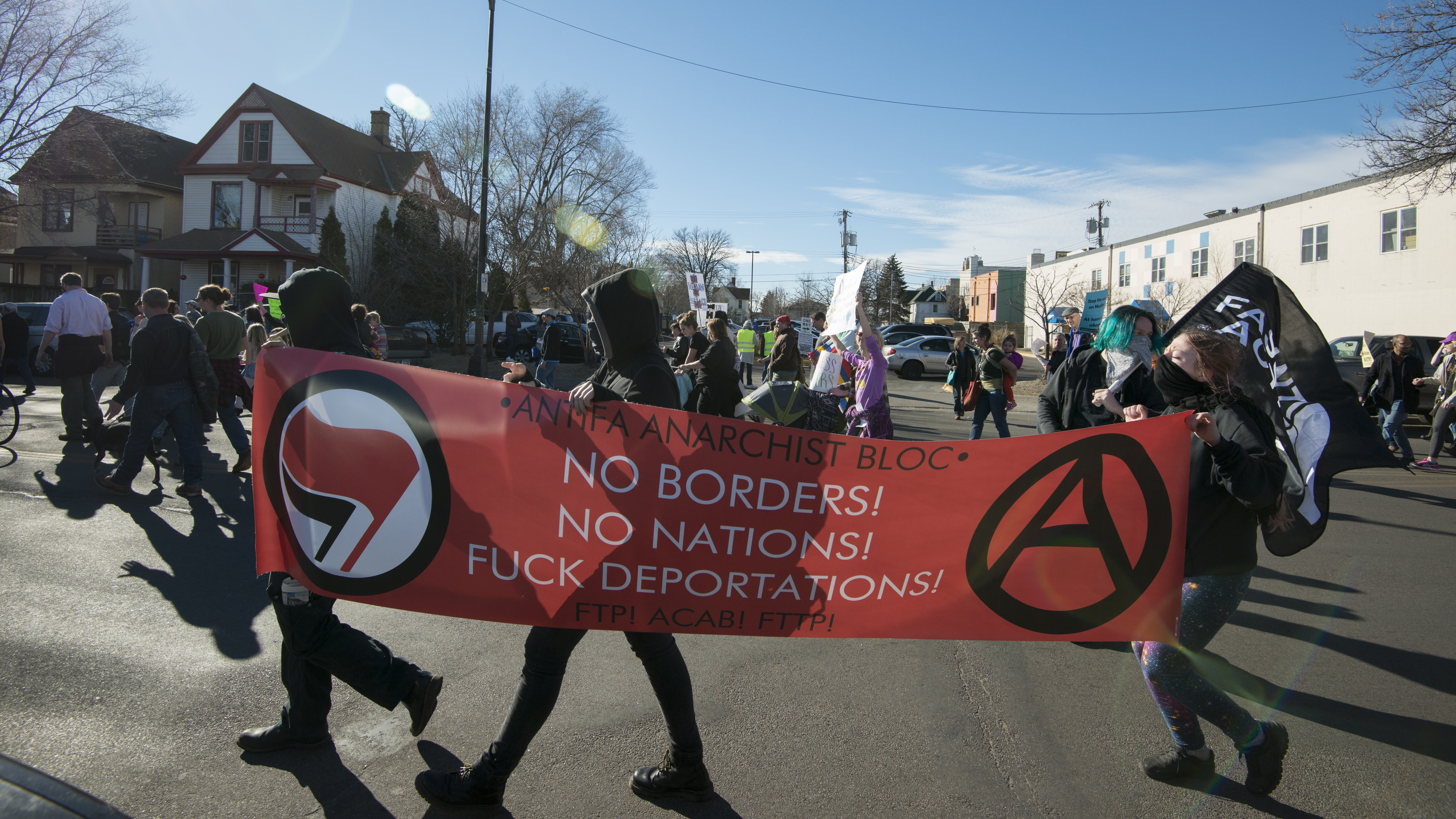
Anarchists protesting against deportations

Many criticize deportations as inhumane, as well as questioning their effectiveness. Some are completely opposed towards any deportations, while others state it is inhumane to take somebody to a foreign land without their consent.

== In popular culture ==
In literature, deportation appears as an overriding theme in the 1935 novel, Strange Passage by Theodore D. Irwin. Films depicting or dealing with fictional cases of deportation are many and varied. Among them are Ellis Island (1936), Exile Express (1939), Five Came Back (1939), Deported (1950), and Gambling House (1951). More recently, Shottas (2002) treated the issue of U.S. deportation to the Caribbean post-1997.

== See also ==
- immigration lawyer
- Acadian deportation
- Diaspora
- Denaturalization
- Deplatforming
- Depopulation of Diego Garcia
- Ethnic cleansing
- Forced migration
- Flight and expulsion of Germans (1944–50)
- Impediment to expulsion
- Indian Removal Act
- June deportation
- Monopoly on violence
- Operation Priboi
- Penal transportation
- Population transfer
- Population transfer in the Soviet Union
- Prussian deportations of 1885–1890
- Remigration
- Removal proceedings
- Right of return
- Seminole Wars
- Soviet deportations from Estonia
- Israelite deportation
- Exile
