= Seleucia =

Seleucid Empire capital in modern Iraq

- ܣܠܝܩ (Classical Syriac) (Salīq); Σελεύκεια (Ancient Greek)
- Seleukeia, Salīq, Seleucia-on-Tigris, Seleucia on the Tigris
- Archeological map of Seleucia and Ctesiphon sites

- Location within Iraq
- 33°5′40″N 44°31′20″E
- Type: Settlement
- Periods: Hellenistic to Roman Imperial
- Cultures: Greek, Parthian, Sasanian
- Location: Baghdad Governorate, Iraq
- Region: Mesopotamia

History
- Built: c. 305 BC
- Built by: Seleucus I Nicator
- Abandoned: 165 AD

Site notes
- Area: 5.5 km^{2} (2.1 sq mi)
- Excavation dates: 1927–1932, 1936–1937, 1964–1968, 1985–1989
- Archaeologists: Leroy Waterman, Clark Hopkins, Antonio Invernizzi, Giorgio Gullini

Seleucia (/sɪˈljuːʃə/; Ancient Greek: Σελεύκεια), also known as Seleucia-on-Tigris, Seleucia on the Tigris or Seleucia ad Tigrim, was a major Mesopotamian city, located on the west bank of the Tigris River within the present-day Baghdad Governorate in Iraq. It was founded around 305 BC by Seleucus I Nicator as the first capital of the Seleucid Empire, and remained an important center of trade and Hellenistic culture after the imperial capital relocated to Antioch. The city continued to flourish under Parthian rule beginning in 141 BC; ancient texts claim that it reached a population of 600,000. Seleucia was destroyed in 165 AD by Roman general Avidius Cassius and gradually faded into obscurity in the subsequent centuries. The site was rediscovered in the 1920s by archaeologists.

== Names ==
Seleucia (Ancient Greek: Σελεύκεια, Seleúkeia) is named for Seleucus I Nicator, who enlarged an earlier settlement and made it the capital of his empire around 305 BC. It was the largest and most important of the many cities to bear its name but is sometimes distinguished as Seleucia-on-Tigris or Seleucia on the Tigris (Latin: Seleucia ad Tigridem) from the name of its river.

Texts from the Church of the East's synods referred to the city as Salīq (Syriac: ܣܠܝܩ) or sometimes Māḥôzē (Syriac: ܡܚܘܙ̈ܐ) when referring to the metropolis of Seleucia-Ctesiphon.

The Sassanids named the eastern city as Veh-Ardashir (Persian: ویه‌اردشیر); Arabs called it Bahurasīr.

== History ==
=== Seleucid Empire ===
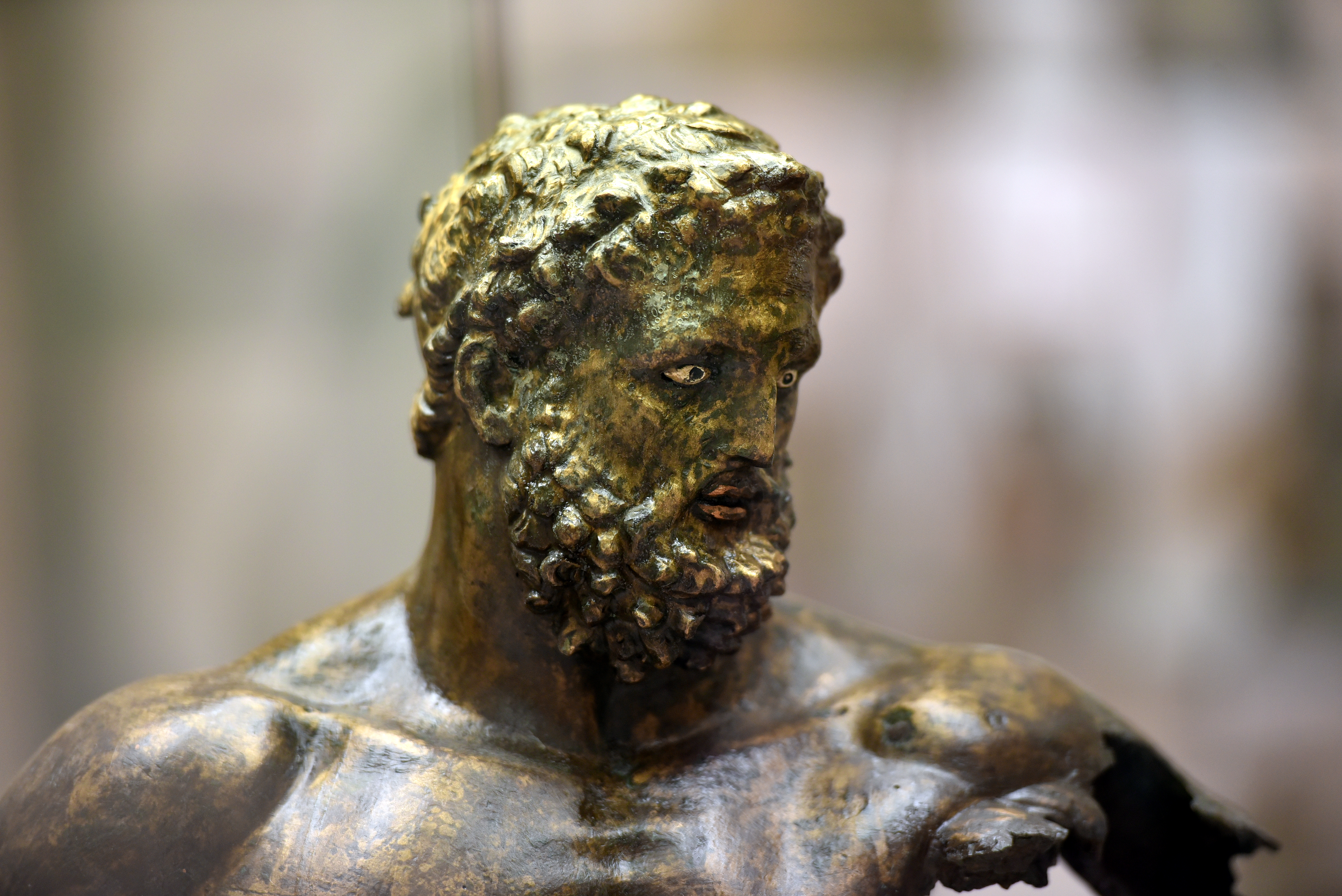
The upper part of a bronze statuette of Hercules (also bronze Heracles of Mesene or Characene), from Seleucia, Iraq. Both thighs (not shown, see below) have a bilingual inscription (Greek and Parthian), Iraq Museum, Baghdad.

Seleucia, as such, was founded as the first capital of the Seleucid Empire by Seleucus I Nicator. A foundation date of 300 BC was proposed by Auguste Bouch-Leclerq in 1914. Other scholars proposed 306 BC and 312 BC. Seleucus was one of the Diadochi successors of Alexander the Great who, after Alexander's death, divided his empire among themselves. Although Seleucus soon moved his main capital to Antioch, in northern Syria, Seleucia became an important center of trade, Hellenistic culture, and regional government under the Seleucids.

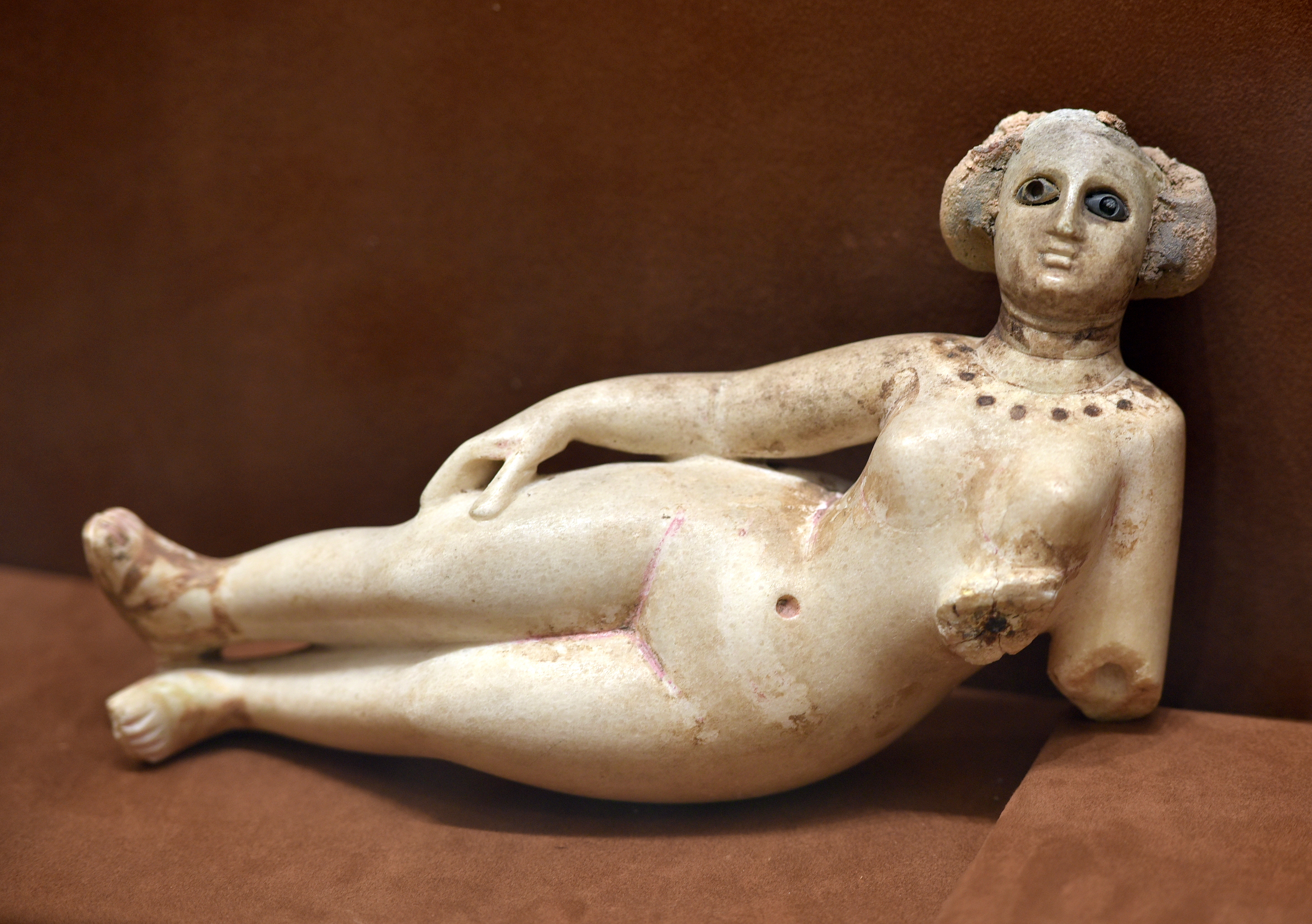
Small statuette of a naked woman, from Seleucia on the Tigris, Iraq, 3rd–2nd century BC. Iraq Museum, Baghdad

To make his capital into a metropolis, Seleucus forced almost all inhabitants of Babylon, except the local temple priests/supporting workers, to leave and resettle in Seleucia. A tablet dated 275 BC states that the inhabitants of Babylon were transported to Seleucia, where a palace and a temple (Esagila) were built. Standing at the confluence of the Tigris River with a major canal from the Euphrates, Seleucia was placed to receive traffic from both great waterways.

During the 3rd and 2nd centuries BC, it was one of the great Hellenistic cities, comparable to Alexandria in Egypt, and greater than Syrian Antioch. Excavations indicate that the walls of the city enclosed an area of at least 550 hectares (1,400 acres), equivalent to a square roughly 1.5 miles (2.5 kilometers) on a side. Based on this size, the population has been estimated to number over 100,000 initially and probably more later. Its surrounding region might have supported half a million people.

Polybius (5,52ff) uses the Macedonian peliganes for the council of Seleucia, which implies a Macedonian colony, consistent with its rise to prominence under Seleucus I; Pausanias (1,16) records that Seleucus also settled Babylonians there. Archaeological finds support the presence of a large population not of Greek culture.

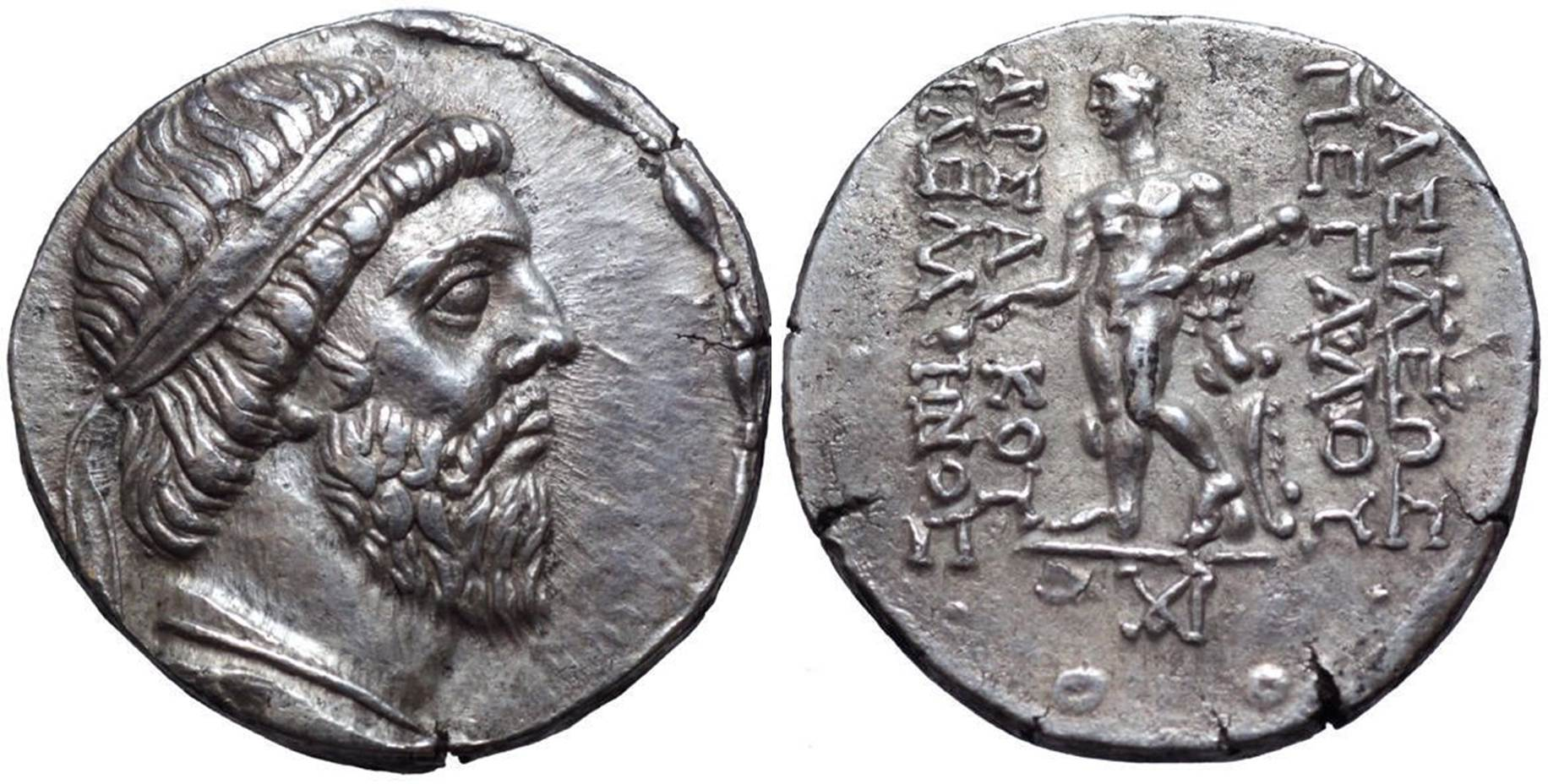
Tetradrachm of Mithridates I; Seleucia on the Tigris mint.

In 141 BC, the Parthians under Mithridates I conquered the city, and Seleucia became the western capital of the Parthian Empire. Tacitus described its walls, and mentioned that it was, even under Parthian rule, a fully Hellenistic city. Ancient texts claim that the city had 600,000 inhabitants, and was ruled by a senate of 300 people. It was clearly one of the largest cities in the Western world; only Rome, Alexandria, and possibly Antioch were more populous.

In 55 BC, a battle fought near Seleucia was crucial in establishing dynastic succession of the Arsacid kings. In this battle between the reigning Mithridates III (supported by a Roman army of Aulus Gabinius, governor of Syria) and the previously deposed Orodes II, the reigning monarch was defeated, allowing Orodes to re-establish himself as king. In 41 BC, Seleucia was the scene of a massacre of around 5,000 Babylonian Jewish refugees (Josephus, Ant. xviii. 9, § 9).

In 117 AD, Seleucia was burned down by the Roman emperor Trajan during his conquest of Mesopotamia, but the following year it was ceded back to the Parthians by Trajan's successor, Hadrian, then rebuilt in the Parthian style. It was completely destroyed by the Roman general Avidius Cassius in 165.

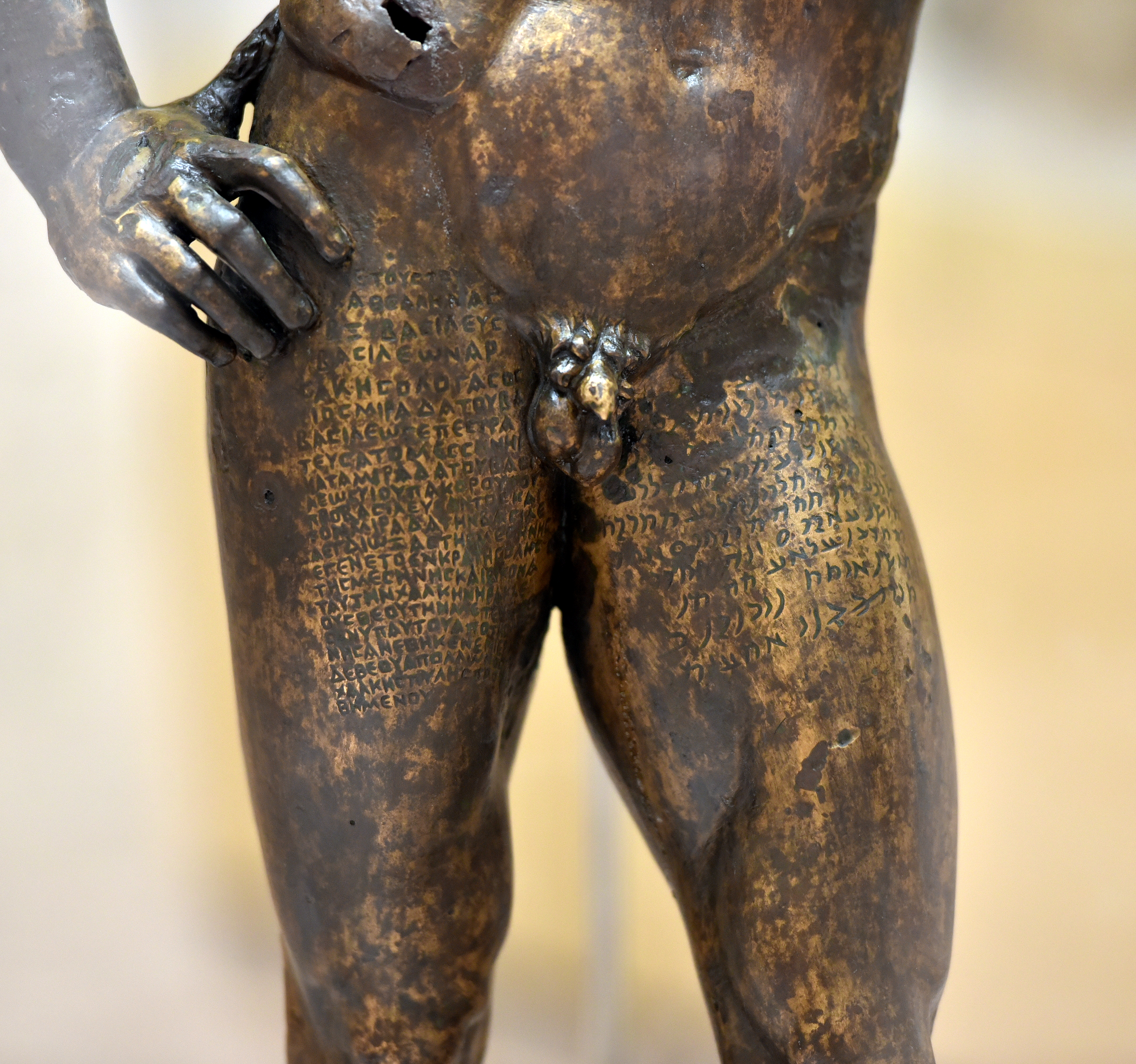
Detail, inscribed, Greek and Parthian script, lower part of a bronze statuette of Hercules, from Seleucia on the Tigris, Iraq. Iraq Museum

=== Sasanian rule ===
Over sixty years later a new city, Veh-Ardashir, was built across the river by Persian emperor Ardashir I. This new city was long believed to be located at Seleucia but was shown by Italian excavations to be a fresh construction separate from Seleucia and Ctesiphon. There were active Christian churches in Mesopotamia from the 1st century onwards and in the 3rd or 4th century Seleucia became an important centre.

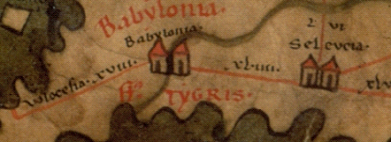
Seleucia in the 4th century on the Peutinger Map.

Following the edict of toleration by the Persian Sasanian King Yazdegerd I, which for the time being brought an end to the persecution of Christians, which had lasted for 70 years, the remaining Christians set about reorganizing and strengthening the church.

The Council of Seleucia-Ctesiphon (The Synod of Mar Isaac) met in 410 AD under the presidency of Mar Isaac, the bishop of Seleucia-Ctesiphon. The most important decision of the Synod which had a very far reaching effect on the life of the church, was to declare the bishop of Seleucia-Ctesiphon as the primate of the Church of the East; and in recognition of this pre-eminence he was given the title 'Catholicos'. The Synod confirmed Mar Isaac as Catholicos and Archbishop of all the Orient. The Synod also declared its adherence to the decision of the Council of Nicaea and subscribed to the Nicene Creed. The Canons of the Synod leave no doubt as to the authority of the great Metropolitan, the Catholicos of Seleucia-Ctesiphon. Without his approval, no election of bishop would be valid.

Towards the end of the reign of Yazdegerd I, the Christians in the Sasanian Empire were again persecuted in 420. Dadyeshu was elected Catholicos in 421 and himself suffered during the persecution and was imprisoned. When he was released he resigned and left Seleucia, but the church refused to accept the resignation and there followed the Synod of Dadyeshu, which met in 424 in Markabta of the Arabs under the presidency of Mar Dadyeshu. It proved to be one of the most significant of all Persian synods. The first synod of Isaac in 410 had decided that the Catholicos of Seleucia-Ctesiphon be supreme among the bishops of the East. The Synod of Dadyeshu decided that the Catholicos should be the sole head of the Church of the East and that no ecclesiastical authority should be acknowledged above him. For the first time, this synod referred to the Catholicos as Patriarch and that their Catholicos was answerable to God alone. This had some effect in reassuring the Sasanian monarchy that the Persian Christians were not influenced by the Roman enemy.

The city eventually faded into obscurity and was swallowed by the desert sands, probably abandoned after the Tigris shifted its course.

== Archaeology ==
The site of Seleucia was rediscovered in the 1920s by archaeologists looking for Opis.

Beginning in 1927, University of Michigan professors Leroy Waterman (1927–1932) and Clark Hopkins (1936–1937) oversaw excavations for the Kelsey Museum of Archaeology on behalf of the American School of Oriental Research of Baghdad with funds supplied by the Toledo Museum of Art and the Cleveland Museum of Art. Finds included many coins, mostly bronze, salt receipts with the name of Seleucia, a blue glazed incense burner, now in the Baghdad museum, a stele inscribed in Greek, numerous beads, metal objects including weights and surgeons instruments, and one pre-Sargonic brick.

From 1964 to 1968 and then between 1985 and 1989, an Italian mission from the University of Turin directed by Antonio Invernizzi and Giorgio Gullini excavated at the site. They found a Seleucid archive building with about 30,000 seal impressions, all in a fully Greek style.

In an outer wall of the Parthian period, a reused brick dated by stamp to 821 BC, during the Neo-Assyrian period.

== See also ==
- List of cities of the ancient Near East
- Veh-Ardashir

== Sources ==
- G. R. F. Assar., "Parthian Calendars at Babylon and Seleucia on the Tigris", Iran, vol. 41, pp. 171–91, 2003
- Messina, Vito, "FURTHER BULLAE FROM SELEUCIA ON THE TIGRIS", Iraq, vol. 76, pp. 123–40, 2014
- INVERNIZZI, ANTONIO, "Portraits of Seleucid Kings on the Sealings from Seleucia-on-the-Tigris: A Reassessment", Bulletin of the Asia Institute, vol. 12, pp. 105–12, 1998
- L.T. Doty, A Cuneiform Tablet from Tell Umar, Mesopotamia, vol. XIII-XIV, pp. 13–14 and 91-98, 1978–79
- MØRKHOLM, OTTO, "The Parthian Coinage of Seleucia on the Tigris, c. 90-55 B.C", The Numismatic Chronicle (1966-), vol. 20 (140), pp. 33–47, 1980
- G. Pettinato, Cuneiform Inscriptions Discovered at Seleucia on the Tigris», Mesopotamia, vol. V-VI, pp. 49–66, 1970–71
- A. Invernizzi, Ten Years Research in the al-Mada'in Area. Seleucia and Ctesiphon, Sumer, vol. 32, pp. 167–175, 1976
- Waggoner, Nancy M., "THE EARLY ALEXANDER COINAGE AT SELEUCIA ON THE TIGRIS", Museum Notes (American Numismatic Society), vol. 15, pp. 21–30, 1969
