= Khuzayma ibn Khazim =

Abbasid official and military leader (died 818/9)

Khuzayma ibn Khazim خزيمة بن خازم
- Died: 818/9; Baghdad
- Relatives: Khazim ibn Khuzayma (father), Abdallah ibn Khazim, Shu'ayb ibn Khazim, Ibrahim ibn Khazim (brothers)
- Military career
- Allegiance: Abbasid Caliphate
- Service years: 749–810s
- Wars: Abbasid Revolution, campaigns in Arminiya, Arab–Khazar Wars, Fourth Fitna

Khuzayma ibn Khazim ibn Khuzayma al-Tamimi (Arabic: خزيمة بن خازم بن خزيمة التميمي) (died 818/9) was a powerful grandee in the early Abbasid Caliphate. The son of the distinguished military leader Khazim ibn Khuzayma, he inherited a position of privilege and power, and served early on in high state offices. He was crucial in securing the accession of Harun al-Rashid in 786, and was an influential figure throughout his reign. During the civil war of 811–813 he sided with al-Amin, but finally defected to the camp of al-Amin's brother al-Ma'mun and played a decisive role in ending the year-long siege of Baghdad in a victory for al-Ma'mun's forces.

== Biography ==
Khuzayma was the son of Khazim ibn Khuzayma, a Khurasani Arab who became an early follower of the Abbasids and played an instrumental role in their rise to power both during and after the Abbasid Revolution. Through Khazim, the family achieved a prominent place among the Khurasaniyya, the Khurasani soldiers who had come west during the Revolution and formed the main power-base of the early Abbasid regime. In his youth, Khuzayma participated in the Revolution alongside his father, and according to al-Dinawari was named governor of Tabaristan in 760. After Khazim's death (the date is unknown, but sometime after 765), his position and influence were mostly inherited by Khuzayma. Khuzayma served as sahib al-shurta (chief of police) of Baghdad under Caliph al-Mahdi (r. 775–785).

His power was shown in 786, at the death of al-Hadi (r. 785–786), when he was instrumental in securing the accession of al-Hadi's younger brother Harun al-Rashid (r. 786–809) against the claims of al-Hadi's son Ja'far. At the time of his sudden death on 14 September, al-Hadi was planning to remove Harun from the succession in favour of Ja'far, but he had not yet done so. Thus, on the night when al-Hadi died, Harun's supporters hastened to acclaim him as Caliph, while others gave the oath of allegiance to Ja'far. Although Khuzayma had been a staunch supporter of al-Hadi, the Caliph's decision to strip his brother Abdallah from the post of sahib al-shurta probably alienated him. Khuzayma reportedly gathered and armed 5,000 of his own followers, dragged the young prince from his bed and forced him to publicly renounce his claims in favour of Harun.

Both Khuzayma and his brother Abdallah enjoyed great influence and occupied senior provincial governorships under Harun; Khuzayma's wealth was such that he built a magnificent palace in Baghdad. Khuzayma served as governor of Basra, as well as twice as governor (ostikan) of Arminiya (a large province encompassing the whole of Transcaucasia) the first time for 14 months in 786–787, and again for an unknown period of time around 804. According to Arab sources, his first tenure was distinguished for his sound government, but according to Armenian sources he launched repeated and bloody persecutions of the semi-autonomous local princes in both Armenia and Iberia, executing many of their number (among them Archil of Kakheti). After the 799 Khazar invasion of Arminiya, Khuzayma and Yazid ibn Mazyad were tasked with confronting the Khazars. Yazid led the troops against the Khazar invaders, while Khuzayma remained in reserve near Nisibis. In 808, when Harun journeyed east to deal with the revolt of Rafi ibn al-Layth in Khurasan, Khuzayma was appointed as the guardian and tutor over Harun's third son, al-Qasim, who was governor of the frontier zone with the Byzantine Empire. Towards the end of Harun's reign, he also served as the Caliph's shahib al-shurta.

After the death of Harun and the rise to the throne of al-Amin (r. 809–813), Khuzayma was appointed as Qasim's deputy for the Jazira, and in 810, when Qasim was recalled to Baghdad and placed under virtual house arrest, Khuzayma succeeded him as governor of both the Jazira and the Byzantine frontier. In the period leading up to the civil war between al-Amin and his half-brother al-Ma'mun (r. 813–833), at the time heir-apparent and governor of Khurasan, Khuzayma was among those who advised al-Amin to avoid openly breaking relations with al-Ma'mun by removing him from the line of succession. By this time, Khuzayma was in very advanced age and almost blind. Like most of the Khurasaniyya and the traditional Abbasid elites, he and his brothers initially supported al-Amin, who was based at Baghdad, against al-Ma'mun, who was based in Khurasan. After the victories of al-Ma'mun's troops, however, Baghdad itself came under a year-long siege. As the siege progressed, the elites' support for al-Amin began to waver, and in September 813, Khuzayma was contacted by al-Ma'mun's general, Tahir ibn Husayn. The talks bore fruit, and on the night of 21 September, Khuzayma's servants cut the main bridge over the Tigris linking the eastern and western quarters of Baghdad. The eastern part surrendered the very next day, while Tahir's troops stormed and captured most of the western city, resulting in al-Amin's flight, capture and execution by Tahir's men. Khuzayma remained an important personage and was involved in the tumultuous politics of Baghdad during the next few years, being one of the leaders of the uprising of Baghdad against al-Ma'mun's governor, al-Hasan ibn Sahl, in 816. He died in 818/9. After his death, and with the end of the civil war and the rise of new elites under al-Ma'mun, his family, like most of the Khurasaniyya, lost its previous power.

== Sources ==
- Bosworth, C. E., ed. (1987). The History of al-Ṭabarī, Volume XXXII: The Reunification of the ʿAbbāsid Caliphate: The Caliphate of al-Maʾmūn, A.D. 813–33/A.H. 198–213. SUNY Series in Near Eastern Studies. Albany, New York: State University of New York Press. ISBN 978-0-88706-058-8.
- Bosworth, C. E., ed. (1989). The History of al-Ṭabarī, Volume XXX: The ʿAbbāsid Caliphate in Equilibrium: The Caliphates of Mūsā al-Hādī and Hārūn al-Rashīd, A.D. 785–809/A.H. 169–192. SUNY Series in Near Eastern Studies. Albany, New York: State University of New York Press. ISBN 978-0-88706-564-4.
- Crone, Patricia (1980). Slaves on Horses: The Evolution of the Islamic Polity (1980 ed.). Cambridge: Cambridge University Press. ISBN 978-0521229616.
- Gibb, H.A.R. (1995). The Travels of Ibn Baṭṭūṭa,, A.D. 1325–1354. The Erskine Press. ISBN 9781852970420.
- Fishbein, Michael, ed. (1992). The History of al-Ṭabarī, Volume XXXI: The War Between Brothers: The Caliphate of Muḥammad al-Amīn, A.D. 809–813/A.H. 193–198. SUNY Series in Near Eastern Studies. Albany, New York: State University of New York Press. ISBN 978-0-7914-1085-1.
- Kennedy, Hugh N. (1986). The Early Abbasid Caliphate: A Political History. London and Sydney: Croom Helm. ISBN 0-7099-3115-8.
- Kennedy, Hugh (2001). The Armies of the Caliphs: Military and Society in the Early Islamic State. London and New York: Routledge. ISBN 0-415-25093-5.
- Laurent, Joseph (1919). L'Arménie entre Byzance et l'Islam, depuis la conquête arabe jusqu'en 886 (in French). Paris: Fontemoing et Cie.
