= Kazeem =

Kazeem may refer to:

- Carol Kazeem, American politician
- Kazeem Manzur, British racecar driver
- Karim Kazeem, Nigerian footballer
- Musa al-Kadhim, seventh Shiite Imam

== See also ==
- Khazim
