= Valashabad =

Historical Iraqi city

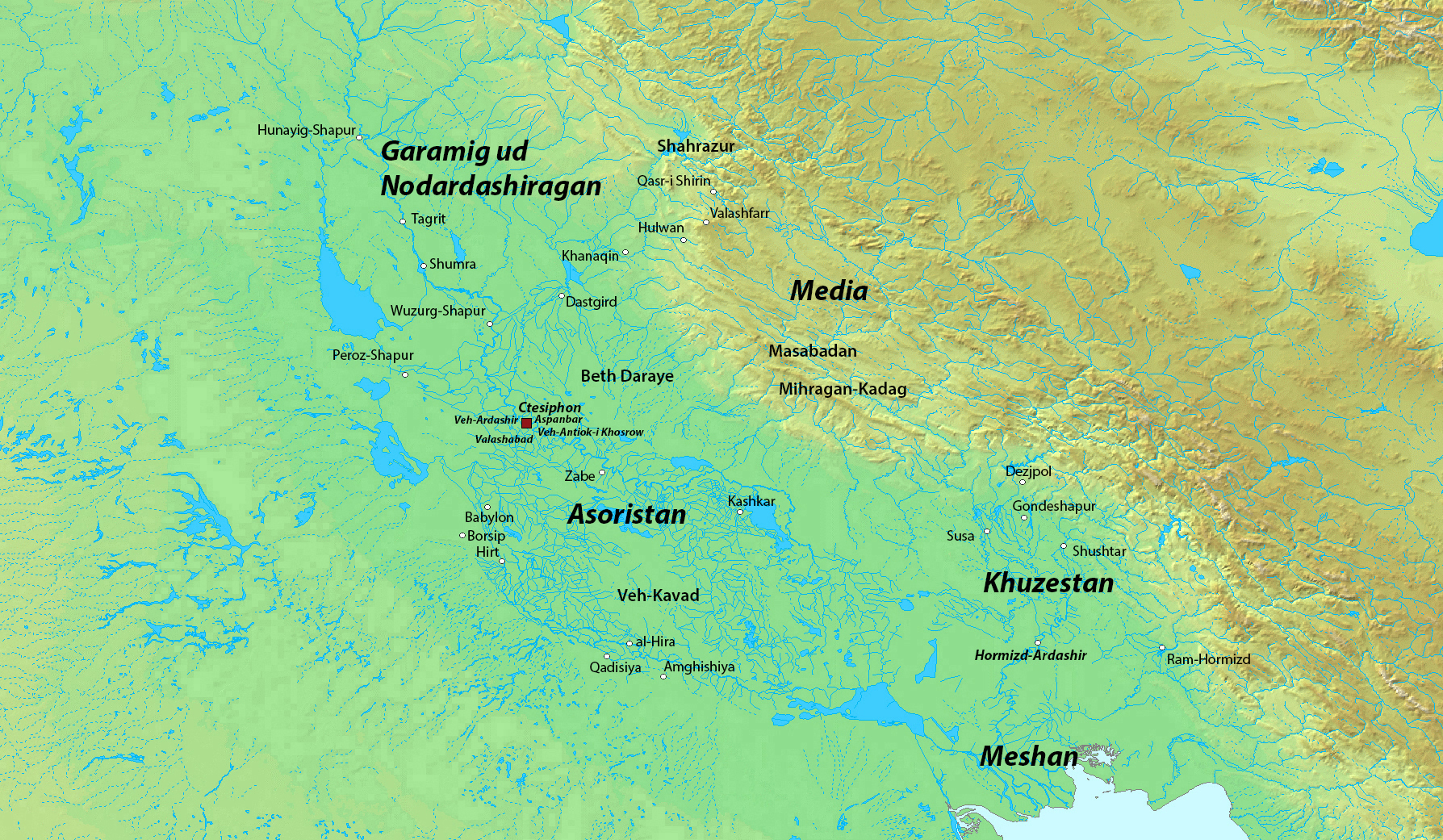
Map of the southwestern part of the Sasanian Empire.

Valashabad (also spelled as Valakhshkert, Valakhshgerd and Valakhshkard), known in Greek sources as Vologesocerta, and in Arabic sources as Sabat (ساباط), was an ancient city in present-day Iraq, and formed a suburb of Ctesiphon, the capital of the Parthian Empire and their successors, the Sasanian Empire.

The city was founded by the Parthian king Vologases I (r. 51-78) and was captured in 226 by the Sasanians. In 636, the city was attacked by Muslim Arabs under the Arab general Khalid ibn Urfuta. At Valashabad stood a force of troops, which the former Sasanian monarch Borandukht saw as an important part of the survival of the Sasanian Empire, were annihilated by the Arabs, who were joined by the former Sasanian general Shirzadh, who aided them in capturing Veh-Ardashir, another suburb of Ctesiphon.

== Sources ==
- Chaumont, M. L. (1988). "BALĀŠ". Encyclopaedia Iranica, Vol. III, Fasc. 6. pp. 574–580.
- Fisher, William Bayne; Yarshater, Ehsan (1983). The Cambridge History of Iran: The Seleucid, Parthian and Sasanian periods. Cambridge University Press. ISBN 978-0-521-24693-4.
- Pourshariati, Parvaneh (2008). Decline and Fall of the Sasanian Empire: The Sasanian-Parthian Confederacy and the Arab Conquest of Iran. London and New York: I.B. Tauris. ISBN 978-1-84511-645-3.
- Kröger, Jens (1993). "CTESIPHON". Encyclopaedia Iranica, Vol. IV, Fasc. 4. pp. 446–448.
- Morony, Michael (2009). "MADĀʾEN". Encyclopaedia Iranica.
- Daryaee, Touraj (2012). The Oxford Handbook of Iranian History. Oxford University Press. pp. 1–432. ISBN 978-0199875757.
