= Rachae =

Rachae or Rachæ was an ancient town near Ctesiphon, in Sittacene, Assyria. Its precise location is not known but it is in the modern-day borders of Iraq.
