= Weh Antiok Khosrow =

Ancient Iraqi city

Wēh Antīōk Khosrow (Middle Persian: wyḥ ʾntywk ḥwslwd; "Khosrow's Better Antioch", literally, "better than Antioch, Khosrow [built this]"), also called Beh-az-Andīw-e Khosrow (New Persian: به از اندیو خسرو, literally "Better-than-Antioch of Khosrow"), Antiocheia Chosroou (Greek: Ἀντιόχεια Χοσρόου), Rūmagān (Persian: رومگان), or al-Rūmīya (Arabic: الرومية), was a historic city in modern day Iraq. It was founded by Iranian shah Khosrow I on the east bank of the Tigris in the vicinity of Ctesiphon, Sasanian Empire, that was populated by deported Roman prisoners-of-war. It was reportedly about one day's walk from Ctesiphon.

Antioch had previously been devastated by an earthquake in 526. The Roman Emperor Justin and his heir and Caesar Justinian had sent substantial resources to the city to rebuild it.

The Persians used deportation as a tool of policy. Khosrow I captured Antioch in 540 during the Byzantine–Sasanian wars; the city was destroyed and its population was deported to this new city. According to Jacob of Edessa, prisoners-of-war from the cities of Sura, Beroea, Antioch, Apamea, Callinicum, and Batnai in Osrhoene were deported to this new city. It may be identical with Māhōzē Ḥəḏattā (literally "the New City") in the Syriac conciliar acts.

Procopius has provided detailed information on the building of the city, though his primary source is pro-Sasanian. According to al-Tabari and al-Tha'alibi, the city was built on the plan of the Syrian metropolis and Khosrow I did everything in his power to make the residents want to stay. He provided Weh Antiok Khosrow with Roman baths and a circus. He also settled charioteers in the city.

The city was governed by Barāz, a Christian from Gundeshapur. By the late 6th century, it had a population of circa 30,000.

The city was captured by the Arab Muslims under Khalid ibn Urfuta. Later in the Abbasid period, Caliph Al-Mansur used the city, then known as al Rumiyyah as seat of government for a few months.

== See also ==
- Weh Antiok Shapur
- Weh Amid Kawad
- Siege of Antioch (540)

== Sources ==
- Canepa, Matthew P. (2009). The Two Eyes of the Earth: Art and Ritual of Kingship Between Rome and Sasanian Iran. University of California Press. ISBN 978-0520257276.
- Canepa, Matthew (2018). "Weh-andīōg-husraw (Rūmagān)". In Nicholson, Oliver (ed.). The Oxford Dictionary of Late Antiquity. Oxford: Oxford University Press. ISBN 978-0-19-866277-8.
- Sauer, Eberhard (2017). Sasanian Persia: Between Rome and the Steppes of Eurasia. London and New York: Edinburgh University Press. pp. 1–336. ISBN 9781474401029.
