= Khalid ibn Urfuta =

7th-century Arab Muslim military commander

Khalid ibn Urfuta (Arabic: خالد بن عرفطة) was a military leader in the early Islamic conquest of Persia. He captured Valashabad, Weh Antiok Khusrau (al-Rumiyya), and Veh-Ardashir for the Rashidun Caliphate.
