= Abdallah ibn Khazim al-Tamimi =

Late 8th/early 9th century Abbasid official

Abdallah ibn Khazim
- Occupation: Senior official in the Abbasid Caliphate
- Years active: 780–812 CE
- Known for: Chief of security for al-Mahdi and al-Hadi; Governor of Tabaristan
- Parent: Khazim ibn Khuzayma al-Tamimi (father)

Abdallah ibn Khazim (Arabic: عبدالله بن خازم) (fl. 780–812) was a son of the famed Khurasani Arab general Khazim ibn Khuzayma al-Tamimi and a senior official in the Abbasid Caliphate.

Khuzayma was the son of Khazim ibn Khuzayma, a Khurasani Arab who became an early follower of the Abbasids and played an instrumental rule in their rise to power both during and after the Abbasid Revolution. Through Khazim, the family achieved a prominent place among the Khurasaniyya, the Khurasani soldiers who had come west during the Revolution and formed the main power-base of the early Abbasid regime. Abdallah served as chief of security (sahib al-shurta) for the Caliph al-Mahdi (r. 775–785) in 781 CE, for al-Mahdi's son and heir-apparent al-Hadi (r. 785–786) during his campaign in Jurjan. Caliph Harun al-Rashid (r. 786–809) appointed him governor of Tabaristan on the Caspian Sea. In the civil war that broke out after Harun's death between al-Amin (r. 809–813) and al-Ma'mun (r. 813–833), he, along with his brothers, sided with al-Amin, and even served as his sahib al-shurta towards the end of his reign. As al-Ma'mun's forces laid siege to Baghdad in 812, he and his family abandoned the city and fled to nearby Mada'in.

== Sources ==
- Crone, Patricia (1980). Slaves on Horses: The Evolution of the Islamic Polity. Cambridge: Cambridge University Press. ISBN 0-521-52940-9.
- Kennedy, Hugh (2001). The Armies of the Caliphs: Military and Society in the Early Islamic State. London and New York: Routledge. ISBN 0-415-25093-5.
