= Khazim ibn Khuzayma al-Tamimi =

Abbasid official and Military leader

- Born: Marw al-Rudh
- Died: after 768
- Relatives: Khuzayma, Shu'ayb, Abdallah, Ibrahim (sons)
- Military career
- Allegiance: Abbasid Caliphate
- Service years: 749–768
- Wars: Abbasid Revolution; Alid Revolt (762–763); Abbasid Conquest of Tabaristan; Ustadh sis Rebellion; Tabaristan Rebellion (759)

Khazim ibn Khuzayma al-Tamimi (Arabic: خازم بن خزيمة التميمي) (fl. 749–768) was a Khurasani Arab military leader. One of the early supporters of the Abbasid da'wa in Khurasan, he played a major role in the Abbasid Revolution against the Umayyads, and then spent the next two decades suppressing revolts across the Caliphate. As one of the main figures of the Khurasaniyya, the main power base of the Abbasid regime, he cemented his family in a position of power and influence: his sons would play an important role in the affairs of the Caliphate over the next decades.

== Biography ==
His family hailed from the Nahshal branch of the Banu Tamim, which had settled at Marw al-Rudh in Khurasan, probably during the early days of the Muslim conquest of the region. The family had apparently become Persianized to some extent; Khazim is recorded as preferring to use Persian to address his followers, and his sister had married an Iranian. Khazim was one of the earliest supporters of the Abbasid missionary cause (da'wa) in Khurasan; he secured his native city for the Abbasids in the early days of the Abbasid Revolution, and then commanded the city's contingent in the Abbasid army that marched west to topple the Umayyads in 749–750. He participated in the Siege of Wasit in 750, and in 751–752 he was dispatched to Oman to suppress the local Kharijites. He returned north in 755–756 to fight against another Kharijite uprising in the Jazira and against the rebellion of the Abbasid Abdallah ibn Ali in Syria.

In 758–759 he accompanied the Caliph's son and future Caliph, al-Mahdi (reigned 775–785) to Khurasan, where the local governor, Abd al-Jabbar al-Azdi, had launched a revolt. Khazim was tasked with suppressing the rebellion, but the people of Marw al-Rudh, upon hearing of his appointment, rose up against the rebellious governor, defeated and captured him, and handed him over to Khazim. In the same period he also campaigned against the ispahbadh Khurshid, the Persian ruler of Tabaristan.

With the exception of a swift expedition west to retake Ahwaz during the Alid revolt of 762–763, he seems to have remained in Khurasan, where he also faced and defeated the rebellion of Ustadhsis in 768. Nothing more is known of him thereafter, and it is assumed that he died there. Unlike his sons, Khazim does not appear to have held any provincial governorships.

== Assessment ==
Khazim was one of the leading military commanders of the early Khurasaniyya, the Khurasani Arab army that brought and then maintained the Abbasids to power. Indeed, as the Islamic scholar Hugh N. Kennedy remarks, "after the death of Qahtaba b. Shabib, he was probably the most successful commander of the first generation of the Khurasaniyya". According to Kennedy, he was a cautious general, but also capable of "quick and surprising decisions" during battle, his favourite tactic being to detach a part of his army to attack the enemy from the rear. He also displayed a sophistication, rare for the time, in his use of "exotic" weapons, e.g. petrol-soaked torches against the Omanis and caltrops against the Kharijite cavalry.

== Family ==
His sons, Abdallah, Ibrahim, Shu'ayb and especially Khuzayma, remained prominent in the Abbasid court after his death, and played a major role in the reign of Harun al-Rashid (r. 786–809). Like most of the original Khurasaniyya families, however, his descendants lost their privileged position during the civil war that followed Harun's death.

== Sources ==
- Crone, Patricia (1980). Slaves on horses: the evolution of the Islamic polity. Cambridge and New York: Cambridge University Press. ISBN 0-521-52940-9.
- Kennedy, Hugh N. (2001). The Armies of the Caliphs: Military and Society in the Early Islamic State. London and New York: Routledge. ISBN 0-415-25093-5.
