= White Palace (Ctesiphon) =

Map of the metropolis of Ctesiphon in the Sasanian era. The White Palace was located in the Madina al-Atiqa section on the eastern bank

The White Palace was the main residence of the Sasanian King of Kings in the capital of Ctesiphon (about 35 kilometres (22 mi) southeast of Baghdad), most likely founded by the second Sasanian monarch Shapur I (r. 240–270).

According to the 9th-century Muslim geographer Ya'qubi, the palace was located on the east bank of the Tigris River, in a district known in Arabic sources as al-madina al-ʿatiqa ("the Old City"). In later Islamic-era sources, the White Palace is often confused with the Ayvan-e Kesra. However, early Muslim writers such as al-Tabari and Ya'qubi, who both drew their work from primary sources, differentiate between the two palaces. In reality, the Ayvan-e Kesra was a 6th-century construction located in Aspanbar, a section south of the White Palace. It was an open building, preferred for public audiences, banquets, and welcoming foreign emissaries, in contrast to the White Palace, which was well-fortified and easy to protect.

The White Palace was occupied and pillaged during the Arab conquest of Iran. In 755, the Abbasid caliph al-Mansur (r. 754–775) started the demolition of the palace in order to build his new capital, Baghdad. While he later ordered the palace to be restored, it remained in decay. It was finally demolished in 903 by the Abbasid caliph al-Muqtafi (r. 902–908), who used its remnants to finish the construction of the Taj Palace in Baghdad.

== Sources ==
- Canepa, Matthew P. (2018). "The Palace of the Lord of the Sevenfold World". The Iranian Expanse: Transforming Royal Identity through Architecture, Landscape, and the Built Environment, 550 BCE–642 CE. University of California Press. pp. 324–344. ISBN 9780520964365.
- Keall, E. J. (1987). "Ayvān-e Kesrā". In Yarshater, Ehsan (ed.). Encyclopædia Iranica. Vol. III/2: Awāʾel al-maqālāt–Azerbaijan IV. London and New York: Routledge & Kegan Paul. pp. 155–159. ISBN 978-0-71009-114-7.
- Morony, Michael (2009). "Madāʾen". In Yarshater, Ehsan (ed.). Encyclopædia Iranica (Online ed.). Encyclopædia Iranica Foundation.
