= Shu'ayb ibn Khazim =

Abbasid Governor of Damascus

Shu'ayb ibn Khazim شعيب بن خازم

Governor of Damascus
- In office 802–803
- Monarch: Harun al-Rashid
- Preceded by: Ishaq ibn Isa ibn Ali
- Succeeded by: Ja'far ibn Yahya

Personal details
- Died: Abbasid Caliphate
- Parent: Khazim ibn Khuzayma al-Tamimi

Shu'ayb ibn Khazim (Arabic: شعيب بن خازم) was a son of the famed Khurasani Arab general Khazim ibn Khuzayma al-Tamimi, and served as governor of Damascus under Caliph Harun al-Rashid (r. 786–809).

== Sources ==
- Crone, Patricia (1980). Slaves on Horses: The Evolution of the Islamic Polity. Cambridge: Cambridge University Press. pp. 180–181. ISBN 0-521-52940-9.
