= Veh-Ardashir =

Ancient Sasanian city

- Beh-Ardashir, Weh-Ardashir
- Archeological map of Seleucia and Ctesiphon sites

- Location within Iraq
- 33°5′54″N 44°33′15″E
- Type: Settlement
- Cultures: Sasanian
- Location: Baghdad Governorate, Iraq
- Region: Mesopotamia

History
- Built: 230 AD
- Built by: Ardashir I

Map of the southwestern Sasanian province of Asoristan and its surroundings

Veh-Ardashir (also spelled as Beh-Ardashir and Weh-Ardashir), was an ancient Sasanian city in present-day Iraq, and formed a suburb of their capital, Ctesiphon.

== History ==
Originally known as Seleucia, the city was rebuilt and renamed in 230 by the founder of the Sasanian Empire, king Ardashir I (r. 224-240). The city was known as Mahoza by the Jews, Kokhe (Syriac) by the Christians, and Behrasir by the Arabs. Veh-Ardashir was populated by many wealthy Jews, and was the seat of the Patriarch of the Church of the East.

In the Talmud, it is written as Ardashir, located across the Tigris from the city of Ctesiphon.

The city was walled and was circular by design.

A governor marzban (general of a frontier province, "margrave") is known to have resided in a fortress in the northern part of this city in ca. 420. During the mid-5th century, a flooding occurred in Veh-Ardashir, which divided the city in two. This resulted in a decline of the city, and the abandonment of many parts of the city. During the reign of king Khosrow II (590-628), a palace was constructed near a garden named Bagh-i Hinduvan (meaning "the garden of the Indians"). In 636, Veh-Ardashir was captured by the Arab general Khalid ibn Urfuta during the Muslim conquest of Persia.

== Sources ==
- Fisher, William Bayne; Yarshater, Ehsan (1983). The Cambridge History of Iran: The Seleucid, Parthian and Sasanian periods. Cambridge University Press. ISBN 978-0-521-24693-4.
- Pourshariati, Parvaneh (2008). Decline and Fall of the Sasanian Empire: The Sasanian-Parthian Confederacy and the Arab Conquest of Iran. London and New York: I.B. Tauris. ISBN 978-1-84511-645-3.
- Howard-Johnston, James (2010). "ḴOSROW II". Encyclopaedia Iranica, Online Edition.
- Kröger, Jens (1993). "CTESIPHON". Encyclopaedia Iranica, Vol. IV, Fasc. 4. pp. 446–448.
- Morony, Michael (2009). "MADĀʾEN". Encyclopaedia Iranica.
- Morony, Michael (1989). "BEH-ARDAŠĪR". Encyclopaedia Iranica, Vol. IV, Fasc. 1. pp. 93–94.
- Pots, Daniel; Canepa, Matthew (2018). "Kokhe". In Nicholson, Oliver (ed.). The Oxford Dictionary of Late Antiquity. Oxford: Oxford University Press. ISBN 978-0-19-866277-8.
