= Exarchate =

List of exarchates, both political and ecclesiastical

This list of exarchates contains an overview of administrative jurisdictions, either political or ecclesiastical, that are headed by an exarch. The list includes both historical and modern exarchates.

== Political exarchates ==
=== Roman Empire ===
- Roman imperial dioceses (headed by vicars, who were also called exarchs)

=== Byzantine Empire ===
- Exarchate of Africa
- Exarchate of Ravenna (or Exarchate of Italy)

== Ecclesiastical exarchates ==
=== Catholicism ===
Apostolic exarchates of the Byzantine Rite

- Greek Byzantine Catholic Church:
  - Greek Catholic Apostolic Exarchate of Greece
  - Greek Catholic Apostolic Exarchate of Istanbul
- Melkite (Greek) Catholic Church:
  - Melkite Catholic Apostolic Exarchate of Argentina
  - Melkite Catholic Apostolic Exarchate of Venezuela
- Russian Greek Catholic Church:
  - Russian Catholic Apostolic Exarchate of Harbin
  - Russian Catholic Apostolic Exarchate of Russia
- Ruthenian Greek Catholic Church:
  - Apostolic Exarchate of the Greek Catholic Church in the Czech Republic
  - Exarchate of Saints Cyril and Methodius of Toronto
- Ukrainian Greek Catholic Church:
  - Ukrainian Catholic Apostolic Exarchate of Germany and Scandinavia
  - Ukrainian Catholic Apostolic Exarchate of Italy

Apostolic exarchates of the Antiochian Rite

- Maronite Church:
  - Maronite Catholic Apostolic Exarchate of Colombia
- Syriac (Syrian) Catholic Church :
  - Syriac Catholic Apostolic Exarchate of Canada
  - Syriac Catholic Apostolic Exarchate of Venezuela

Apostolic exarchates of the Armenian Rite

- Armenian Catholic Church:
  - Armenian Catholic Apostolic Exarchate of Latin America and Mexico

==== Patriarchal exarchates ====
Patriarchal exarchates of the Armenian Rite

- Armenian Catholic Church:
  - Armenian Catholic Patriarchal Exarchate of Damascus
  - Armenian Catholic Patriarchal Exarchate of Jerusalem and Amman

Patriarchal exarchates of the Byzantine Rite

- Melkite (Greek) Catholic Church:
  - Melkite Catholic Patriarchal Exarchate of Iraq
  - Melkite Catholic Patriarchal Exarchate of Istanbul
  - Melkite Catholic Patriarchal Exarchate of Kuwait

Patriarchal exarchates of the Antiochian Rite

- Maronite Church:
  - Maronite Catholic Patriarchal Exarchate of Jerusalem and Palestine
  - Maronite Catholic Patriarchal Exarchate of Jordan
- Syriac (Syrian) Catholic Church:
  - Syriac Catholic Patriarchal Exarchate of Bassorah and the Gulf
  - Syriac Catholic Patriarchal Exarchate of Jerusalem
  - Syriac Catholic Patriarchal Exarchate of Turkey

==== Archiepiscopal exarchates ====
Archiepiscopal exarchates of the Byzantine Rite

- Ukrainian (Greek) Catholic Church
  - Ukrainian Catholic Archiepiscopal Exarchate of Donetsk
  - Ukrainian Catholic Archiepiscopal Exarchate of Kharkiv
  - Ukrainian Catholic Archiepiscopal Exarchate of Lutsk
  - Ukrainian Catholic Archiepiscopal Exarchate of Odesa
  - Ukrainian Catholic Archiepiscopal Exarchate of Krym

==== Former Eastern Catholic exarchates ====
===== Former Eastern Catholic exarchates in the Old World =====
in Europe – Byzantine Rite

- Bulgarian Catholic Apostolic Exarchate of Sofia
- Greek Catholic Apostolic Exarchate of Turkey of Europe
- Hungarian Catholic Apostolic Exarchate of Miskolc
- Apostolic Exarchate of Łemkowszczyzna
- Ukrainian Catholic Apostolic Exarchate of Belarus
- Ukrainian Catholic Archiepiscopal Exarchate of Donetsk-Kharkiv
- Ukrainian Catholic Archiepiscopal Exarchate of Lutsk-Volyn
- Ukrainian Catholic Archiepiscopal Exarchate of Odesa-Crimea
- Apostolic Exarchate of Serbia and Montenegro (2003–2013)
- Byzantine Catholic Apostolic Exarchate of Serbia
- Apostolic Exarchate of Macedonia

in Asia – Armenian Rite

- Armenian Catholic Patriarchal Exarchate of Jerusalem
- Armenian Catholic Patriarchal Exarchate of Syria

in Asia – Antiochian Rite

- Syrian Catholic Patriarchal Exarchate of Lebanon
- Syro-Malankara Catholic Exarchate in the United States

in Asia – Syro-Oriental Rite

- Syro-Malabar Apostolic Exarchate of Chanda

in Africa – Alexandrian Rite

- Apostolic Exarchate of Addis Abbeba
- Apostolic Exarchate of Asmara

in Africa – Antiochian Rite

- Maronite Catholic Apostolic Exarchate of Western and Central Africa

===== Former Eastern Catholic exarchates in the New World =====
in the Americas – Antiochian Rite

- Maronite Catholic Apostolic Exarchate of the USA

in the Americas – Armenian Rite

- Armenian Catholic Apostolic Exarchate of Latin America and Mexico
- Armenian Catholic Apostolic Exarchate of the USA and Canada

in the Americas – Byzantine Rite

- Romanian Catholic Apostolic Exarchate of the USA
- Ruthenian Catholic Apostolic Exarchate of the USA
- Melkite Catholic Apostolic Exarchate of the USA
- Ukrainian Catholic Apostolic Exarchate of Canada
- Ukrainian Catholic Apostolic Exarchate of Central Canada
- Ukrainian Catholic Apostolic Exarchate of Eastern Canada
- Ukrainian Catholic Apostolic Exarchate of Edmonton
- Ukrainian Catholic Apostolic Exarchate of Manitoba
- Ukrainian Catholic Apostolic Exarchate of Saskatoon
- Ukrainian Catholic Apostolic Exarchate of Stamford
- Ukrainian Catholic Apostolic Exarchate of Toronto
- Ukrainian Catholic Apostolic Exarchate of the USA
- Ukrainian Catholic Apostolic Exarchate of Western Canada

in the Americas – Syro-Oriental Rite

- Chaldean Catholic Apostolic Exarchate of the USA
- Syro-Malabar Catholic Church:
  - Syro-Malabar Catholic Apostolic Exarchate of Canada

=== Eastern Orthodoxy ===
==== Exarchates of the Ecumenical Patriarchate of Constantinople ====
Former

- Exarchate of Metsovo
- Russian Orthodox Exarchate of Western Europe

Current

- Exarchate of the Philippines
- Exarchate of Lithuania

==== Exarchates of the Russian Orthodox Church ====
- Belarusian Exarchate
- Ukrainian Exarchate of the Russian Orthodox Church
- Russian Exarchate of North America (historical)
- Patriarchal Exarchate in Western Europe
- Patriarchal Exarchate in South-East Asia
- Patriarchal Exarchate of Africa

==== Exarchates of other Eastern Orthodox jurisdictions ====
- Bulgarian Exarchate
- Mexican Exarchate of the Orthodox Church in America

== See also ==
- Exarch
- Eparch
- Eparchy
- Vicariate
- Vicariate (Eastern Orthodoxy)

== Sources ==
- Gelichi, Sauro (2021). "The Venetiae, the Exarchate and the Pentapolis". A Companion to Byzantine Italy. Boston-Leiden: Brill. pp. 360–386. ISBN 978-90-04-30770-4.
- Radojević, Mira; Mićić, Srđan B. (2015). "Serbian Orthodox Church Cooperation and Frictions with Ecumenical Patriarchate of Constantinople and Bulgarian Exarchate During Interwar Period". Studia academica šumenesia. 2: 126–143.
- Shlosser, Franziska E. (2003). "The Exarchates of Africa and Italy". Jahrbuch der Österreichischen Byzantinistik. 53: 27–45. Archived from the original on 19 June 2025.
