= Antoine Nassif =

His Excellency Antoine Nassif
- Syriac Catholic Apostolic Exarch of Canada
- Church: Syriac Catholic Church
- Diocese: Syriac Catholic Apostolic Exarchate for Canada
- Appointed: January 3, 2016
- Previous post: Rector of the Patriarchal Seminary

Orders
- Ordination: July 26, 1992 by Ignatius Antony II Hayyek
- Consecration: January 23, 2016 by Ignatius Joseph III Yonan
- Rank: Apostolic Exarch

Personal details
- Born: February 12, 1969 (age 57) Beirut, Lebanon
- Denomination: Syriac Catholicism

Paul Antoine Nassif (born February 21, 1969, in Beirut, Lebanon) is the current Syriac Catholic Exarch of Canada.

== Life ==
Antoine Nassif received on 26 July 1992 by the Syriac Catholic Patriarch of Antioch, Ignatius Antony II Hayyek, the sacrament of Holy orders.

On January 7, 2016 Pope Francis appointed him titular bishop of Serigene and ordered him the first Syriac Catholic Exarch of Canada. The Syriac Catholic Patriarch of Antioch, Ignatius Joseph III Yonan, on 23 January of the same year, gave him his episcopal consecration; his co-consecrators were the Emeritus Curial Archbishop in the Syriac Catholic Patriarchate of Antioch, Denys Raboula Antoine Beylouni, and the bishop of the Eparchy of Our Lady of Deliverance of Newark, Yousif Benham Habash.
