= Timoteo Hikmat Beylouni =

Syriac Catholic bishop in Venezuela (1945–2026)

Most Reverend Timoteo Hikmat Beylouni
- Apostolic Exarch of Venezuela for the Syriac Catholics
- Church: Syriac Catholic Church
- Diocese: Apostolic Exarchate of Venezuela
- Installed: 1 March 2011
- Term ended: 30 July 2026
- Predecessor: Iwannis Louis Awad
- Successor: Vacant
- Other post: Titular Bishop of Sabrata (2011–2026)
- Previous post: Protosyncellus of the Syriac Catholic Apostolic Exarchate of Venezuela (2006–2011)

Orders
- Ordination: 26 November 1972
- Consecration: 22 May 2011 by Ignatius Joseph III Yonan

Personal details
- Born: Hikmat Beylouni; 18 November 1945 Aleppo, First Syrian Republic
- Died: 30 July 2026 (aged 80) Caracas, Venezuela
- Denomination: Syriac Catholic
- Education: Charfet Seminary, Holy Spirit University of Kaslik

Timoteo Hikmat Beylouni (Arabic: تيموثاوس حكمت بيلوني; 18 November 1945 – 30 July 2026) was a Syrian-born Venezuelan Syriac Catholic hierarch, who served as the Apostolic Exarch of Venezuela for the Syriac Catholics from 2011 until his death in 2026.

== Early life and ordination ==
Beylouni was born in Aleppo, Syria, on 18 November 1945. He made his primary and secondary education in his hometown before entering the Seminary of Charfet in Lebanon to study philosophy and theology and continuing his education at the Holy Spirit University of Kaslik in Lebanon.

He was ordained a priest for the Syriac Catholic Archeparchy of Aleppo on 26 November 1972. Following his ordination, he served in several pastoral roles within the Archeparchy of Aleppo and in Lebanon, including as a parish priest and as a member of the patriarchal tribunal. In 1990 he was transferred to Venezuela, where served in the different parishes and since 2006 until 2011 he was a Protosyncellus of the Syriac Catholic Apostolic Exarchate of Venezuela. In August 2023, the Exarchate celebrated the 50th anniversary of his priestly ordination with a special Mass of Thanksgiving in Venezuela.

== Episcopal ministry ==
On 1 March 2011, Pope Benedict XVI confirmed his election by the Synod of Bishops of the Syriac Catholic Church as the Apostolic Exarch of Venezuela for the Syriac Catholics, and replaced his predecessor, Iwannis Louis Awad. He was also appointed Titular Bishop of Sabrata.

Beylouni received his episcopal consecration on 22 May 2011 from the Syriac Catholic Patriarch of Antioch, Ignatius Joseph III Yonan, assisted by co-consecrators Denys Antoine Chahda and Raboula Antoine Beylouni.

As Exarch, he was a member of the Episcopal Conference of Venezuela (CEV). His ministry focuses on the spiritual care of the Syriac Catholic diaspora in Venezuela, maintaining their liturgical traditions and Eastern heritage within the predominantly Latin Catholic country.

== Death ==
Beylouni died at the San Bernardino Hospital in Caracas on 30 July 2026, at the age of 80.

Catholic Church titles
Preceded by Iwannis Louis Awad	Apostolic Exarch of Venezuela; 2011–2006	Succeeded by Vacant
Preceded by Sabino Ocan Odoki	Titular Bishop of Sabrata; 2011–2026	Succeeded by Vacant
