= Matthias Mrad =

Lebanese Syriac Catholic bishop (born 1969)

His Excellency Matthias Charles Georges Mrad
- Curial bishop of the Syriac Catholic Patriarchate of Antioch and Titular Bishop of Zorava
- Church: Syriac Catholic Church
- Appointed: 19 February 2018

Orders
- Ordination: 18 July 1993 by Ignace Antoine II Hayek
- Consecration: 14 April 2018 by Ignace Joseph III Younan, Youhanna Battah, Antoine Nassif

Personal details
- Born: Charles Georges Mrad; 15 April 1969 (age 57) Beirut, Lebanon
- Education: Holy Spirit University of Kaslik, Université La Sagesse, Pontifical Lateran University

Matthias Charles Georges Mrad (born 15 April 1969) is a Lebanese Syriac Catholic hierarch, who has served as a Curial bishop of the Syriac Catholic Patriarchate of Antioch and the Titular Bishop of Zorava since 2018.

== Early life and education ==
Charles Mrad was born on 15 April 1969 in Beirut, Lebanon. He entered the Patriarchal Seminary of Charfet and pursued his philosophical and theological studies with a licentiate at the Holy Spirit University of Kaslik and a licentiate in canon law from the Université La Sagesse in Beirut.

He later studied at the Pontifical Lateran University in Rome, where he obtained a doctorate in Canon Law in 2003.

== Priesthood ==
Mrad was ordained to the priesthood on 18 July 1993 for the Patriarchal Archeparchy of Antiochia by Patriarch Ignace Antoine II Hayek.

Following his ordination, he held several pastoral and academic roles, including serving as a judge in the ecclesiastical tribunal and teaching at the university.

== Episcopate ==
On 19 February 2018, the Synod of Bishops of the Syriac Catholic Church elected Mrad as a Curial Bishop of the Syriac Catholic Patriarchate of Antioch. Pope Francis granted his assent to the election on the same day and appointed him the Titular Bishop of Zorava. He was consecrated on 14 April 2018 by Patriarch Ignace Joseph III Younan, with Archbishops Youhanna Battah and Antoine Nassif serving as co-consecrators.

Mrad is an active participant in interfaith dialogue in Lebanon. He has been a prominent figure in the annual Christian–Islamic encounter for peace, marking the Feast of the Annunciation, emphasizing that the Virgin Mary serves as a bridge of unity between the two faiths.

In late 2025, he represented the Syriac Catholic Church in discussions with the Middle East Council of Churches (MECC), highlighting the role of Church media in providing hope and "spiritual food" to the faithful amidst regional crises.
