= Beylouni =

Beylouni is a Syrian surname. Notable people with the surname include:

- Raboula Antoine Beylouni (born 1930), Lebanese Syriac Catholic archbishop
- Timoteo Hikmat Beylouni (1945–2026), Syrian-born Venezuelan Syriac Catholic bishop
