= Vasyl Mastsiukh =

- Apostolic Administrator of Apostolic Administration of Lemkowszczyzna
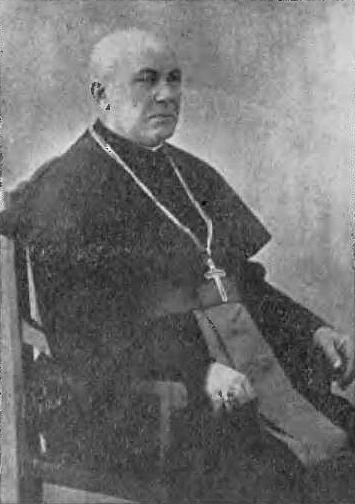
- Church: Ukrainian Greek Catholic Church
- Appointed: 17 November 1934
- Term ended: 12 March 1936
- Predecessor: New Creation
- Successor: Yakiv Medvetskyi

Orders
- Ordination: 12 November 1899 (Priest) by Konstantyn Chekhovych

Personal details
- Born: Vasyl Mastsiukh; 30 March 1873 Nowa Wieś, Austro-Hungarian Empire (present day Nowa Wieś, Nowy Sącz County, Poland)
- Died: 12 March 1936 (aged 62) Rymanów-Zdrój, Second Polish Republic (present day Poland)

Vasyl Mastsiukh (Ukrainian: Василь Масцюх; Polish: Bazyli Maściuch; 30 March 1873 in Nowa Wieś, Austro-Hungarian Empire /present day Nowa Wieś, Nowy Sącz County, Poland/ – 12 March 1936 in Rymanów-Zdrój, Second Polish Republic) was a Greek Catholic hierarch. He served as the first Apostolic Administrator of the new created Apostolic Administration of Lemkowszczyzna from 17 November 1934 until his death on 12 March 1936.

== Life ==
Vasyl Mastsiukh was born in the family of Greek-Catholics in 1873 in the Ukrainian Catholic Eparchy of Przemyśl, Sambir and Sanok. After graduation of the popular school and gymnasium education he joined the Greek-Catholic Theological Seminary in Przemyśl.

He was ordained deacon on 5 November 1899 and priest on 12 November 1899 by Bishop Konstantyn Chekhovych for his native Eparchy, after completed his studies. He continued to study in the University of Lviv and University of Vienna with Doctor of Canon Law degree in 1903. Mastsiukh was a professor of the Canon Law in the Theological Seminary in Przemyśl and in the University of Lviv from 1903 until 1920, with the some interruption, when he was detained in the Thalerhof internment camp during the World War I. Following next fourteen years, from 1920 until 1934, he made a pastoral work for the Greek-Catholic parish in Horożanna Wielka.

On 17 November 1934, Fr. Mastsiukh was appointed by Pope Pius XI the first Apostolic Administrator of the new created Apostolic Administration of Lemkowszczyzna (that later was elevated in the rank of Apostolic Exarchate) without dignity of bishop.

He died unexpectedly at his residence in Rymanów-Zdrój on 12 March 1936 at the age of 62.

Catholic Church titles
New title	Apostolic Administrator of Łemkowszczyzna; 1934–1936	Succeeded by Yakiv Medvetskyi
