= Syriac Catholic Archeparchy of Aleppo =

Syriac Catholic ecclesiastical territory in Syria

Archeparchy of Aleppo Aleppensis Syrorum
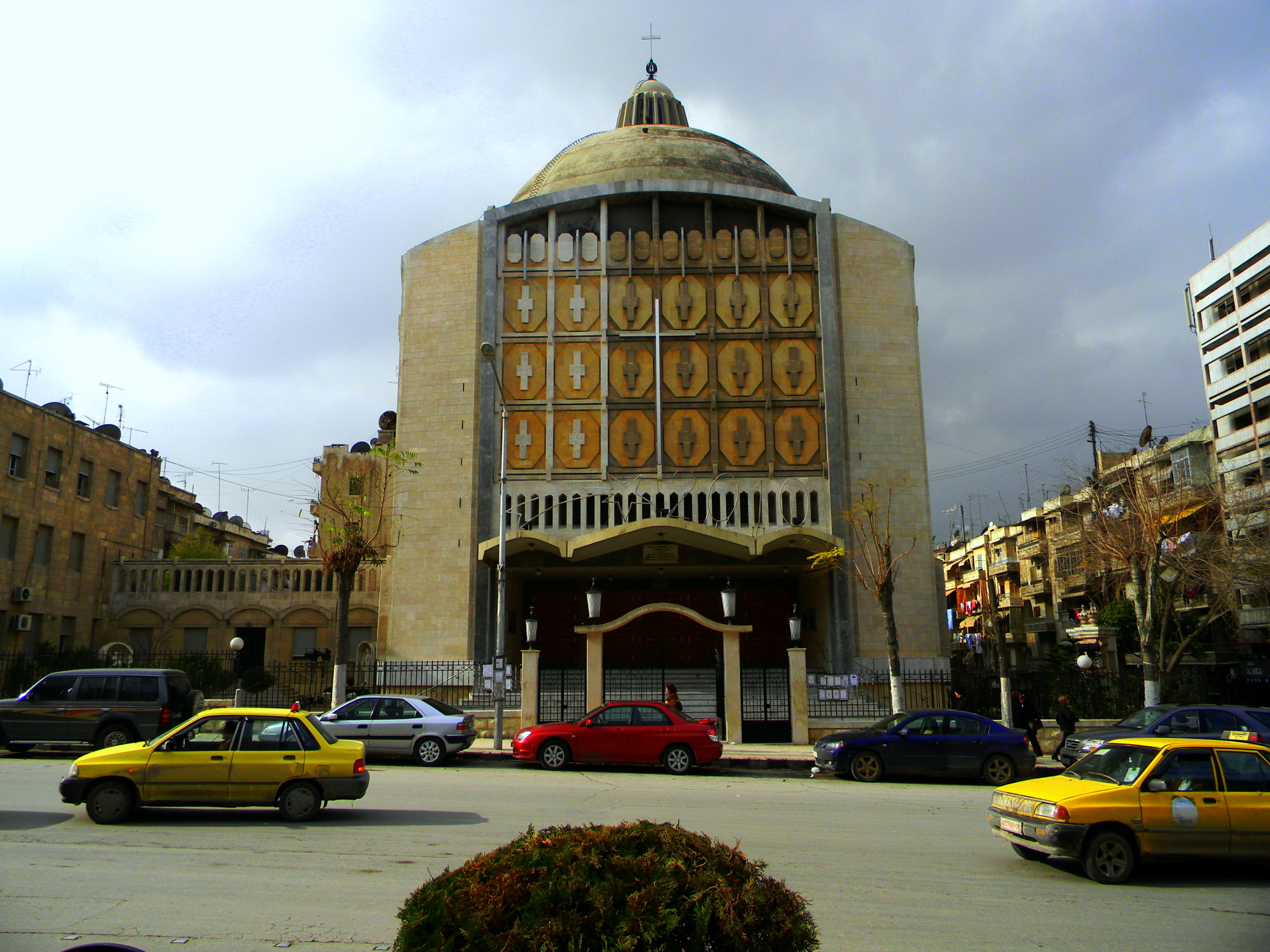
- Cathedral of Our Lady of Assumption, Aleppo

Location
- Country: Syria
- Coordinates: 36°12′39.600″N 37°9′21.499″E

Statistics
- Population: (as of 2023); 9,000
- Parishes: 4

Information
- Denomination: Catholic Church
- Sui iuris church: Syriac Catholic Church
- Rite: West Syriac Rite
- Established: 28 January 1659
- Cathedral: Cathedral of Our Lady of the Assumption, Aleppo
- Secular priests: 4

Current leadership
- Pope: Leo XIV
- Patriarch: Ignatius Joseph III Yonan
- Archeparch: Denys Antoine Chahda

The Syriac Catholic Archeparchy of Aleppo (informally Aleppo of the Syrians) is a Syriac Catholic Church ecclesiastical territory or archeparchy of the Catholic Church in Syria. The Archeparchy of Aleppo is not a metropolitan see and is exemption directly to the Syriac Catholic Patriarch of Antioch.

The seat of the archeparchy is in the Cathedral of Our Lady of the Assumption, in Halab, Syria.

== History ==
Established on 28 January 1659 as Archeparchy of Aleppo, on Syrian territory previously without a Syriac Catholic ordinary or jurisdiction.

== Episcopal ordinaries ==
(incomplete : first centuries unavailable)

Archeparchs of Aleppo

- Denys Michel Hardaya (1817 – 1827)
- Dionysius George Chalhat (1862 – 1874), later Patriarch of Antioch of the Syrians (Lebanon) ([1874] 1874.12.21 – death 1891.12.08) and Eparch (Bishop) of Mardin and Amida of the Syrians (Turkey) (1888.05.01 – death 1891.12.08)
- Efrem Rahmani (1894.05.01 – 1898.10.09), previously Titular Archbishop of Edessa in Osrhoëne of the Syrians (1887.10.02 – 1890.09.20), Eparch (Bishop) of Beirut of the Syrians (Lebanon) (1890.09.20 – 1894.05.01); later Patriarch of Antioch of the Syrians (Lebanon) ([1898.10.09] 1898.11.28 – death 1929.05.07)
- Dionisio Efrem Naccàsché (1903.04.05 – death 1919)
- Teofilo Gabriele Tappouni (Dionisio) (1921.02.24 – 1929.06.24), previously Auxiliary Eparch of Mardin and Amida of the Syrians (Turkey) (1912.09.14 – 1921.02.24) & Titular Bishop of Danabaorum (1912.09.14 – 1913.01.19), Titular Bishop of Bathna of the Syrians (1913.01.19 – 1921.02.24); later Eparch of above Mardin and Amida of the Syrians (Turkey) (1929.06.24 – 1962), Patriarch of Antioch of the Syrians (Lebanon) ([1929.06.24] 1929.07.15 – 1968.01.29), created Cardinal-Priest of Ss. XII Apostoli (1935.12.19 – 1965.02.11), promoted Cardinal-Patriarch (of Antioch of the Syrians) (1965.02.11 – 1968.01.29)
- Dionisio Habib Naassani (1933.03.13 – death 1949.04.29)
- Dionisio Pietro Hindié (1949.08.05 – death 1959.03.05)
- Denys Antoine Hayek (1959.05.27 – 1968.03.10), later Patriarch of Antioch of the Syrians (Lebanon) ([1968.03.10] 1968.03.20 – 1998.07.23), President of Synod of the Syriac Catholic Church (1969 – 1998.07.23)
- Denys Philippe Beilouné (1968.08.19 – death 1990.12.22)
- Raboula Antoine Beylouni (1991.06.01 – 2000.09.16); previously Titular Bishop of Mardin of the Syrians (1983.07.12 – 1991.06.01) & Patriarchal Vicar of Patriarchal Vicariate of Lebanon of the Syrians (Lebanon of the Syrians) (1983.07.12 – 1984), next General Vicar of Antioch of the Syrians (Lebanon) (1984 – 1989); later Bishop of Curia of the Syrians (2000 – 2011.03.01) & again Titular Archbishop of Mardin of the Syrians (2000.09.16 – ...)
- Denys Antoine Chahda (2001.09.13 – ...); previously Apostolic Exarch of Venezuela of the Syrians (Venezuela) (2001.06.28 – 2001.09.13)

== Source and External links ==
- Official Site (in Arabic)
- GCatholic, with incumbent biography links
- Catholic Hierarchy
