= Iwannis Louis Awad =

Syrian Catholic bishop (1934–2020)

- Apostolic Exarch of Venezuela
- Native name: ايوانيس لويس عوض
- Church: Syriac Catholic Church
- See: Apostolic Exarchate of Venezuela
- In office: 17 May 2003 – 1 March 2011
- Predecessor: Denys Antoine Chahda
- Successor: Timoteo Hikmat Beylouni
- Other post: Titular Eparch of Zeugma in Syria (2003-2020)

Orders
- Ordination: 8 December 1957
- Consecration: 12 September 2003 by Ignatius Peter VIII Abdalahad

Personal details
- Born: 17 April 1934 Zaidal, Mandatory Syrian Republic, French Empire
- Died: 18 November 2020 (aged 86) Homs, Homs Governorate, Syrian Arab Republic

Iwannis Louis Awad (17 April 1934 – 18 November 2020) was a Syriac Catholic bishop.

Awad was born in Syria and was ordained to the priesthood in 1957. He served as titular bishop of 'Zeugma in Syria' and as apostolic exarch of the Syriac Catholic Apostolic Exarchate of Venezuela from 2003 to 2011.
