= List of Catholic dioceses in Belarus =

The Roman Catholic Church in Belarus, united in the Episcopal Conference of Belarus, is presently only composed of one Latin ecclesiastical province, comprising the Metropolitan Archdiocese of Minsk-Mohilev and its three suffragan dioceses.

There are no Eastern Catholic dioceses (or eparchies) but there is an apostolic administrator for the Belarusian Greek Catholic Church.

There is an apostolic nunciature to Belarus as papal diplomatic representation (embassy-level) in the national capital Minsk.

== Current Latin Dioceses ==
=== Ecclesiastical Province of Minsk-Mohilev ===
- Metropolitan Archdiocese of Minsk-Mohilev
  - Diocese of Grodno
  - Diocese of Pinsk
  - Diocese of Vitebsk

== Defunct jurisdictions ==
=== Latin defunct jurisdiction ===
- Metropolitan Roman Catholic Archdiocese of Mohilev (1783-1991, merged into Metropolitan Archdiocese of Minsk–Mohilev, losing its Russian territories to establish Apostolic Administration of European Russia and Apostolic Administration of Novosibirsk)

=== Eastern Catholic defunct jurisdictions ===
==== Ruthenian Catholic defunct jurisdictions ====
- Ruthenian Catholic Eparchy of Pinsk–Turaŭ (1596-1795, suppressed)
- Ruthenian Catholic Archeparchy of Polotsk–Vitebsk (1596-1839, suppressed)

==== Ukrainian Catholic defunct jurisdictions ====
- Ukrainian Catholic Eparchy of Volodymyr–Brest (1596-1833, suppressed)
- Ukrainian Catholic Apostolic Exarchate of Belarus (1942-1944, suppressed)

== Sources and external links ==
- GCatholic - here circumscription changes
- Catholic-hierarchy
