= Diocese of Vyatka =

Diocese in Kirov Oblast, Russia

Diocese of Vyatka and Slobodskoy Вятская и Слободская епархия
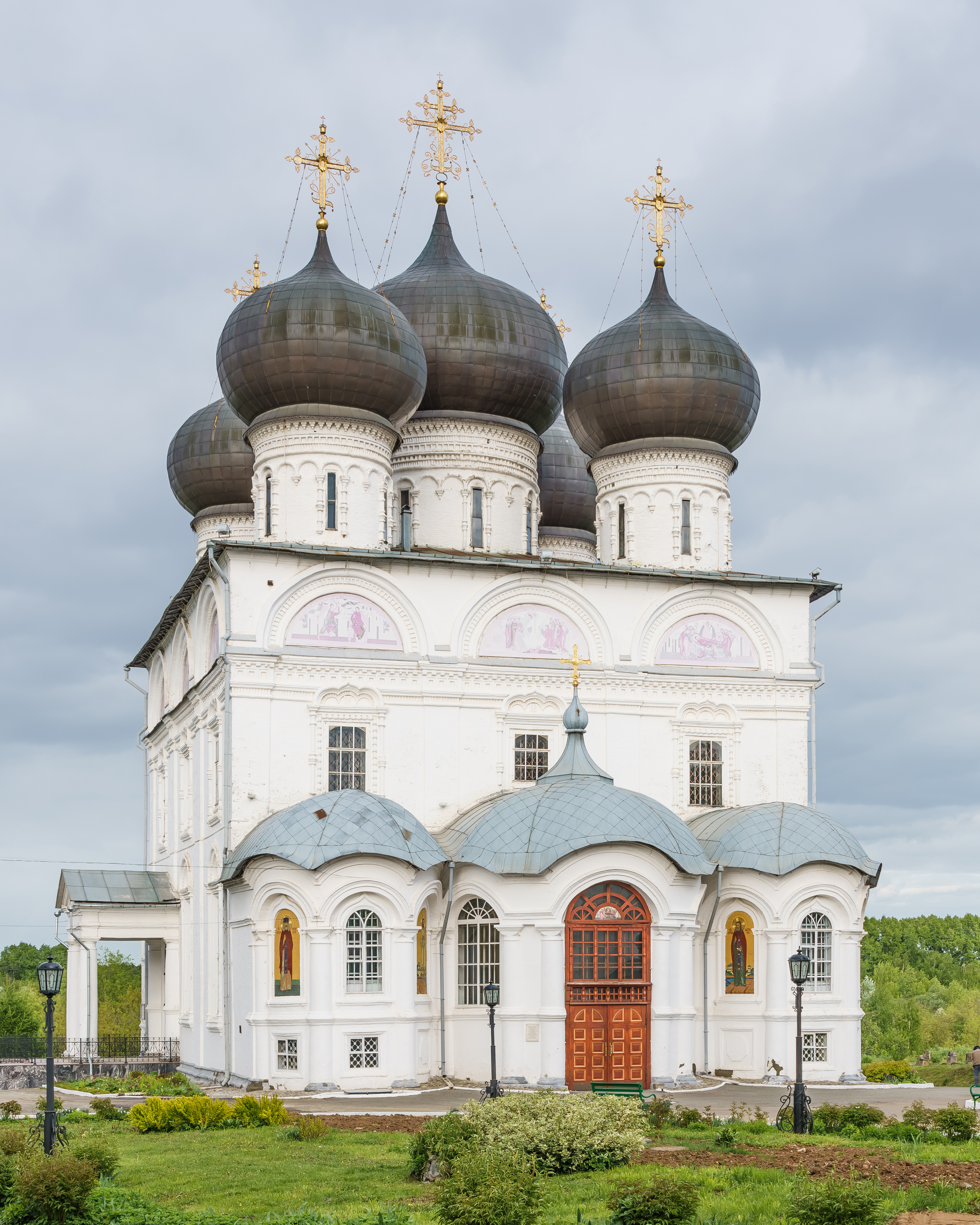
- Assumption cathedral of Tryphon Monastery

Location
- Country: Russia
- Territory: Kirov Oblast
- Subdivisions: 19 blagochiniy

Statistics
- Area: 120,400 km^{2} (46,500 sq mi)
- Population: Total: 1,391,534
- Parishes: 175
- Churches: 175

Information
- Cathedral: Holy Assumption Cathedral

Current leadership
- Archbishop: Mark (Tuzhikov)

Website
- vyatskaya-eparhia.ru

The Diocese of Vyatka (Russian: Вятская епархия, Vyatskaya yeparkhiya) is a diocese of the Russian Orthodox Church which covers the exact territory of Kirov Oblast, Russia. The Assumption Cathedral in the region's capital, Kirov, is the Mother Church of this diocese.

It is headed by Archbishop Mark (Tuzhikov) and supported by the Moscow Patriarchate.

== History ==
The diocese of Vyatka and Great Perm was established in 1656. In 1799 it was renamed the diocese of Vyatka and Slobodsky after Great Perm was separated into its own diocese. It has two vicariates, one in Sarapul established in 1868, and one in Glazov established in 1889.
