= Stepan Meniok =

Ukrainian Greek Catholic bishop

Stepan Meniok, C.Ss.R.
- Archiepiscopal Exarch of Donetsk
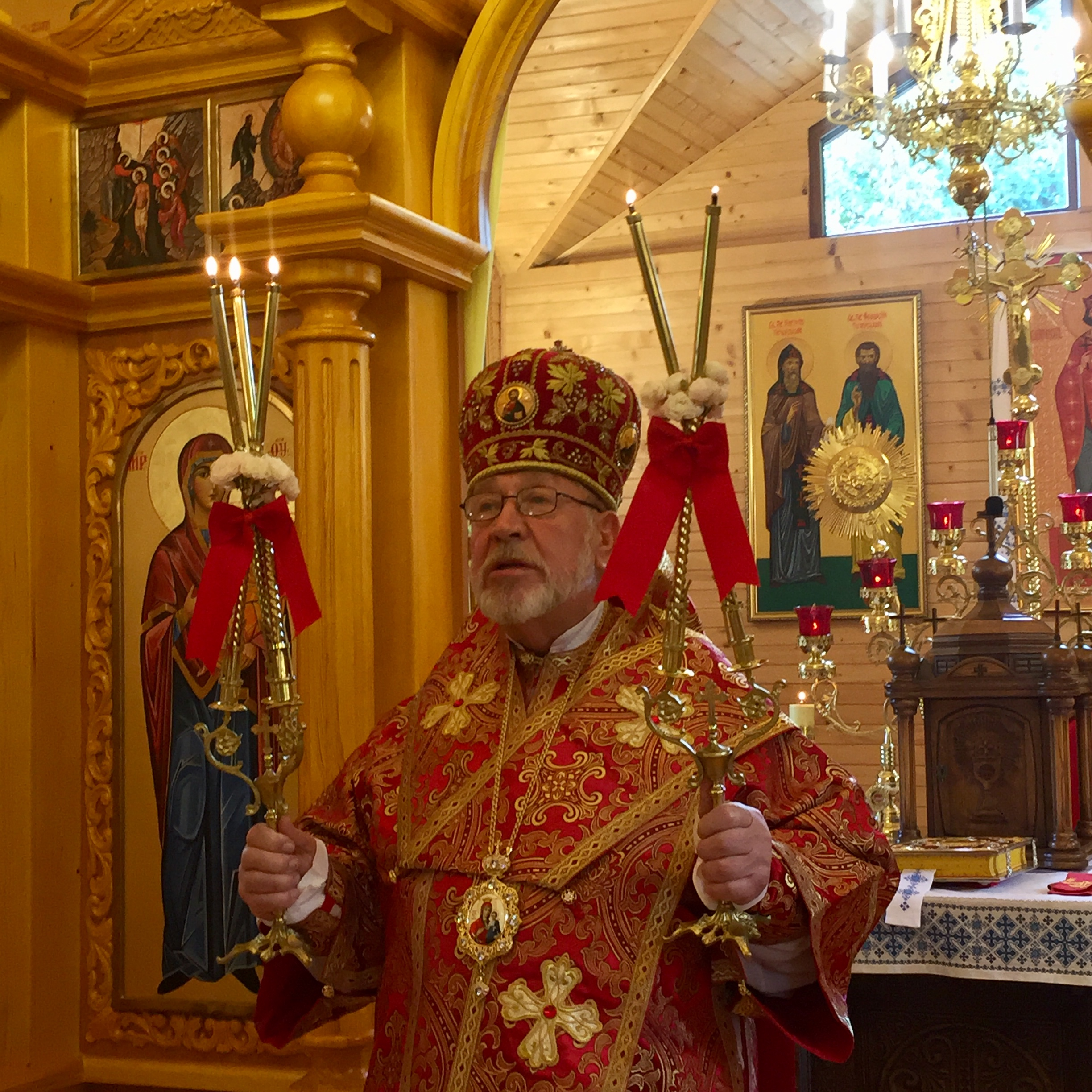
- Church: Ukrainian Greek Catholic Church
- Appointed: 11 January 2002
- Term ended: 17 October 2024
- Predecessor: new creation
- Successor: Maksym Ryabukha
- Other post: Titular Bishop of Acarassus (since 2002)

Orders
- Ordination: 8 July 1984 (Priest) by Volodymyr Sterniuk
- Consecration: 15 February 2002 (Bishop) by Lubomyr Husar

Personal details
- Born: Stepan Petrovych Meniok; 19 August 1949 (age 76) Nakonechne, Yavoriv Raion, Lviv Oblast, Ukrainian SSR

Bishop Stepan Meniok, C.Ss.R. (Ukrainian: Степан Меньок; born 19 August 1949) is a Ukrainian Greek Catholic hierarch, who serves as an Archiepiscopal Exarch of Ukrainian Catholic Archiepiscopal Exarchate of Donetsk (11 January 2002 – 17 October 2024) and a Titular Bishop of Acarassus since 11 January 2002.

Coat of arms of Bishop Stepan Meniok

== Life ==
Bishop Meniok was born in the family of clandestine Greek-Catholics Petro Meniok in Nakonechne, Yavoriv Raion, Lviv Oblast, Ukrainian SSR. After graduation of the school education, he graduated the technical college #1 in Lviv and made a compulsory service in the Soviet Army during 1969–1971.

After this time he became a clandestine member of the Congregation of the Most Holy Redeemer, where he had a profession on 8 November 1975 and a solemn profession on 8 October 1981. Meniok was ordained as priest on 8 July 1984, after completed clandestine theological studies and worked as pastor among the faithful of the "Catacomb Church" in Belz and Kamianobrid until 1990. From 1990 he openly served as priest, missionary and founder of the new Greek-Catholic parishes after the Dissolution of the Soviet Union. During 1994–1998 he was a Rector of the Theological Seminary in Lviv and after, during 1998–2002 as a Rector of the Ukrainian Redemptorists province Theological Seminary.

On 11 January 2002 Fr. Meniok was appointed and on 15 February 2002 was consecrated to the Episcopate as the first Archiepiscopal Exarch of the new created Ukrainian Catholic Archiepiscopal Exarchate of Donetsk-Kharkiv. The principal consecrator was Cardinal Lubomyr Husar, the Head of the Ukrainian Greek Catholic Church.

He retired on 17 October 2024, after turning an age limit of 75 years old.

Catholic Church titles
Preceded by Yulian Voronovskyi	Rector of the Major Theological Seminary in Lviv; 1994–1998	Succeeded by Bohdan Prach
Preceded by Stefan Soroka	Titular Bishop of Acarassus; 2002–present	Incumbent
New title	Archiepiscopal Exarch of Donetsk (until 2014 as Archiepiscopal Exarch of Donetsk-Kharkiv); 2002–2024	Succeeded by Maksym Ryabukha
