= Chahda =

Chahda is a Syrian surname. Notable people with the surname include:

- Denys Antoine Chahda (born 1946), Syrian Syriac Catholic archbishop
- Matt Chahda (born 1993), Australian racing car driver
