= Ukrainian Catholic Archiepiscopal Exarchate of Donetsk =

Ukrainian Catholic missionary jurisdiction in eastern Ukraine

Coordinates: 48.0000°N 37.8000°E

Archiepiscopal Exarchate of Donetsk
- Coat of arms of Donetsk exarchate

Location
- Country: Ukraine
- Territory: Eastern Ukraine (Donetsk, Dnipropetrovsk, Luhansk and Zaporizhya Oblasts)
- Headquarters: Donetsk (temporary in Zaporizhya), Ukraine
- Population: 8,000

Information
- Sui iuris church: Ukrainian Greek Catholic
- Rite: Byzantine
- Established: January 11, 2002
- Cathedral: Catholic Cathedral in Donetsk

Current leadership
- Pope: Leo XIV
- Major Archbishop: Sviatoslav Shevchuk
- Archiepiscopal Exarch: Maksym Ryabukha, S.D.B. Exarch of the Archiepiscopal Exarchate of Donetsk

Map

The Ukrainian Catholic Archiepiscopal Exarchate of Donetsk (Latin: Archiepiscopi Exarchatus Doneckiensis) is one of the Ukrainian Greek Catholic Church (Byzantine Rite, Ukrainian language)'s five Archiepiscopal Exarchate (Eastern Catholic pre-diocesan missionary jurisdiction under a Major Archbishop) in Eastern Ukraine.

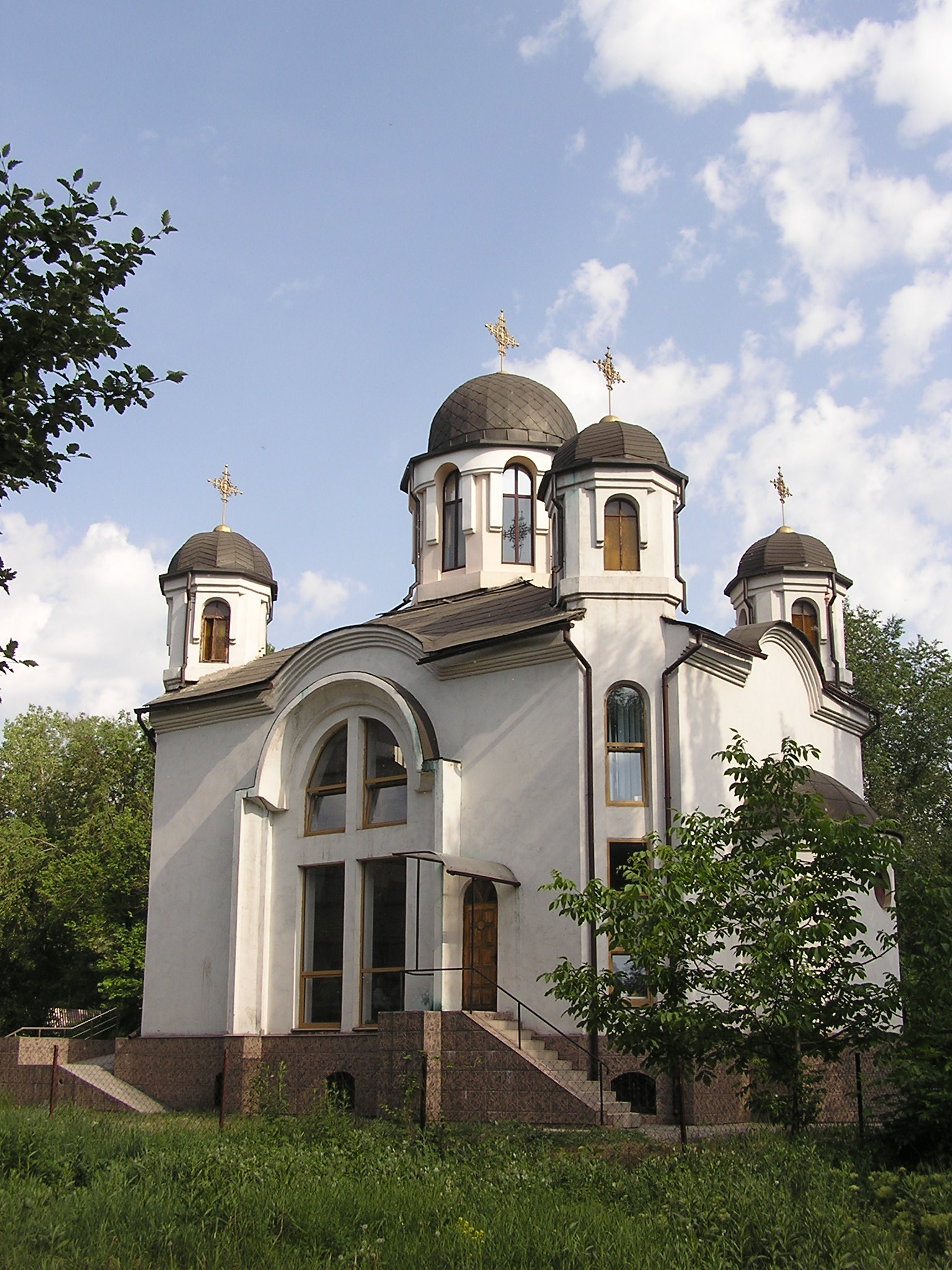
Church of the Holy Mother of God, Donetsk

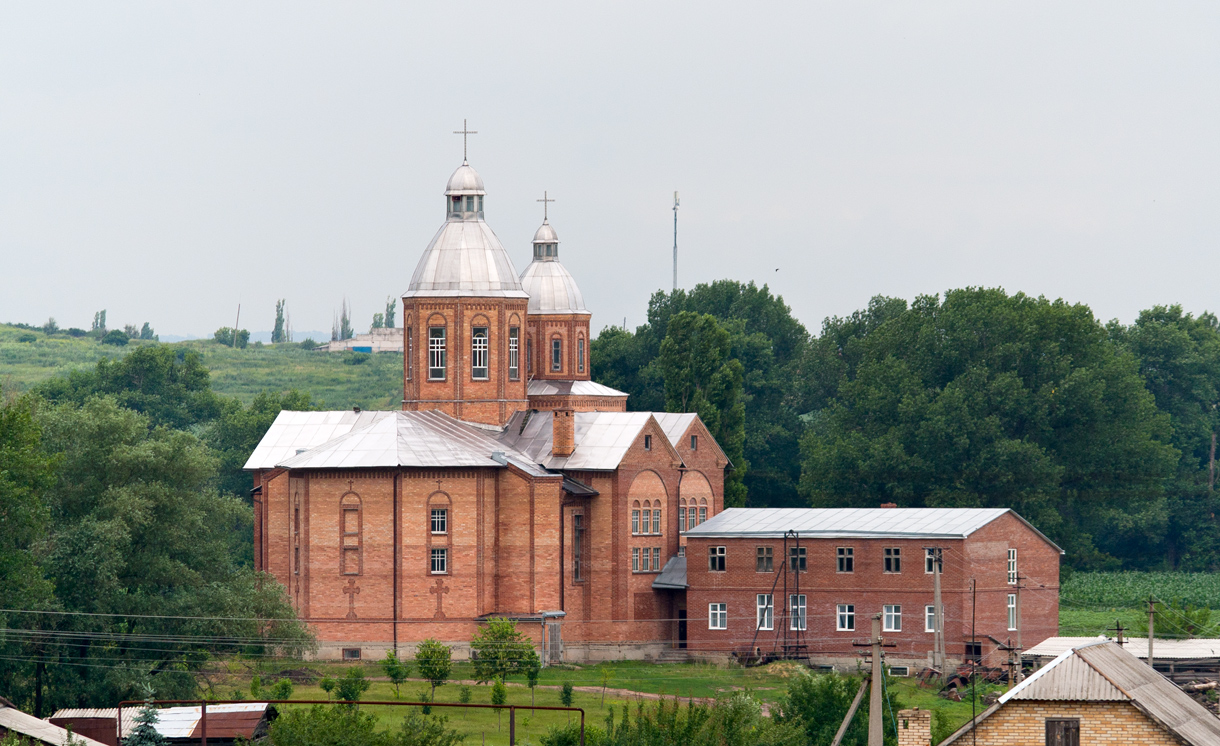
Monastery of the Heart of Christ, Zvanivka

Its cathedral episcopal see is the Cathedral of the Virgin of Mercy, in Donetsk. There is a Basilian monastery at Zvanivka, in the north of Donetsk Oblast.

The first archiepiscopal exarch was Bishop Stepan Meniok, C.Ss.R., who retired in 2024. He was replaced by Bishop Maksym Ryabukha.

== History ==
It was established on 11 January 2002 as the Archiepiscopal Exarchate of Donets’k – Kharkiv, on territory split off from the then Archiepiscopal Exarchate of Kyiv – Vyshhorod (which became the Ukrainian Catholic Archeparchy of Kyiv).

On 2 April 2014 the Exarchate was renamed as Ukrainian Catholic Archiepiscopal Exarchate of Donetsk, having lost territory to establish the Ukrainian Catholic Archiepiscopal Exarchate of Kharkiv.

== Russian invasion ==
The Archeparchy was seriously affected by the 2022 full-scale invasion of Ukraine by Russia, as around half of its territory was taken by Russian forces. Bishop Maksym Ryabukha told pontifical charity Aid to the Church in Need that "before the war we had over 80 parishes, and now we have only 37 active parishes. The rest were closed, occupied or destroyed." He went on to say that "the laws of the occupation force forbid any affiliation with the Catholic Church, either Greek-Catholic or Latin rite, and it is very difficult to provide any sort of ministry there. My exarchate no longer has any priests in these territories, all our churches have been destroyed, or they are closed and people are not allowed to attend them."

In the same interview he described himself as a "bishop on wheels", and described the state of mind of his faithful: "We feel helpless, because it is as if nobody sees what is happening. What hurts most is seeing that the world remains silent while civilian areas are bombed and people are killed. From a practical standpoint, we can’t see a significant response from the world. The only thing that gives us hope is that God is stronger than the evil we can find in the world."

In a second interview with ACN, in August 2026, Bishop Ryabukha explained that over the course of the previous year the situation on the ground had changed. "One year ago, if you were around 20 kilometres from the front line you were pretty much safe. Today, given the massive use of drones and guided bombs, anywhere under 50 kilometres is extremely dangerous." He went on to describe the systematic razing of buildings by Russian forces, including of Catholic churches, giving the example of the Greek-Catholic church in Kostantynivka.

== Episcopal ordinaries ==
Archiepiscopal Exarch of Donetsk–Kharkiv

- Stepan Meniok, C.SS.R. (2002.01.11 – 2014.04.02 see below), Titular Bishop of Acarassus (2002.01.11 – ...)
  - Auxiliary Bishop Wasyl Ihor Medwit, O.S.B.M. (2009.03.17 – 2013.10.25), emeritus; previously Auxiliary Bishop of Lviv of the Ukrainians (Ukraine) (1994.03.30 – 1996.09.30), Titular Bishop of Hadriane (1994.03.30 – ...), Apostolic Visitor in Kazakhstan and Central Asia of the Ukrainians (1996.09.30 – 2002.10), Archiepiscopal Exarch of Kyiv–Vyshhorod of the Ukrainians (Ukraine) (1997.09.20 – 2004.12.06), Bishop of Curia of the Ukrainians (2004.12.06 – 2009.03.17)

Archiepiscopal Exarchs of Donetsk

- Stephan Meniok, C.SS.R. (see above 2014.04.02 – 2024.10.17)
- Maksym Ryabukha, S.D.B. (2024.10.17 – ...), Auxiliary Bishop of Donetsk (2022.09.19 – 2024.10.17),

== Sources and external links ==
- Exarchate website
- GCatholic.org with incumbent biography links
- Profile at catholic-hierarchy.org
