= Exarchate of Istanbul =

Exarchate of Istanbul may refer to the following Ecclesiastical pre-diocesan jurisdictions with episcopal see in Istanbul (formerly Constantinople) in modern Turkey :

- Greek Catholic Apostolic Exarchate of Istanbul (Byzantine Rite, Greek language)
- Melkite Catholic Patriarchal Exarchate of Istanbul (Byzantine Rite, Arabic language)

== See also ==
- Patriarchal Exarchate of Jerusalem (disambiguation)
