= Apostolic Exarchate of Canada =

Apostolic Exarchate of Canada may refer to:

- Syro-Malabar Catholic Apostolic Exarchate of Canada
- Syriac Catholic Apostolic Exarchate of Canada
- Ukrainian Catholic Archeparchy of Winnipeg, formerly called as Apostolic Exarchate of Canada
