= Syriac Catholic Patriarchal Exarchate of Lebanon =

Former Eastern Catholic missionary jurisdiction in Lebanon

The Syriac Catholic Patriarchal Exarchate of Lebanon was a short-lived 20th-century jurisdiction of the Eastern Catholic Syriac Catholic Church (Antiochian Rite in Syriac language) in the Patriarch's own host country, Lebanon.

== History ==
It was established in 1991 as a Patriarchal Exarchate of the Patriarch in his own see Antioch's Lebanese host city, Beirut.

It was suppressed in 1997, its territory again being covered by the particular church's Syriac Catholic Patriarchate of Antioch and its own Metropolitanate in its see.

== Episcopal ordinaries ==
Patriarchal Vicars of Lebanon of the Syriacs

- Archbishop Flavien Zacharie Melki (1963.07.06 – 1983), Titular Archbishop of Amida of the Syriacs (1963.07.06 – 1989.11.30)
- Archbishop Raboula Antoine Beylouni (1983.07.12 – 1984) Titular Bishop of Mardin of the Syriacs (1983.07.12 – 1991.06.01); later Vicar General of Antioch of the Syriacs (Lebanon) (1984 – 1989), Archeparch (Archbishop) of Aleppo of the Syriacs (Syria) (1991.06.01 – 2000.09.16), Bishop of Curia of the Syriacs (2000 – 2011.03.01) & Titular Archbishop of Mardin of the Syriacs (2000.09.16 – ...)
- Msgr. Raphaël Chahine (1990 – 1991)

== See also ==
- Syriac Catholic Eparchy of Beirut

== Source and External links ==
- GCatholic with incumbent biography links
