= Cathedral of Our Lady of the Assumption in Maracay (Syriac Catholic) =

Cathedral of Our Lady of the Assumption
- Catedral de Nuestra Señora de la Asunción
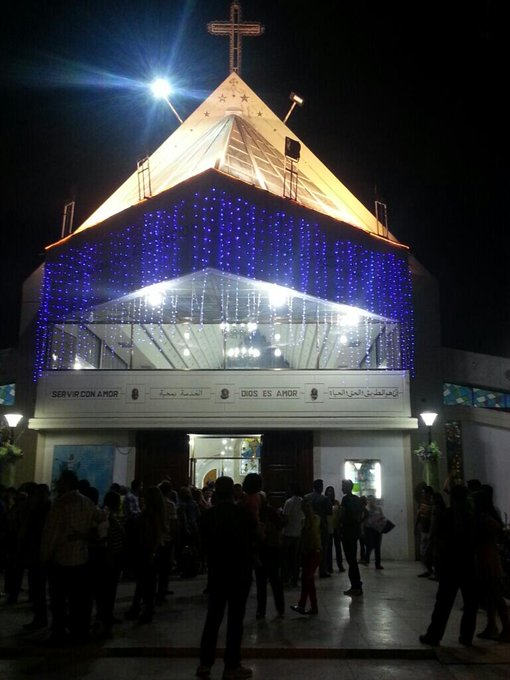
- Cathedral of Our Lady of the Assumption
- Location: San Jacinto, Maracay
- Country: Venezuela
- Denomination: Catholic Church
- Sui iuris church: Syriac Catholic Church

The Cathedral of Our Lady of the Assumption (Spanish: Catedral de Nuestra Señora de la Asunción) Also Catedral Católica Siria de Nuestra Señora de la Asunción. It is a temple belonging to the Syriac Catholic Church one of the Eastern Catholic Churches in full communion with the Holy See in Rome. It is located on the first street of San Jacinto sector in the city of Maracay, Aragua state, in north central part of South American country of Venezuela. It should not be confused with another cathedral also dedicated to the same Marian devotion, but governed by the Latin Church of the Catholic Church in the same city.

It serves as the headquarters of the Syriac Catholic Apostolic Exarchate of Venezuela (Exarchatus Apostolicus ritus pro Fidelibus Antiocheni Syrorum in Venetiola) that was created on June 22, 2001 by Pope John Paul II by the Apostolic Constitution Ecclesial communitates.

It is one of the three parishes of this rite in Venezuela being the other 2 those dedicated to Our Lady of Amparo in Puerto la Cruz, Anzoátegui, and San Jorge in Barquisimeto, Lara State.

== See also ==
- Roman Catholicism in Venezuela
- Our Lady of the Assumption Cathedral, Maracay
