= Yakiv Medvetskyi =

Very Rev. Yakiv Medvetskyi
- Apostolic Administrator of Apostolic Administration of Lemkowszczyzna
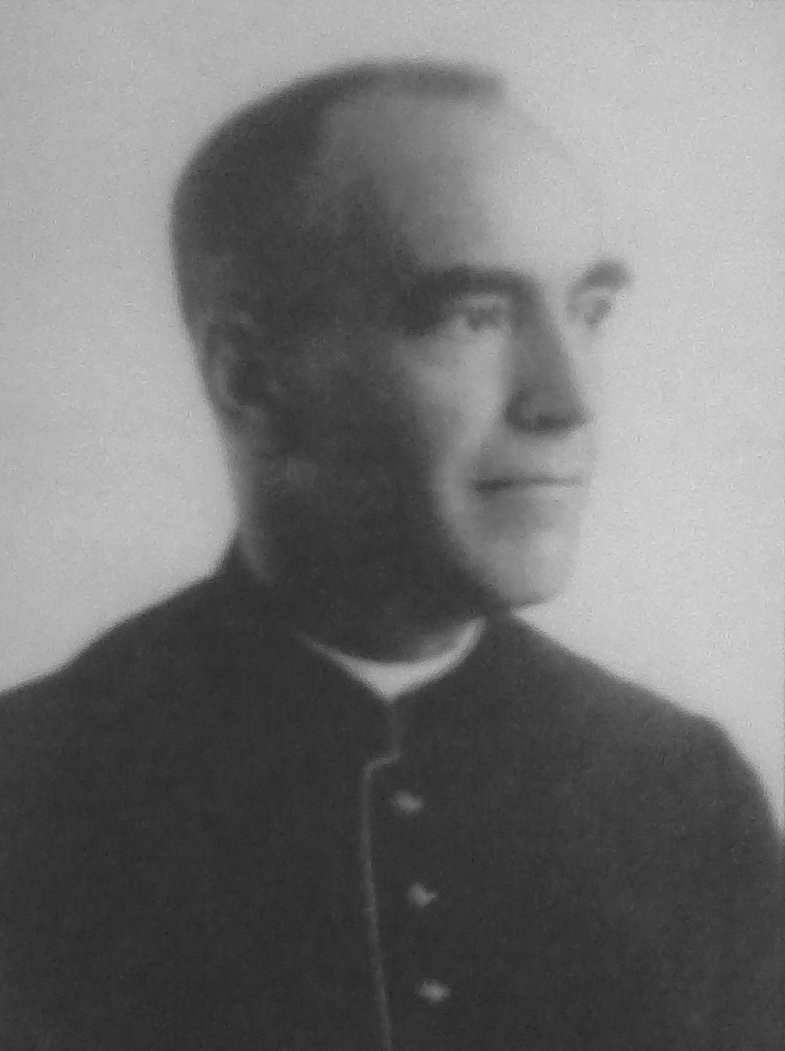
- Church: Ukrainian Greek Catholic Church
- Appointed: 3 July 1936
- Term ended: 27 January 1941
- Predecessor: Vasyl Mastsiukh
- Successor: Oleksandr Malynovskyi

Orders
- Ordination: 7 April 1905 (Priest) by Blessed Hryhoriy Khomyshyn

Personal details
- Born: Yakiv Medvetskyi; 7 January 1880 Tsvitova, Austro-Hungarian Empire (present day in Chortkiv Raion, Ternopil Oblast, Ukraine)
- Died: 27 January 1941 (aged 61) Kraków, General Government (present day Poland)

Very Reverend Yakiv Medvetskyi (Ukrainian: Яків Медвецький; Polish: Jakub Medwecki; 7 January 1880 in Tsvitova, Austro-Hungarian Empire /present day in Chortkiv Raion, Ternopil Oblast, Ukraine/ – 27 January 1941 in Kraków, General Government /present day in Poland/) was a Greek Catholic hierarch. He served as the second Apostolic Administrator of the Apostolic Administration of Lemkowszczyzna from 3 July 1936 until his death on 27 January 1941.

== Life ==
Yakiv Medvetskyi was born in the family of Greek-Catholics in 1880 in the Ukrainian Catholic Archeparchy of Lviv. After graduation of the popular school and gymnasium education in Buchach and Stanislaviv, he joined the Greek-Catholic Theological Seminary in Lviv (1900–1904).

He was ordained as priest on 7 April 1905 by Bishop Blessed Hryhoriy Khomyshyn for the Eparchy of Stanislaviv, after completed his studies. After the one year parish work, Fr. Medvetskyi continued to study in the University of Vienna with Doctor of Theology degree in 1910. He was a professor of the Biblical subjects in the Theological Seminary in Stanislaviv from 1910 until 1936 and vice-rector of the same Seminary from 1912 until 1936.

On 3 July 1936 Fr. Medvetskyi was appointed by Pope Pius XI the second Apostolic Administrator of the Apostolic Administration of Lemkowszczyzna (that later was elevated in the rank of Apostolic Exarchate) without dignity of bishop.

Apostolic Administrator Medvetskyi suffered from diabetes mellitus. He died in a hospital in Kraków, due to complications after surgery on 27 January 1941 at the age 61.

Catholic Church titles
Preceded by Vasyl Mastsiukh	Apostolic Administrator of Łemkowszczyzna; 1936–1941	Succeeded by Oleksandr Malynovskyi
