= Maksym Ryabukha =

Ukrainian Greek Catholic bishop

Maksym Ryabukha, S.D.B.
- Titular Bishop of Stephaniacum, Archiepiscopal Exarch of Donetsk
- Church: Ukrainian Greek Catholic Church
- Appointed: 17 October 2024
- Predecessor: Stepan Meniok
- Previous posts: Superior of the Salesian community in Kyiv (2018–2022), Auxiliary Bishop of Donetsk (2022–2024)

Orders
- Ordination: 4 August 2007 (Priest) by Andrés Sapelak
- Consecration: 22 December 2022 (Bishop) by Sviatoslav Shevchuk

Personal details
- Born: Maksym Ryabukha; 18 May 1980 (age 46) Lviv, Ukrainian SSR
- Denomination: Ukrainian Greek Catholic
- Coat of arms

Bishop Maksym Ryabukha, S.D.B. (Ukrainian: Максим Рябуха; born 18 May 1980) is a Ukrainian Greek Catholic hierarch as Titular Bishop of Stephaniacum and Archiepiscopal Exarch of Donetsk since 17 October 2024. Previously he served as an Auxiliary Bishop of the Archiepiscopal Exarchate of Donetsk since 19 September 2022 until 17 October 2024.

== Early life and formation ==
Bishop Ryabukha was born in Lviv and grew up as a parishioner of the local Salesian Church of Protection of the Mother of God. After graduation from the school education in Lviv, he joined a pre-novitiate of the Salesians Congregation in Obroshyne in 1997 and after a Salesian novitiate in Nave, Italy (1998–1999); he made a profession in 1999 and a solemn profession on 19 August 2005, simultaneously studying in the Salesian Pontifical University (1999–2001, 2003–2006). After returning to Ukraine, he was ordained as a deacon on 24 June 2006 and as a priest on 4 August 2007. Both ordinations were made by Bishop Andrés Sapelak, S.D.B. in the Church of Protection of the Mother of God in Lviv.

== Educational and pastoral career ==
Fr. Ryabukha served in the different local Salesian communities, working as a youth leader and in 2013 was sent to Kyiv to make a Salesian fundation in the capital and in 2018 became its first superior. At the same time he studied at the Interregional Academy of Personnel Management with specialist in law degree (2008–2011), Lviv Polytechnic with master's degree in educational institution management (2011–2012) and Vasyl Stefanyk Precarpathian National University with master's degree in social pedagogy (2012–2015). Also he worked as a lecturer in the Three Saint Hierarchs Major Theological Seminary in Kyiv (2013–2022).

From February 2016 to July 2018, he worked in the Apostolic Nunciature to Ukraine, acting as a translator of the Apostolic Nuncio in Ukraine.

== Bishop ==
On 19 September 2022, he was confirmed by Pope Francis as an Auxiliary Bishop of the Archiepiscopal Exarchate of Donetsk and appointed as a Titular Bishop of Stephaniacum. He was consecrated as a bishop by Major Archbishop Sviatoslav Shevchuk and co-consecrators: bishop Stepan Meniok and bishop Yosyf Milyan in the Cathedral of the Resurrection of Christ in Kyiv on 22 December 2022.

On 17 October 2024 he was appointed as the second Archiepiscopal Exarch of Donetsk.

== Russian invasion ==
The archepiscopal exarchate of Donetsk was seriously affected by the 2022 full-scale invasion of Ukraine by Russia, as around half of its territory was taken by Russian forces. Bishop Maksym Ryabukha told pontifical charity Aid to the Church in Need that "before the war we had over 80 parishes, and now we have only 37 active parishes. The rest were closed, occupied or destroyed." He went on to say that "the laws of the occupation force forbid any affiliation with the Catholic Church, either Greek-Catholic or Latin rite, and it is very difficult to provide any sort of ministry there. My exarchate no longer has any priests in these territories, all our churches have been destroyed, or they are closed and people are not allowed to attend them."

In the same interview he described himself as a "bishop on wheels", and described the state of mind of his faithful: "We feel helpless, because it is as if nobody sees what is happening. What hurts most is seeing that the world remains silent while civilian areas are bombed and people are killed. From a practical standpoint, we can’t see a significant response from the world. The only thing that gives us hope is that God is stronger than the evil we can find in the world."

In a second interview with ACN, in August 2026, Bishop Ryabukha explained that over the course of the previous year the situation on the ground had changed. "One year ago, if you were around 20 kilometres from the front line you were pretty much safe. Today, given the massive use of drones and guided bombs, anywhere under 50 kilometres is extremely dangerous." He went on to describe the systematic razing of buildings by Russian forces, including of Catholic churches, giving the example of the Greek-Catholic church in Kostantynivka.

In the August interview he described his ministry as one of proximity. "I cannot stop the war, nor change the course of military history, but I can be close to people: in prayer, in dialogue and through my pastoral presence. Despite the tragedy, I can see clearly that God does not abandon us. There are constant signs of hope." Asked about what he has learned from the war, he answered: "that however great evil is, it will never destroy everything".

Catholic Church titles
Preceded by Marcelo Julián Margni	Titular Bishop of Stephaniacum; 2022–	Incumbent
Preceded by Stepan Meniok	Archiepiscopal Exarch of Donetsk; 2024–present	Incumbent
