= Oleksandr Malynovskyi =

Very Rev. Oleksandr Malynovskyi
- Apostolic Exarch of Apostolic Exarchate of Lemkowszczyzna
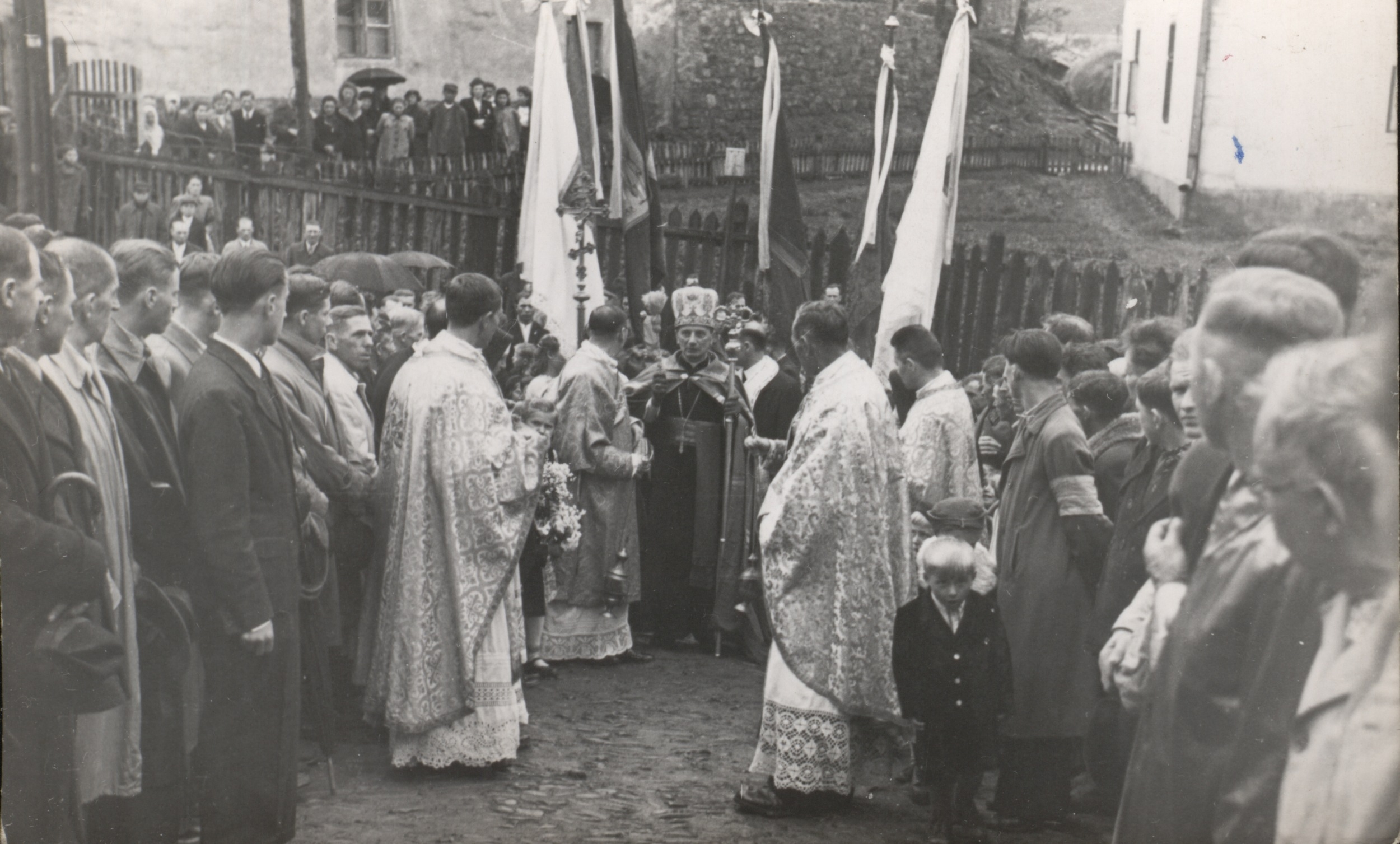
- Church: Ukrainian Greek Catholic Church
- Appointed: 5 February 1941
- Term ended: c.15 September 1945
- Predecessor: Yakiv Medvetskyi
- Successor: Vacant
- Other posts: Rector of Greek-Catholic Theological Seminary in Culemborg (1948–1950), Vicar General of the Ukrainian Greek-Catholics in the United Kingdom (1951–1957)

Orders
- Ordination: 1925 (Priest) by Andriy Sheptytsky

Personal details
- Born: Oleksandr Ivanovych Malynovskyi; 12 January 1889 Zhukiv, Austro-Hungarian Empire (present day in Zolochiv Raion, Lviv Oblast, Ukraine)
- Died: 18 November 1957 (aged 68) Bradford, United Kingdom

Very Reverend Oleksandr Malynovskyi (Ukrainian: Олександр Малиновський; 12 January 1889 in Zhukiv, Austro-Hungarian Empire /present day in Zolochiv Raion, Lviv Oblast, Ukraine/ – 18 November 1957 in Bradford, United Kingdom) was a Greek Catholic hierarch. He served as the Apostolic Exarch of the Apostolic Exarchate of Lemkowszczyzna from 5 February 1941 until his resignation in September 1945.

== Biography ==
Oleksandr Malynovskyi was born in the family of the Ukrainian Greek-Catholic priest Rev. Ivan and his wife Valeriya (née Perfetska) Malynovskyi in 1889 in the Ukrainian Catholic Archeparchy of Lviv.

=== Military career ===
After graduation of the male gymnasium in Przemyśl in 1906, he joined Faculty of Law of the Lviv University and subsequently enter the ⁣Austro-Hungarian Army. Participated in the I World War in rank of oberleutnant and after proclamation of independence of the West Ukrainian People's Republic he joined the Ukrainian Galician Army, until his retirement in 1919.

=== Ecclesiastical Service ===
Malynovskyi joined the Greek-Catholic Theological Seminary in Lviv (1921–1925) and was ordained as priest in 1925 by Metropolitan Andriy Sheptytsky for the Ukrainian Catholic Archeparchy of Lviv, after completed his studies. After the one-year parish work, Fr. Malynovskyi become prefect (1926–1932) and vice-rector (1932–1939) in the Theological Seminary in Lviv. From 1940 until 1941 he served as Vicar General of the Apostolic Administration of Lemkowszczyzna.

On 5 February 1941, Fr. Malynovskyi was appointed as Apostolic Administrator (and later – Apostolic Exarch) of the Apostolic Administration of Lemkowszczyzna (that later was elevated in the rank of Apostolic Exarchate) without dignity of bishop.

In September 1945 he resigned as Apostolic Exarch and escaped in the West, threatened with arrest and deportation to the Soviet Union. He became prefect of the Ukrainian Theological Seminary in Hirschberg, Germany (1946–1948) and after transfer the Seminary to Culemborg, Netherlands, it rector (1948–1950). His last years, Monsignor Malynovskyi spent in the United Kingdom, where he served as Vicar General for the Ukrainian Greek-Catholics (1951–1957) and Vicar General of the Apostolic Exarchate of England and Wales (1957). He died on 18 November 1957 at the age 68.

Catholic Church titles
Preceded by Yakiv Medvetskyi	Apostolic Exarch of Łemkowszczyzna; 1941–1945	Succeeded by Vacant
