= Syriac Catholic Eparchy of Beirut =

Syriac Catholic ecclesiastical territory in Lebanon

Eparchy of Beirut
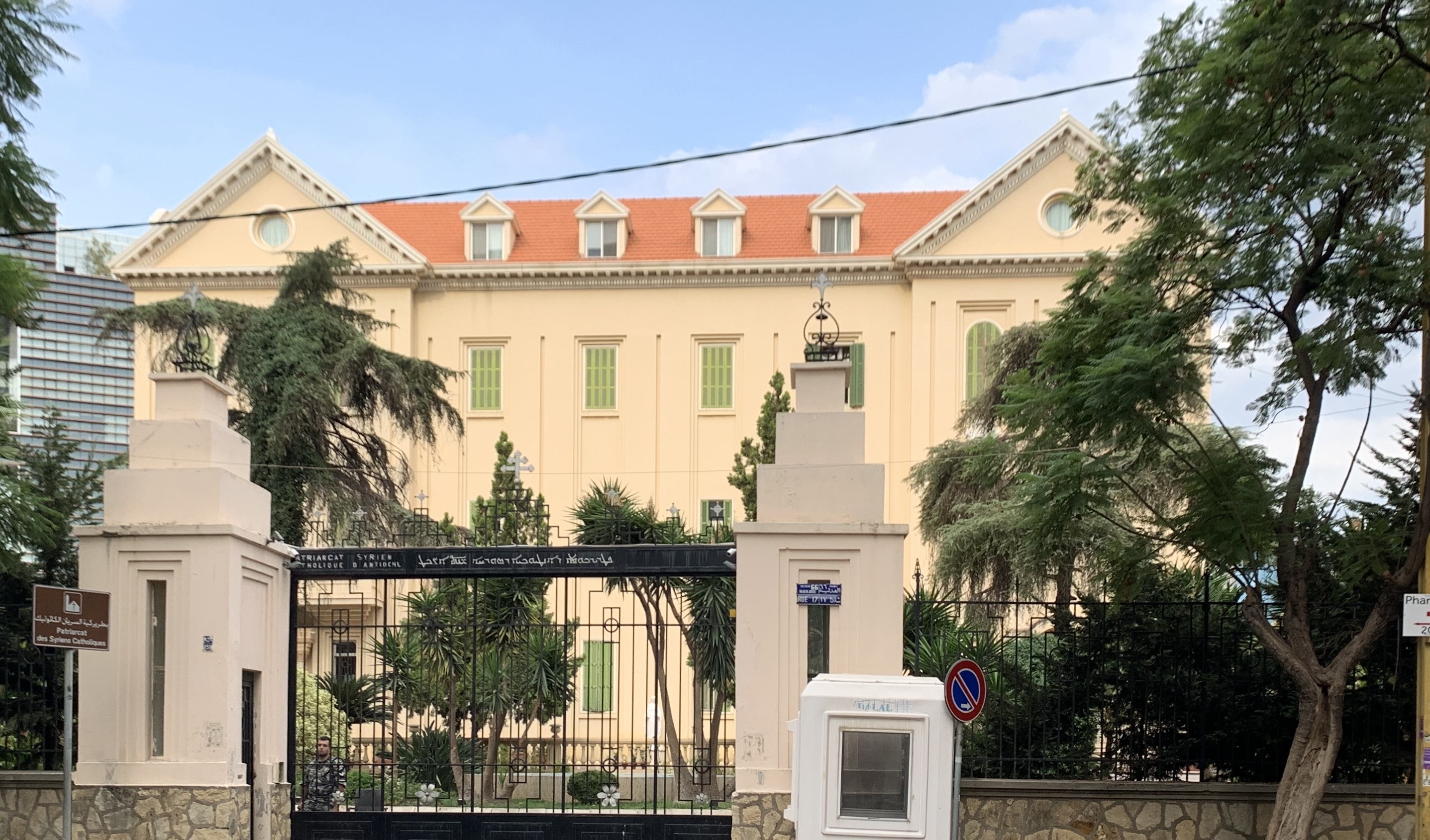
- Beirut patriarchate building

Location
- Country: Lebanon
- Coordinates: 33°52′41″N 35°31′01″E

Information
- Denomination: Catholic Church
- Sui iuris church: Syriac Catholic Church
- Rite: West Syriac Rite
- Established: 1819

Current leadership
- Pope: Francis
- Patriarch: Ignatius Joseph III Yonan

The Syriac Catholic Patriarchal Eparchy of Beirut is a Syriac Catholic Church ecclesiastical territory or eparchy of the Catholic Church in Lebanon. The Syriac Catholic Patriarch of Antioch's cathedra is found in the eparchy in the episcopal see of Beirut, the capital of Lebanon.

== History ==
It was established in 1819. Generally, the Syriac Catholic Patriarch of Antioch will administer the Eparchy of Beirut as its ordinary and sole episcopal officer, but he may also appoint a proper eparch.

Pope Benedict XVI visited the eparchy in September 2012.

== Episcopal ordinaries ==
Incomplete list

Eparchs (Bishops) of Beirut

- Efrem Rahmani (1890.09.20 – 1894.05.01), formerly Titular Archbishop of Edessa in Osrhoëne of the Syriacs (1887.10.02 – 1890.09.20); later Archeparch (Archbishop) of Aleppo of the Syriacs (Syria) (1894.05.01 – 1898.10.09), Eparch (Bishop) of Mardin and Amida of the Syriacs (Turkey) (1898.10.09 – 1929.05.07), Patriarch of Antioch of the Syriacs (Lebanon) as Ignace Dionisio Efrem II Rahmani ([1898.10.09] 1898.11.28 – death 1929.05.07)
- Apostolic Administrator Théophile Georges Kassab (2008.02.02 – 2009.01.20), while Metropolitan Archeparch of Homs of the Syriacs (Syria) ([1999.05.08] 1999.12.18 – 2013.10.22)

== See also ==
- Syrian Catholic Patriarchal Exarchate of Lebanon

== Source and External links ==
- GCatholic with incumbent bio links
