= Syriac Catholic Apostolic Exarchate of Canada =

Syriac Catholic missionary jurisdiction

Coordinates: 45.5413°N 73.7296°W

Apostolic Exarchate of Canada

Location
- Country: Canada

Statistics
- Parishes: 6

Information
- Denomination: Catholic Church
- Sui iuris church: Syriac Catholic Church
- Rite: West Syriac Rite
- Established: 7 January 2016
- Cathedral: Cathédrale syriaque Saint-Éphrem, Laval, Quebec

Current leadership
- Pope: Leo XIV
- Eparch: Antoine Nassif

The Syriac Catholic Apostolic Exarchate of Canada (informally Canada of the Syriacs) is a Syriac Catholic Church ecclesiastical jurisdiction or apostolic exarchate of the Catholic Church in Canada.

It is exempt directly to the Holy See (specifically the Congregation for the Oriental Churches), and not part of any ecclesiastical province.

The cathedral church of the exarchate is the Cathédrale syriaque Saint-Éphrem in Laval, Quebec.

== History ==
Established on 7 January 2016 as Apostolic Exarchate of Canada, on territory split off from the Syriac Catholic Eparchy of Our Lady of Deliverance of Newark in the United States. On the same day, Antoine Nassif was appointed eparch-elect and titular bishop of Serigene. He was ordained as bishop on 23 January 2016.

== Apostolic exarchs ==
(Syriac Catholic Church)

- Antoine Nassif, appointed January 3, 2016

== Extent ==
It comprises six churches, in five local communities in Ontario and Quebec:

in Ontario

- Cambridge, Ontario
- Mississauga, Ontario
- Ottawa, Ontario

in Quebec

- Laval, Quebec
- Montreal, Quebec

== Source and External links ==
- GCatholic with incumbent bio links
