= Metropolis (religious jurisdiction) =

Administrative seat held by a bishop, typically covering a city and surroundings

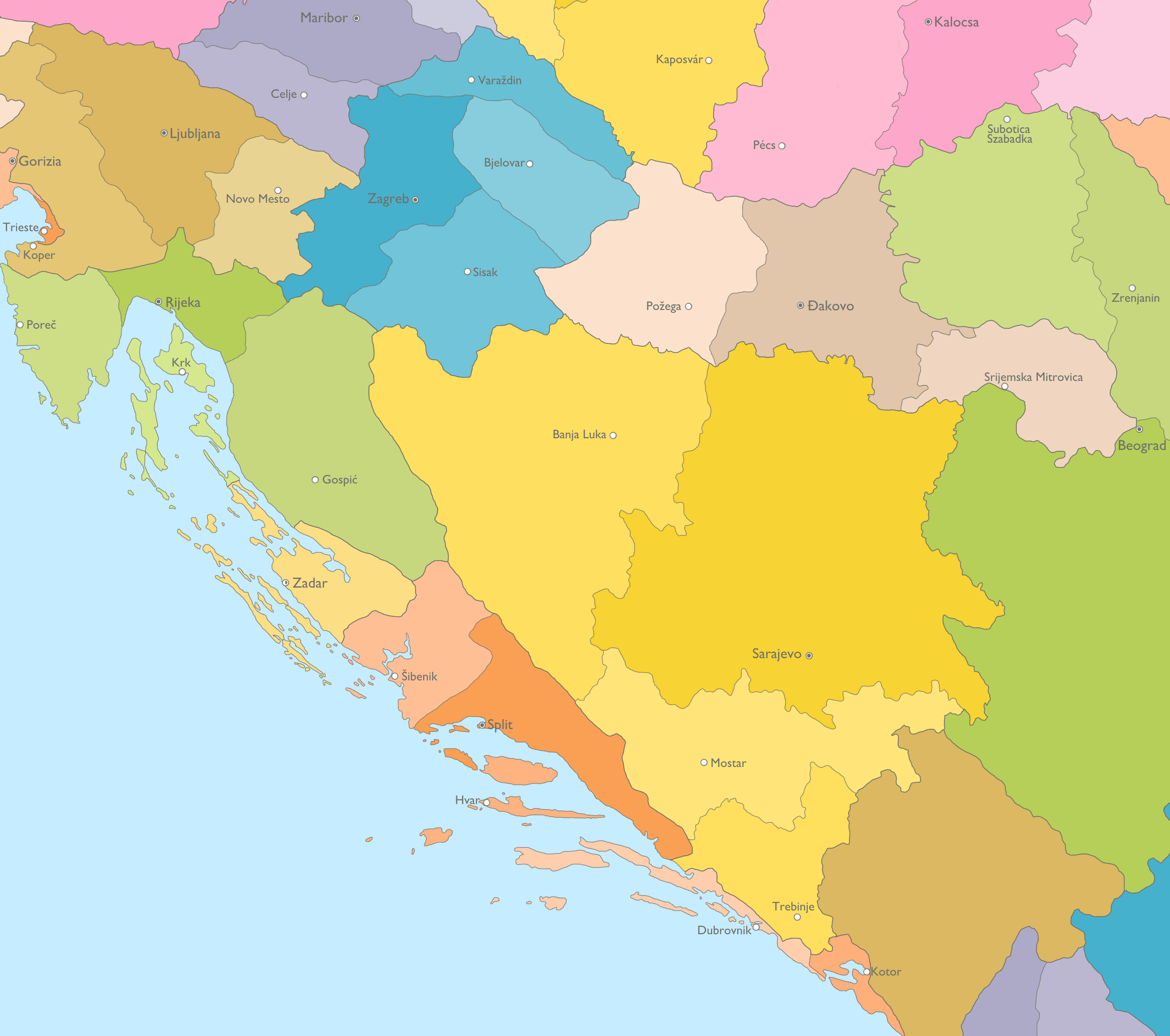
Roman Catholic metropolitan dioceses in the Western Balkans

A metropolis, metropolitanate or metropolitan diocese is an episcopal see whose bishop is the metropolitan bishop or archbishop of an ecclesiastical province. Metropolises, historically, have been important cities in their provinces.

== Eastern Orthodox ==
In the Eastern Orthodox Church, a metropolis (also called metropolia or metropolitanate) is a type of diocese, along with eparchies, exarchates and archdioceses. In the churches of Greek Orthodoxy, every diocese is a metropolis, headed by a metropolitan while auxiliary bishops are the only non-metropolitan bishops.

In non-Greek Orthodox churches, mainly Slavic Orthodox, the title of Metropolitan is given to the heads of autocephalous churches or of a few important episcopal sees.

== Catholic Church ==
In the Latin Church, or Western Church, of the Catholic Church, a metropolitan see is the chief episcopal see of an ecclesiastical province. Its ordinary is a metropolitan archbishop and the see itself is an archdiocese. It has at least one suffragan diocese.

There are very few suffragan sees that have the rank of archdiocese, such as the Archdiocese of Avignon that is a suffragan of the Archdiocese of Marseille. Other non-metropolitan archdioceses are directly subject to the Holy See and are merely "aggregated" to an ecclesiastical province, without being part of it.

In the Eastern Catholic Churches, a metropolitanate is an autonomous church of a lower category than the patriarchal and the major archiepiscopal churches and is headed by a single metropolitan of a fixed episcopal see.

== See also ==
- Hierarchy of the Catholic Church
