= Melkite Greek Catholic Patriarchal Exarchate of Iraq =

Eastern Catholic missionary jurisdiction in Iraq

Patriarchal Exarchate of Iraq (Melkite Greek)

Location
- Country: Iraq

Statistics
- Population: (as of 2011); 400
- Parishes: 1

Information
- Denomination: Melkite Greek Catholic Church
- Rite: Byzantine Rite
- Established: 1838

Current leadership
- Pope: Leo XIV
- Patriarch: Youssef Absi
- Patriarchal Exarch: Sede vacante

Melkite (Greek) Catholic Patriarchal Exarchate of Iraq (informally Iraq of the (Greek-)Melkites) is a Patriarchal exarchate (Eastern Catholic pre-diocesan missionary jurisdiction) of the Melkite Greek Catholic Church sui iuris (Byzantine Rite in Greek language for part of Iraq.

It is immediately subject to the Patriarchate of Antioch of the Melkites, not part of its or any other ecclesiastical province, and in Rome depends on the Congregation for the Oriental Churches. It is currently vacant.

== Territory and statistics ==
The Exarchate extends its jurisdiction over the Melkite Greek Catholic faithful in Iraq.

There is only one parish, in Baghdad, whose church of San Giorgio opened on April 27, 1962. In 2011 there were 400 baptized Melkite Catholics belonging to the Patriarchal Exarchate.

== History ==
From the second half of the eighteenth century began to settle in Iraq Melkite Christians, to whom the Latin missionaries or clergy of other Eastern churches assuring the religious service.

Patriarch Maximos III Mazloum established the Patriarchal exarchate in Iraq on September 17, 1838, on territory previously without proper Ordinary of the particular church sui iuris.

The first Melkite-Greek Catholic priest to reside in Iraq was Father Macarios Andraos of Aleppo. He made use of the Syrian-Catholic church situated in the Akd en-Nassara district of Baghdad. At his death in 1886, he was succeeded by the Aleppine monk Romanos Kallab (1886–1926), who brought his parishioners together in the Armenian Catholic Church. Then there arrived Archimandrite Maximos Hakim (1926–1964) of the eparchial clergy of Aleppo. He began by arranging an independent chapel in the Akd en-Nassara sector already mentioned. He then undertook the construction of a new church, St George's, in east Karradeh, with a presbytery adjoining and a meeting-hall.

However it was not until the Archimandrite Maximos Hakim that the small Melkite Greek Catholic community in Iraq could have his own church dedicated to St. George; however it was bombed on October 17, 2003, during Gulf War II.

Since 2004 Patriarch Gregory III Laham, who has assumed direct responsibility for the Exarchate, entrusted pastoral service in the parish of Baghdad to the Redemptorist Vincent Vossel.

== Ordinaries ==
Patriarchal Exarchs of Iraq

- Makarios Andraos (1838 - 1886)
- Romanos Kallab (1886 - 1926)
- Maximos Hakim (1926 - 1964)
- Archimandrite Isaiah Dakkak (1964? - 1971)
- Archimandrite Basilios Kanakry (1971 - 1978), also Patriarchal Vicar of Kuwait of the Greek-Melkites (Kuwait) (25 March 1972 – 1991), later promoted Patriarchal Exarch of Kuwait of the (Greek-)Melkites (Kuwait) (1991 – retired 2002)
- Archimandrite Laurent Fayçal, Salvatorian Fathers (B.S.) (1979 - 1986 resigned)
- Archimandrite Nicholas Dagher (1986 - 1997 resigned)
- Georges El-Murr, BC (1997 - 23 June 2007 resigned), while Archepartch (Archbishop) of Petra and Philadelphia of the Greek-Melkites (Jordan) (26 August 1992 – resigned 23 June 2007) (administrator)
- Sede vacante (since 23 June 2007)

== Sources and External Links ==
- GCatholic
- http://www.pgc-lb.org/fre/melkite_greek_catholic_church/Patriarchal-Exarchate-in-Iraq
- http://www.catholic-hierarchy.org/diocese/diqme.html
- https://web.archive.org/web/20120419194326/http://www.pgc-lb.org/english/Church3.shtml#Vicariate
