= Nowa Wieś, Nowy Sącz County =

Nowa Wieś
- Village
- Location within Poland
- Coordinates: 49°30′35″N 20°53′15″E
- Country: Poland
- Voivodeship: Lesser Poland
- County: Nowy Sącz
- Gmina: Łabowa
- Population: 1,067

Nowa Wieś [ˈnɔva ˈvʲɛɕ] (Note: Lemko Rusyn: Нова Вес, Nova Ves) is a village in the administrative district of Gmina Łabowa, within Nowy Sącz County, Lesser Poland Voivodeship, in southern Poland.

The village has an approximate population of 1,067.
