= Zorava =

- Village
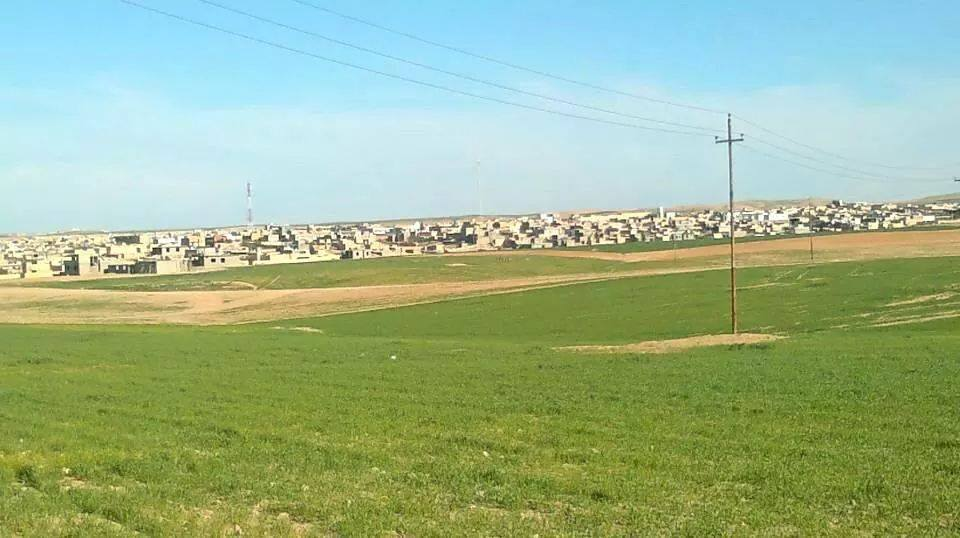

- Location in Iraq
- Coordinates: 36°28′44″N 42°0′59″E
- Country: Iraq
- Governorate: Ninawa
- District: Sinjar District

Population (July 2014)
  - Total: 7,831

Zorava (Arabic: زورافا; Kurdish: زۆراڤا, romanized: Zorava, also known in Arabic as al-Aroba) is a village located in the Sinjar District of the Ninawa Governorate in northern Iraq. The village is located north of the Sinjar Mount. It belongs to the disputed territories of Northern Iraq.

Zorava is populated by Yazidis.
