= Acarassus =

City in ancient Lycia

Acarassus, or Akarassos, was a city in ancient Lycia. The town, with high probability, was located at the site of today's Elmalı, Antalya Province, Turkey.

== Bishopric ==
Since it was in the Roman province of Lycia, the bishopric of Acarassus was a suffragan of the metropolitan see of Myra, the province's capital. It is listed in all the Notitiae Episcopatuum from the mid-7th century to about 1300. The name of only one of its bishops is known with certainty: Nicolaus attended the Council of Chalcedon in 451 and was one of the signatories of the letter that the Lycian bishops sent in 458 to Byzantine Emperor Leo I the Thracian to protest about the murder of Proterius of Alexandria. Because of the similarity of the names of Acarassus in Lycia and Acrassus in Lydia, it is unclear to which of these two sees two other bishops belonged, one of whom was at the Second Council of Nicaea in 787, the other at the Photian Council of Constantinople (879): Le Quien, Pétridès, and Darrouzès differ in their interpretations.

No longer a residential bishopric, Acarassus is today listed by the Catholic Church as a titular see.

== Literature ==
- Gustav Hirschfeld, article Akarassos in Paulys Realencyclopädie der Classischen Altertumswissenschaft, vol. I,1, p. Stuttgart 1893, p. 1150. (see German-language Wikisource)
- Louis Robert: Hellenica, vol 10, Paris 1955, pp. 207–208.
- Hansgerd Hellenkemper, Friedrich Hild: Lykien und Pamphylien (Tabula Imperii Byzantini 8.) Verlag der Österreichischen Akademie der Wissenschaften, Vienna 2004, ISBN 3-7001-3280-8, pp. 425-426.
