= Armenian Catholic Patriarchal Exarchate of Syria =

Jurisdiction of Armenian Catholic Church (1983–1997)

The Armenian Catholic Patriarchal Exarchate of Syria (Syria of the Armenians) was a short-lived (1983-1997) pre-diocesan jurisdiction of the Armenian Catholic Church (Armenian Rite in Armenian language) in Syria.

== History ==
Established in 1983 as Patriarchal Exarchate of Syria, on territory previously without Ordinary of the particular church sui iuris. It was directly dependent on the Patriarch of Cilicia of the Armenians, not part of his or any other ecclesiastical province.

Suppressed in 1997, without formal successor jurisdiction.

== Ordinaries ==
(all Armenian Rite)

Patriarchal Exarchs of Syria of the Armenians

- Paul Coussa (1969.08.26 – 1983.06.27), Titular Archbishop of Colonia in Armenia of the Armenians (1969.08.26 – 1983.06.27); later Archeparch (Archbishop) of Baghdad of the Armenians (Iraq) (1983.06.27 – retired 2001.10.13)
- Msgr. George Coussa (1983 – 1997)
- Msgr. George Tayroyan (1983 – 1997)

== See also ==
- List of Catholic dioceses in Syria
- Catholic Church in Syria

== Sources and external links ==
- GCatholic, with incumbent biography links - data for all sections
