= Apostolic Exarchate of Łemkowszczyzna =

Ukrainian Catholic missionary jurisdiction in Poland

Coordinates: 49.34°N 22.12°E

Apostolic Exarchate of Łemkowszczyzna Apostolica Exarchia Lemkovszczyznaensis Ucrainorum Апостольський Екзархат Лемківщини
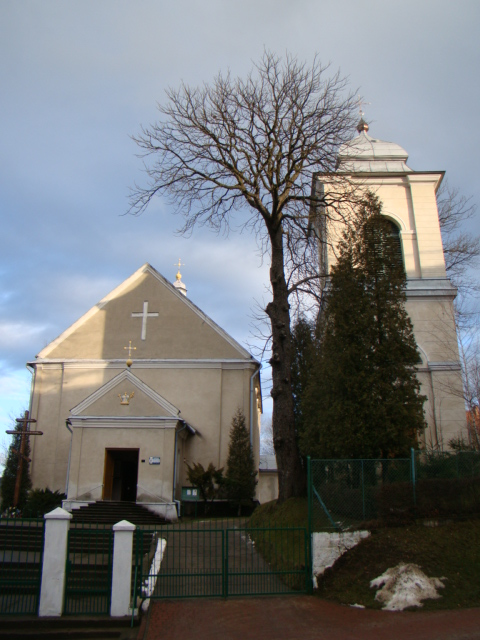
- The Holy Trinity Cathedral in Sanok (in 1946 was given to Orthodox by Polish Communist government)

Location
- Territory: Southern-Eastern part of Poland
- Ecclesiastical province: Immediately subject to the Holy See
- Headquarters: Rymanów-Zdrój (until April 30, 1938) since – Sanok
- Population: Catholics: 127,580 (in 1943)

Information
- Sui iuris church: Ukrainian Greek Catholic
- Rite: Byzantine
- Established: February 10, 1934
- Dissolved: January 16, 1991 (in fact after 1947)
- Cathedral: The Holy Trinity Church in Sanok
- Patron saint: Immacolate Virgin Mary

Leadership
- Exarch: Msgr. Oleksandr Malynovskyi (last Apostolic Exarch).

The Apostolic Exarchate of Łemkowszczyzna (Note: Polish: Egzarchat Apostolski Łemkowszczyzny; Latin: Apostolica Exarchia Lemkovszczyznaensis Ucrainorum; Ukrainian: Апостольський Екзархат Лемківщини, romanized: Apostol's'kyy Ekzarkhat Lemkivshchyny) was a short-lived missionary pre-diocesan jurisdiction (exempt, i.e. immediately subject to the Holy See) of the Ukrainian Greek Catholic Church (Byzantine Rite in Ukrainian language), which was created as the Apostolic Administration of Łemkowszczyzna and then promoted as an Apostolic Exarchate. The erection of the jurisdiction was in response to the question of the national character of the Lemko people, a dispute between a pro-Ukrainian party and a Lemko nationalist party. The Eparchy of Przemyśl was pro-Ukrainian while the Polish government was opposed to Ukrainianization. Of a population of 140,000, more than 18,000 Lemko nationalists joined the Orthodox Church in opposition to the Przemyśl Eparchy. At the demand of the Polish government and to curtail losses to the Orthodox, the Holy See established a separate Apostolic Administration for the Lemkos. Poland's defeat and occupation in 1939 allowed for the appointment of the pro-Ukrainian Msgr. Oleksandr Malynovskyi as leader of the jurisdiction when a vacancy occurred in 1941.

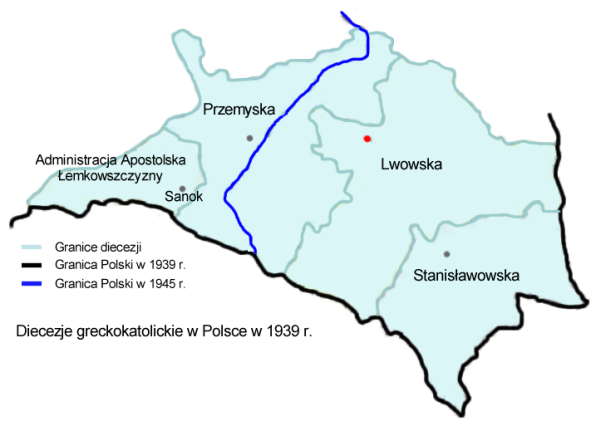
Map of the circumscriptions of the Ukrainian Greek Catholic Church in 1939

== Timeline ==
- February 10, 1934: Established as the Apostolic Administration of Łemkowszczyzna on territory of the 9 western deaneries, that split off from the Ukrainian Catholic Eparchy of Przemyśl, Sambir and Sanok.
- February 1941: Promoted as the Apostolic Exarchate of Łemkowszczyzna.
- De facto abolished (suppressed) by the Polish Communist government after the expulsion of Ukrainians from Poland to the Soviet Union in 1944–1945 and Operation Vistula in July 1947.
- January 16, 1991: Officially suppressed and its territory merged into the Ukrainian Catholic Eparchy of Przemyśl.

== Apostolic Administrators and Apostolic Exarches ==
Apostolic Administrators of Łemkowszczyzna

- Fr. Vasyl Mastsiukh (November 17, 1934 – death March 12, 1936)
- Fr. Yakiv Medvetskyi (July 3, 1936 – death January 27, 1941)
- Msgr. Oleksandr Malynovskyi (February 5, 1941 – February 1941 see below)

Apostolic Exarch of Łemkowszczyzna

- Msgr. Oleksandr Malynovskyi (see above February 1941 – September 1945) (later Vicar general for the Ukrainians in Great Britain)

== Source and External links ==
- GCatholic.org information on the Apostolic Exarchate
- Profile at Catholic Hierarchy ^{[self-published]}
- Shematismus of the Apostolic Exarchate (Ukrainian)
