= Vicariate (Eastern Orthodoxy) =

Administrative sub-unit of an eparchy

A vicariate (Note: Romanian: vicariat; Russian: викариатство, romanized: vikariatstvo; Serbian: викаријатство, romanized: vikarijatstvo; Ukrainian: вікаріат, romanized: vikariat.) is an administrative sub-unit of an eparchy within the Eastern Orthodox Church in which the diocese is under the jurisdiction of a vicar bishop. The vicariate is under jurisdiction of the ruling bishop. In modern day, vicariates are either semi-independent or serve as an auxiliary bishop to their direct bishop. They are also used to serve diaspora populations.

== See also ==
- Exarchate
