= Melkite Greek Catholic Patriarchal Exarchate of Kuwait =

Eastern Catholic missionary jurisdiction in Kuwait

Patriarchal Exarchate of Kuwait (Melkite Greek)

Location
- Country: Kuwait
- Headquarters: Syria

Statistics
- Population: (as of 2005); 800
- Parishes: 1

Information
- Denomination: Melkite Greek Catholic Church
- Rite: Byzantine Rite
- Established: 1972

Current leadership
- Pope: Leo XIV
- Patriarch: Youssef Absi
- Patriarchal Exarch: Boutros Gharib

Website
- http://www.rcckw.com/

Melkite (Greek) Catholic Patriarchal Exarchate of Kuwait (informally Kuwait of the (Greek)-Melkites) is a Patriarchal Exarchate (Eastern Catholic missionary pre-diocesan jurisdiction, not entitled to a titular bishop) of the Melkite Greek Catholic Church sui iuris (Byzantine rite in Greek language).

It is immediately subject to the Patriarch of Antioch of the Melkites, not part of his or any other ecclesiastical province, and in Rome depends on the Congregation for the Oriental Churches.

It is currently governed by Exarch Boutros Gharib.

== Territory and statistics ==
The Exarchate extends its jurisdiction over the Melkite Greek Catholic faithful Catholic in Kuwait.

It comprises a single parish in Kuwait City, which had 800 baptized Melkite Catholics in 2005.

== History ==
From the second half of the twentieth century was formed in Kuwait a community of Melkite Greek Catholics, mostly Arab workers of the nearby region. The church service was assured, at least initially, by Latin apostolic vicars. It was governed as a Patriarchal Vicariate of Antioch.

On 25 March 1972 the Patriarch Maximos V Hakim erected the Patriarchal Exarchate, naming as the first Exarch Archimandrite Basile Kanakri of the clergy of Damascus, the incumbent patriarchal vicar, who was succeeded, on 9 August 2002, by Boutros Gharib, clergyman of Beirut.

== Ordinaries ==
Patriarchal Exarchs

- Archimandrite Basil(ios) Kanakri (25 March 1972 - 2002 withdrawn), previously Patriarchal Exarch of Iraq of the Greek-Melkites (Iraq) (1971 – 1978) and last Patriarchal Vicar of Kuwait of the Greek-Melkites (Kuwait) (1972.03.25 – 1991)
- Archimandrite Boutros Gharib (since 9 August 2002 - ...)

== Sources and external links ==
- http://www.rcckw.com/
- http://www.pgc-lb.org/fre/melkite_greek_catholic_church/Patriarchal-Exarchate-in-Kuwait
- GCatholic with incumbent bio links
