= Ukrainian Catholic Apostolic Exarchate of Belarus =

Former Eastern Catholic missionary jurisdiction in Belarus (1940-1942)

The Ukrainian Catholic Apostolic Exarchate of Belarus (or Belarus of the Ukrainians) was a short-lived (1940–42) Apostolic Exarchate (Eastern Catholic pre-diocesan jurisdiction) of the particular Ukrainian Greek Catholic Church sui iuris (Byzantine Rite in Ukrainian language) in the Soviet Belarus SSR.

A new Belarusian Greek Catholic Church was founded in 1994 and it's currently under the apostolic administrator Sergiusz Gajek.

== History ==
- Established 1940 as Apostolic Exarchate of Belarus, without direct Eastern Catholic precursor

suppressed in 1942, having had a single incumbent (Ukrainian Rite) :

- Father Antoni Niemancewicz (1940 – 1942), no other prelature.

== Sources and external links ==
- GCatholic
