= Syriac Catholic Apostolic Exarchate of Venezuela =

Syriac Catholic ecclesiastical jurisdiction in Venezuela

Apostolic Exarchate of Venezuela (Syriac) Exarchatus Apostolicus pro fidelibus ritus Antiocheni Syrorum in Venetiola

Location
- Country: Venezuela
- Ecclesiastical province: Immediately exempt to the Holy See

Statistics
- Population: (as of 2009); 5,000 Syriac Catholics
- Parishes: 11

Information
- Denomination: Catholic Church
- Sui iuris church: Syriac Catholic Church
- Rite: West Syriac Rite
- Established: 22 June 2001 (25 years ago)
- Cathedral: Catedral Nuestra Señora de La Asunción

Current leadership
- Pope: Leo XIV
- Exarch: Vacant

The Syriac Catholic Apostolic Exarchate of Venezuela is a Syriac Catholic Church missionary ecclesiastical territory or apostolic exarchate of the Catholic Church in Venezuela. It is exempt directly to the Holy See (specifically the Roman Congregation for the Oriental Churches) and not part of any ecclesiastical province.

Its cathedral is the Catedral Católica Siria de Nuestra Señora de la Asunción (dedicated to the Assumption of Mary), in the episcopal see of Maracay, Aragua, Venezuela.

== History ==
Pope John Paul II established the Apostolic Exarchate of Venezuela for Syriac Catholics on 22 June 2001.

== Ordinaries ==
- Denys Antoine Chahda (28 June 2001 – 13 September 2001), later Archeparch (Archbishop) of Aleppo of the Syriacs (Syria) (2001.09.13 – ...)
- Iwannis Louis Awad (17 May 2003 – retired 1 March 2011), emeritate as Titular Bishop of Zeugma in Syria (2003.05.17 – ...)
- Timoteo Hikmat Beylouni (1 March 2011 – 30 July 2026), Titular Bishop of Sabrata (2011.03.01 – 2026.07.30)

== See also ==
- Catholic Church in Venezuela

== Sources and external links ==
- GCatholic with incumbent biography links
