= Serigene =

Serigene is an Ancient city and former bishopric in Roman Syria, now a Latin Catholic titular see.

Its modern location is Isriyë, in present Syria.

== History ==
Serigene was important enough in the Late Roman province of Syria Euphratensis Secunda to be one of the suffragans of its capital Sergiopolis's Metropolitan Archbishopric. However, its importance decreased over time.

== Titular see ==
The diocese was nominally restored in 1994 as a Latin Catholic titular bishopric.

It has had the following incumbents, of the lowest (episcopal) rank :

- Titular Bishop Kajetán Matoušek (August 29, 1949 – death October 21, 1994), as Auxiliary Bishop of Prague (Praha) (the Czech Republic) (retired June 5, 1992)
