= Denys Antoine Chahda =

Syrian Syriac Catholic archbishop (born 1946)

Most Reverend Denys Antoine Chahda
- Archbishop of Aleppo
- Church: Syriac Catholic Church
- Appointed: 13 September 2001
- Installed: 16 December 2001
- Predecessor: Raboula Antoine Beylouni
- Previous post: Apostolic Exarch of Venezuela for the Syriac Catholics (2001)

Orders
- Ordination: 1 July 1973
- Consecration: 16 December 2001 by Ignatius Peter VIII Abdalahad

Personal details
- Born: Antoine Chahda; 19 August 1946 (age 80) Aleppo, First Syrian Republic
- Education: Charfet Seminary, Holy Spirit University of Kaslik

Denys Antoine Chahda (born 19 August 1946) is a Syrian Syriac Catholic hierarch, who has served as the Archbishop of Aleppo since 2001. Previously he served a short time as Apostolic Exarch of Venezuela for the Syriac Catholics in 2001.

== Early life and ministry ==
Antoine Chahda was born in Aleppo, Syria, in 1946. He began his religious studies at the Charfet Seminary in Lebanon and later continued his education at the Holy Spirit University of Kaslik in Lebanon. He was ordained to the priesthood on 1 July 1973 for the Archeparchy of Aleppo.

Following his ordination, he served the Syriac Catholic community in various capacities, including a significant period serving the diaspora in Venezuela (since 1979). On 28 June 2001, he was appointed Apostolic Exarch of Venezuela for the Syriac Catholics, a newly established jurisdiction for Syriac Catholics in that country.

== Episcopal ministry ==
On 13 September 2001, the Synod of Bishops of the Syriac Catholic Church elected him as the Archbishop of Aleppo, following the transfer of his predecessor, Raboula Antoine Beylouni, to the patriarchal curia. Pope John Paul II confirmed the election on 21 November 2001. He was consecrated as a bishop on 16 December 2001 by Patriarch Ignatius Peter VIII Abdalahad.

As Archbishop, Chahda has been a prominent voice for the Christian community in Syria, particularly during the Syrian civil war. He has frequently advocated for international aid and peace initiatives, collaborating with organizations like Aid to the Church in Need (ACN). In 2018, he participated in the "Candles for Peace in Syria" campaign, highlighting the plight of children in Aleppo.

In 2010, he participated in the Special Assembly of the Synod of Bishops for the Middle East, where he spoke on the importance of Christian-Muslim dialogue and the challenges of emigration facing the youth in the region.

On 12 July 2019, he was additionally appointed a Patriarchal Administrator of the Syriac Catholic Archeparchy of Hasakah-Nisibis, where he served until 17 October 2019.
