= Exarch =

Former political and military office; now an ecclesiastical office

An exarch (/ˈɛksɑːrk/) is an official in various jurisdictions (administrative, military, ecclesiastical) both historical and modern.

== Political exarchs ==
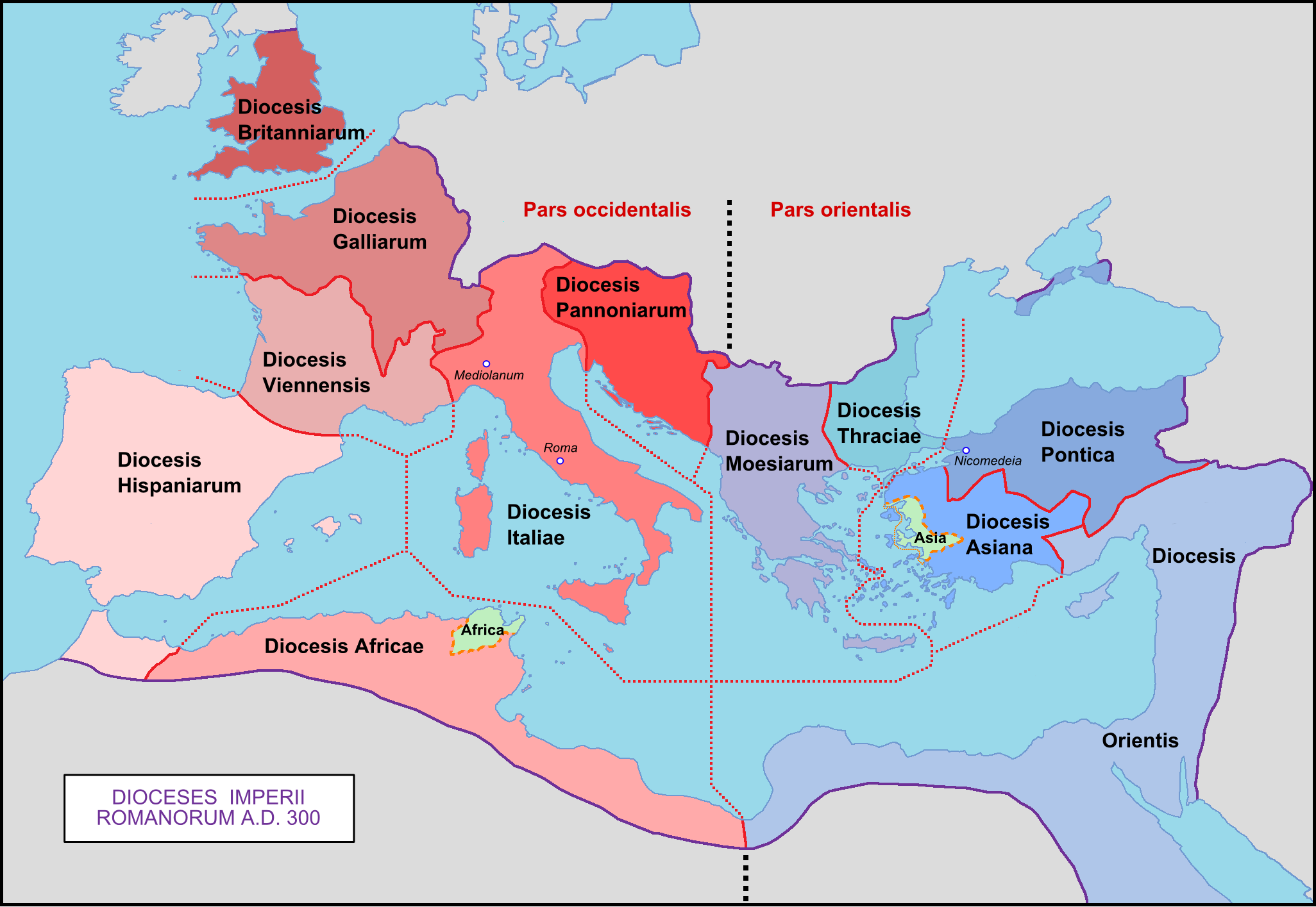
Original dioceses of the Roman Empire, created by emperor Diocletian (r. 284–305), and headed by vicars (exarchs)

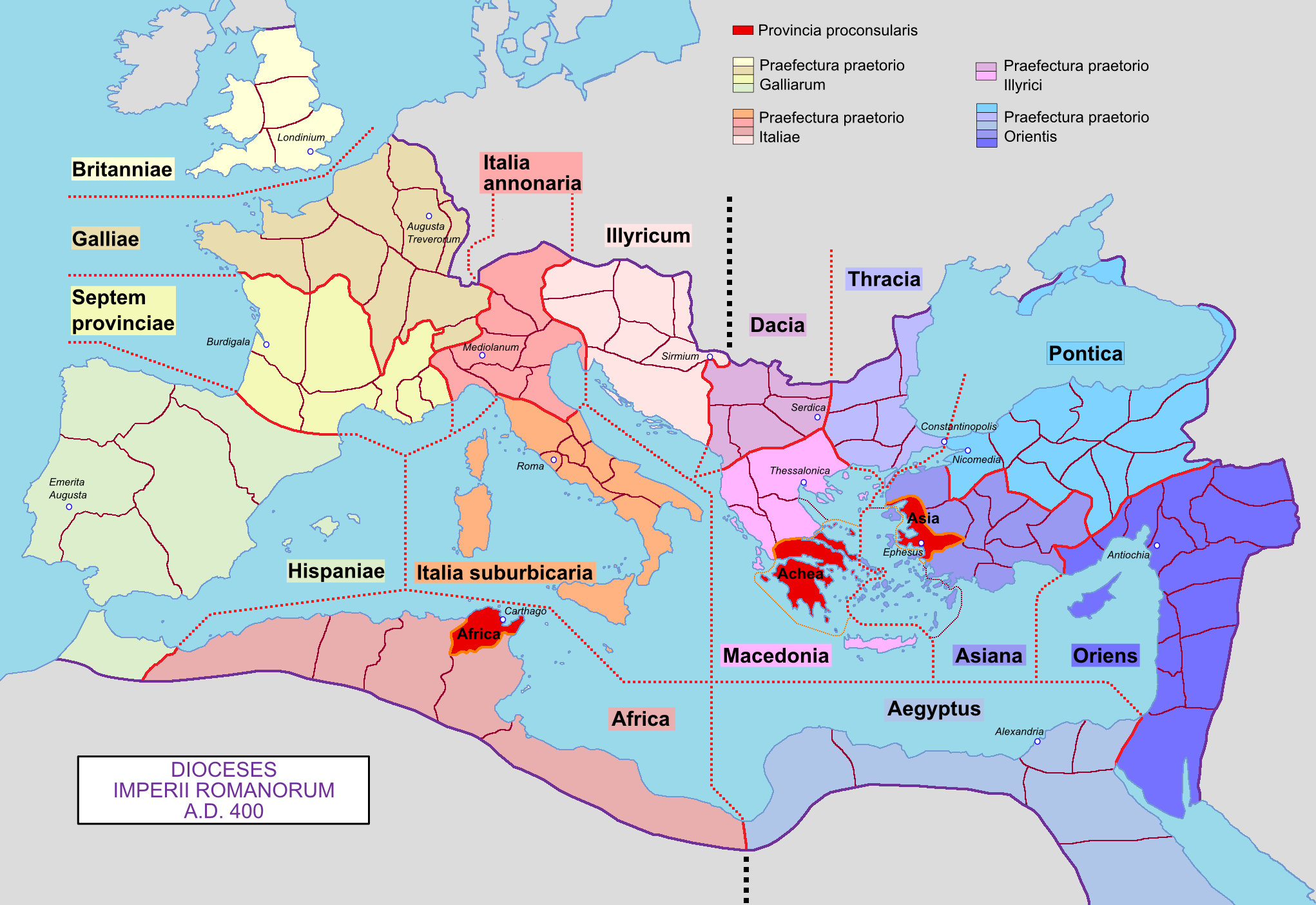
Later dioceses of the Roman Empire, around 400 AD

In the late Roman Empire and early Byzantine Empire, an exarch was a regional governor. From the end of the 3rd or early 4th century, every Roman imperial diocese was headed by a civilian governor titled as vicar (Latin: vicarius), who was also called "exarch" in eastern parts of the Empire, where the Greek language and the use of Greek terminology was predominant, even though Latin was the language of the imperial administration from the provincial level up until the 440s (Greek translations were sent out with the official Latin text). In Greek texts, the Latin title is spelled βικάριος (bikarios).

Since the second half of the 6th century, in the administrative structure of the Byzantine Empire a new type of regional governors was introduced, with extended, both civilian and military powers. Such governors were also called exarchs, and their jurisdictions came to be known as exarchates. Two vast imperial exarchates were thus formed in the western regions of the empire: the Exarchate of Ravenna and the Exarchate of Africa, both headed by imperial exarchs with extensive viceroyal powers.

The creation of such a powerful office was a response to the need of strengthening imperial authority in remote regions of the empire. It was also part of the overall process of unification of civil and military offices, initiated in early form by emperor Justinian I, which would lead eventually to the creation of the thematic system by either the emperor Heraclius or Constans II.

After the dissolution of the Western Empire in the late fifth century, the Eastern Roman Empire remained stable through the beginning of the Middle Ages and retained the ability for future expansion. Justinian I reconquered North Africa, Italy, Dalmatia and finally parts of Spain for the Eastern Roman Empire. However, this put an incredible strain on the Empire's limited resources. Subsequent emperors would not surrender the re-conquered land to remedy the situation. Thus the stage was set for Emperor Maurice to establish the Exarchates to deal with the constantly evolving situation of the provinces.

In Italy the Lombards were the main opposition to Byzantine power. In North Africa the Amazigh or Berber princes were ascendant due to Roman weakness outside the coastal cities. The problems associated with many enemies on various fronts (the Visigoths in Spain, the Slavs and Avars in the Balkans, the Sassanid Persians in the Middle East, and the Amazigh in North Africa) forced the imperial government to decentralize and devolve power to the former provinces.

The term Exarch most commonly refers to the Exarch of Italy, who governed the area of Italy and Dalmatia, still remaining under Byzantine control after the Lombard invasion of 568. The exarchate's seat was at Ravenna, whence it is known as the "Exarchate of Ravenna". Ravenna remained the seat of the Exarch until the revolt of 727 over Iconoclasm. Thereafter, the growing menace of the Lombards and the split between eastern and western Christendom that Iconoclasm caused made the position of the Exarch more and more untenable. The last Exarch was killed by the Lombards in 751.

A second exarchate was created by Maurice to administer northern Africa, formerly a separate praetorian prefecture, the islands of the western Mediterranean and the Byzantine possessions in Spain. The capital of the Exarchate of Africa was Carthage. An emperor of the Eastern Roman Empire, Heraclius, was the son of the exarch of Africa before Heraclius replaced the usurper emperor Phocas in 610. Phocas had revolted under emperor Maurice who had appointed Heraclius' father as exarch of Africa. The exarchate proved both financially and militarily strong, and survived until the Arab Muslim conquest of Carthage in 698.

== Ecclesiastical exarchs ==
In the Eastern Christian denominations (Eastern Orthodox, Oriental Orthodox and Eastern Catholic), the term exarch has three distinct uses: a metropolitan who holds the office of exarch is the deputy of a patriarch and holds authority over bishops of the designated ecclesiastical region (thus, a position between that of patriarch and regular metropolitan); or an auxiliary or titular bishop appointed to be exarch over a group of the faithful not yet large enough or organized enough to be constituted an eparchy or diocese (thus the equivalent of a vicar apostolic); or a priest or deacon who is appointed by a bishop as his executive representative in various fields of diocesan administration (in the Byzantine Empire, executive exarchs were usually collecting diocesan revenues for local bishops).

=== Early tradition ===
The term 'exarch' entered ecclesiastical language at first for a metropolitan (an archbishop) with jurisdiction not only for the area that was his as a metropolitan, but also over other metropolitans within local political dioceses. Since imperial vicarius (governor of a political diocese) was often called "exarch" in eastern, Greek-speaking parts of the Empire, it became customary for the metropolitans of the diocesan capitals (Ephesus in the Diocese of Asia, Heraclea in the Diocese of Thrace and Caesarea in the Diocese of Pontus) also to use the title "exarch" in order to emphasize their precedence and primatial status over other metropolitans within local political dioceses.

The Council of Chalcedon (451), which gave special authority to the see of Constantinople as being "the residence of the emperor and the Senate", in its canons spoke of diocesan "exarchs", placing all metropolitans in dioceses of Asia, Thrace and Pontus (including metropolitans-exarchs of Ephesus, Heraclea and Caesarea) under the jurisdiction of the Archbishop of Constantinople. Metropolitans-exarchs of Ephesus tried to resist the supreme jurisdiction of Constantinople, but eventually failed since imperial government supported the creation of a centralized Patriarchate.

When the proposed government of universal Christendom by five patriarchal sees (Rome, Constantinople, Alexandria, Antioch and Jerusalem, known as the pentarchy), under the auspices of a single universal empire, was formulated in the legislation of Emperor Justinian I (527–565), especially in his Novella 131 (De regulis ecclesiasticis etc., chapter III), and received formal ecclesiastical sanction at the Council in Trullo (692), the name "patriarch" became the official one for the heads of major autocephalous churches, and the title of "exarch" was further demoted by naming all metropolitans as "patriarchal exarchs" in their ecclesiastical provinces. The advance of Constantinople put an end to privileges of three older, original exarchates, which fell back to the state of ordinary metropolitan sees.

Local ecclesiastical development in some regions also included the title of exarch. Since the Church of Cyprus was declared autocephalous (431), its Primate received the title of Exarch of Cyprus. On a similar principle the Archbishop of Mount Sinai and Raithu is an exarch, though in this case, as in that of Cyprus, modern Eastern Orthodox usage generally prefers the title "Archbishop".

=== Eastern Orthodox Churches ===
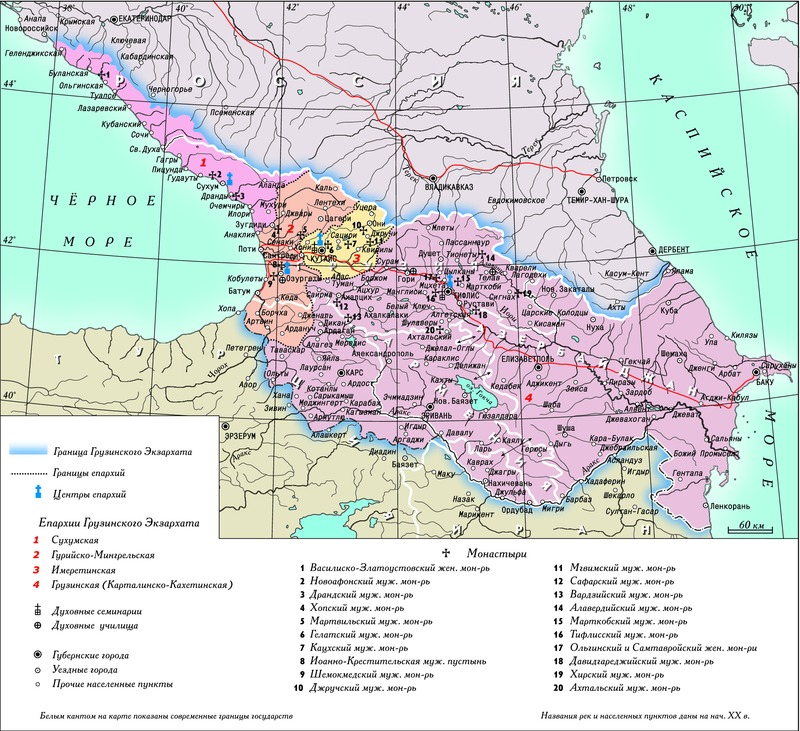
Georgian Exarchate in the 19th century

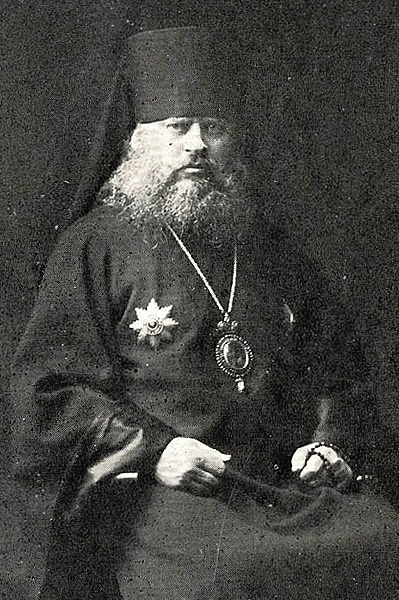
Metropolitan Platon (Rozhdestvensky), last Exarch of Georgia (1915–1917) and first Exarch of Caucasus (1917–1918)

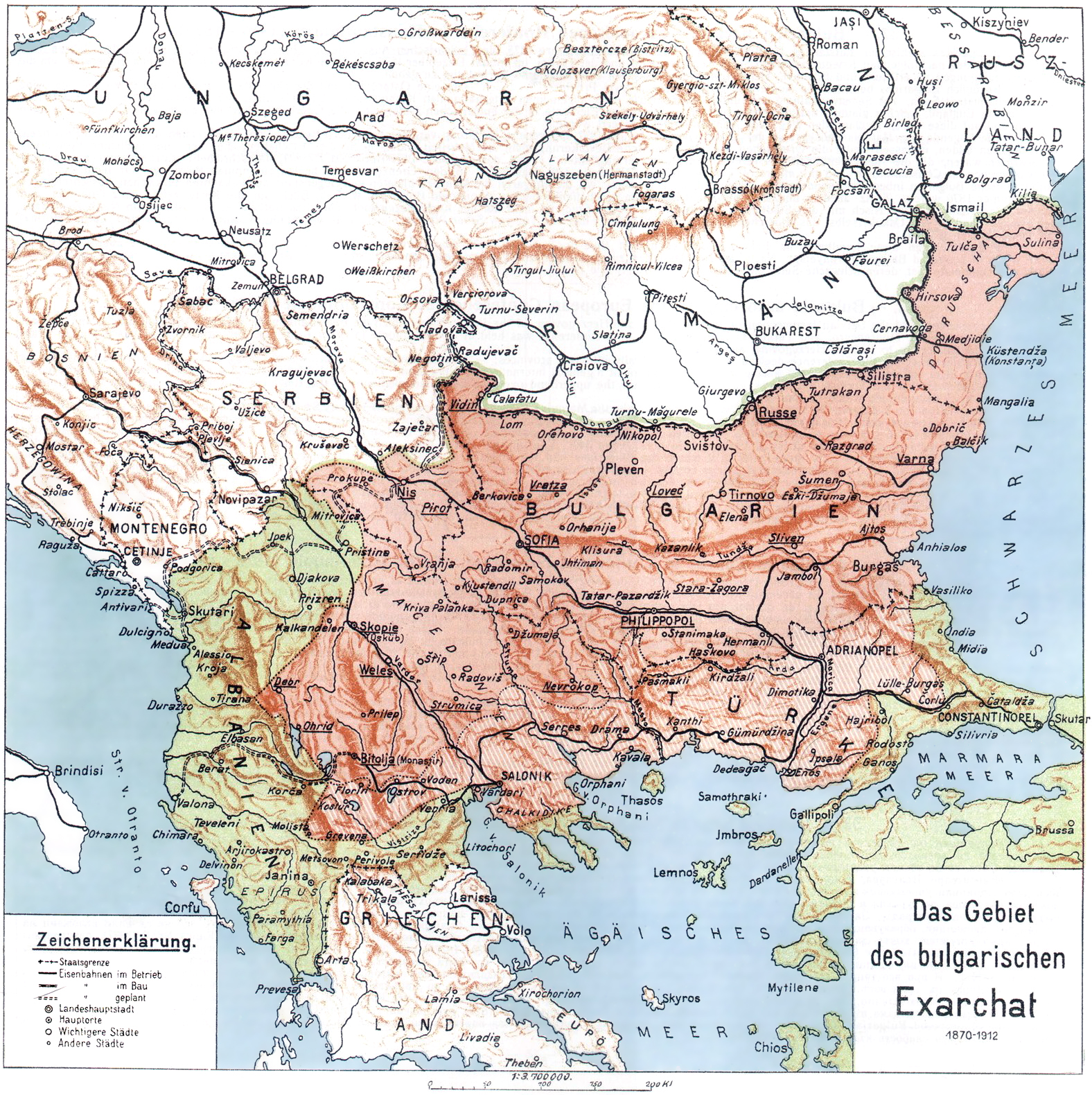
Map of the Bulgarian Exarchate (1870–1913)

In modern ecclesiastical practice of the Eastern Orthodox Church, the title of exarch was often used to designate the highest hierarchical office under the rank of patriarch. When Russian Patriarch Adrian of Moscow died in 1700, Emperor Peter the Great abolished the patriarchal office and appointed Metropolitan Stefan Yavorsky as exarch and head of the Most Holy Synod of the Russian Orthodox Church.

After Imperial Russia annexed Georgia (the eastern part in 1801, and the western part in 1810), the ancient Georgian Orthodox Church (autocephalous since 750, whose head was since 1008 styled Catholicos-Patriarchs) was reorganized into the Georgian Exarchate, and the newly appointed Exarch of Georgia (since 1817 always an ethnic Russian) sat in the Russian Holy Synod at St. Petersburg. Since the entire region of the Caucasus fell under Russian rule, the jurisdiction of the Georgian Exarchate was expanded, encompassing the territories of modern-day Georgia, Armenia and Azerbaijan. On 7 April 1917, the Georgian Patriarchate was restored for the Archbishops of Mtsheta and Tbilisi, with the style Catholicos-Patriarch of All Georgia, and the title Exarch of Georgia was extinguished, but only for the Georgian part of the Exarchate. The Russian Orthodox Church and its exarch Platon (Rozhdestvensky) kept their jurisdiction over non-Georgian parts of the Caucasian region, and for those territories the Caucasian Exarchate of the Russian Orthodox Church was created in the summer of 1917, with metropolitan Platon as Exarch of the Caucasus. In the spring of 1918, he was succeeded by metropolitan Cyril (Smirnov) as new Exarch of the Caucasus, but after his transfer to another post in the spring of 1920 no new exarch was appointed.

On 28 February 1870 the twenty-year-old struggle between Greeks and Bulgarians for control of the Orthodox Church in Bulgaria culminated when the Ottoman Sultan Abdulaziz created an independent Bulgarian ecclesiastical organization, known as the Bulgarian Exarchate. The Orthodox Church in Bulgaria had now become independent of the Greek-dominated Ecumenical Patriarchate of Constantinople. The Bulgarian Exarch, who resided in Constantinople, became the most famous bearer of the title of exarch; his adherents throughout region were called exarchists, as opposed to the Greek patriarchists. The ensuing struggle, waged especially in Macedonia, was not only religious but had a conspicuous political dimension of a contention between competing Greek and Bulgarian national aims. For more information see Bulgarian Exarchate and Bulgarian Orthodox Church.

In 1921, eparchies of the Russian Orthodox Church in Ukraine were reorganized as the Ukrainian Exarchate of the Russian Orthodox Church, headed by the patriarchal exarch with his seat in Kiev (Kyiv). The Ukrainian Exarchate existed until 1990 when it was granted a higher degree of ecclesiastical autonomy within the Moscow Patriarchate. In 1989, an autonomous Belarusian Exarchate of the Russian Orthodox Church was formed, with jurisdiction over eparchies in Belarus.

During the 20th century, the pentarchy-number principle, already abandoned in the case of Bulgaria (10th century), Serbia (14th century) and Russia (16th century), gave way to the desire of the now politically independent Orthodox nations to see their sovereignty reflected in ecclesiastical autonomy – autocephaly – and the symbolic title to crown it: a 'national' Patriarch. For example, Bulgarian Exarchate was raised to the rank of Patriarchate in 1953.

In the Eastern Orthodox Church, the office of exarch can be also given to a special deputy of a Patriarch, with jurisdiction over a community outside the home territory of the Patriarchate. Thus, in the United States there are Exarchs representing, among others, the Serbian, Romanian, Bulgarian and Jerusalem Patriarchs. The style of the Exarchs of the Patriarchate of Jerusalem is "Exarch of the Holy Sepulcher".

The Mexican Orthodox parishes in five deaneries (Mexico City, D.F., State of Mexico, State of Jalisco, State of Veracruz and State of Chiapas) of the Orthodox Church in America are governed as the "Exarchate of Mexico", currently under the leadership of Bishop Alejo of Mexico City.

The third officer of the court of the Ecumenical Patriarch of Constantinople, who examines marriage cases (analogous to the Catholic defensor matrimonii), is called the Exarch.

=== Oriental Orthodox Churches ===
The Oriental Orthodox Patriarch of Antioch currently has under his authority an Exarch in India, known by the ancient title Maphrian, although he is popularly referred to as Catholicos. This is not to be confused with the autocephalous Catholicate of the East, which is also located in India.

=== Latin Church ===
Historically, there have been a very few cases of the civil title of Exarch granted by the civil authority to prelates of the Latin Church, as when Emperor Frederick I named the Archbishop of Lyon as "most glorious exarch of the sacred palace of Burgundy", i.e., of the Kingdom of Arles, in 1157.

However, the ecclesiastical title of Exarch has disappeared in the Western Catholic Church, being replaced by the terms "Primate" (ranking above metropolitan archbishop) and "Apostolic Vicar" (ranking below suffragan bishop).

=== Modern Eastern Catholic Churches ===
In Eastern Catholic Churches (of Eastern tradition but in full communion with the Bishop of Rome, the Pope), the ecclesiastical title of Exarch is in common use, just as with its Orthodox counterparts.

These Churches are, in general, not identified with a particular liturgical rite. Thus, no fewer than fourteen of them use the same Byzantine Rite, mostly in one or other of only two languages, Greek and Church Slavonic, but they maintain their distinct identities. Because of population shifts, half or so of these Churches have not just exarchates but full-scale eparchies (bishoprics) or even archeparchies (archdioceses) outside their original territory.

==== Apostolic exarchs ====
Apostolic exarch is usually a consecrated bishop of a titular see to whom the Pope, as Bishop of the Roman See of the Apostle Peter, has entrusted the pastoral care of the faithful of an autonomous Eastern Catholic particular Church sui iuris in an area, not raised to the rank of eparchy (diocese), that is situated outside the home territory of an Eastern Catholic Church. The office of apostolic exarch thus corresponds to what in the Latin Church is called an apostolic vicar. Apostolic exarchates are generally exempt (immediately subject to the Holy See), with limited oversight by the patriarch, major archbishop or metropolitan in chief of the particular Eastern Church. If there is no metropolitan in a particular Eastern Catholic church, apostolic exarchates in their territories are directly subjected to Rome. For example, the Byzantine Catholic Apostolic Exarchate of Serbia belongs to the Byzantine Catholic Church of Croatia and Serbia, but since there is no metropolitan in that church, the Apostolic Exarch of Serbia is directly subjected to the Holy See.

==== Patriarchal exarchs ====
A patriarchal exarch is appointed in those Eastern Catholic churches whose head is styled as patriarch. This office is often (not always) given to a consecrated bishop of a titular see. Their appointments are limited to the traditional territory of their church, with main task of governing the region not yet raised to the rank of eparchy (diocese). They may be suffragan to an archdiocese or archeparchy of the Eastern Catholic Church, or be immediately subject to the Patriarch.

==== Archiepiscopal exarchs ====
Archiepiscopal exarch is appointed in those Eastern Catholic churches whose head is styled as Major Archbishop. The office of archiepiscopal exarch is also usually given to a consecrated bishop of a titular see. Appointment of archiepiscopal exarchs is limited to the traditional territory of their particular church. They also may be suffragans to an archdiocese or archeparchy of their Eastern Catholic Church, or be immediately subject to the Major Archbishop.

==== Coadjutor exarchs ====
In particular cases, usually because of illness or some other problem, an exarch of any rank can be assisted by the appointment of a colleague who is called coadjutor exarch. The position of coadjutor exarch towards his superior exarch is similar to the position of Latin coadjutor bishop towards his superior diocesan bishop. Coadjutor exarchs are appointed with rights of succession. For example, in 1993 titular Bishop Christo Proykov of Briula was appointed Coadjutor to Apostolic Exarch of Sofia, Methodius Stratiev, and when the latter died in 1995 the coadjutor exarch succeeded him as the new Apostolic Exarch.

==== Auxiliary exarchs ====
In practice, exarch of any rank can be additionally assisted by an auxiliary exarch, who is appointed in order to help the exarch in administration of his exarchate. Position of auxiliary exarch towards his superior exarch is similar to position of Latin auxiliary bishop towards his superior diocesan bishop. Auxiliary exarchs are appointed without the rights of succession.

=== List of Eastern Catholic exarchates ===
The following Eastern Catholic exarchates can be found in the 2006 Annuario Pontificio and newer sources. The Apostolic Exarchates are exempt, i.e. immediately subject to the Holy See, rather than to their Patriarch or other head of the particular Church

Byzantine Rite

- Greek Byzantine Catholic Church:
  - Greek Catholic Apostolic Exarchate of Greece in Athens
  - Greek Catholic Apostolic Exarchate of Istanbul (alias Constantinople; Turkey)
- Melkite (Greek) Catholic Church:
  - Melkite Catholic Apostolic Exarchate of Argentina
  - Melkite Catholic Apostolic Exarchate of Venezuela
- Russian Greek Catholic Church:
  - Russian Catholic Apostolic Exarchate of Harbin (China)
  - Russian Catholic Apostolic Exarchate of Russia
- Ruthenian Greek Catholic Church:
  - Ruthenian Catholic Apostolic Exarchate of Czech Republic
  - Exarchate of Saints Cyril and Methodius of Toronto (since 2022)
- Ukrainian Greek Catholic Church:
  - Ukrainian Catholic Apostolic Exarchate of Germany and Scandinavia for Germany and Scandinavia (Finland, Norway, Sweden, and Denmark)
  - Ukrainian Catholic Apostolic Exarchate of Italy

Antiochian Rite

- Maronite Church:
  - Maronite Catholic Apostolic Exarchate of Colombia
- Syriac (Syrian) Catholic Church :
  - Syrian Catholic Apostolic Exarchate for Canada
  - Syriac Catholic Apostolic Exarchate of Venezuela

Armenian Rite

- Armenian Catholic Church:
  - Armenian Catholic Apostolic Exarchate of Latin America and Mexico

==== Patriarchal Exarchates ====
Armenian Rite

- Armenian Catholic Church:
  - Armenian Catholic Patriarchal Exarchate of Damascus (Syria)
  - Armenian Catholic Patriarchal Exarchate of Jerusalem and Amman (Palestine, Israel and Jordan)

Byzantine Rite

- Melkite (Greek) Catholic Church:
  - Melkite Catholic Patriarchal Exarchate of Iraq
  - Melkite Catholic Patriarchal Exarchate of Istanbul (Turkey)
  - Melkite Catholic Patriarchal Exarchate of Kuwait

Antiochian Rite

- Maronite Church:
  - Maronite Catholic Patriarchal Exarchate of Jerusalem and Palestine (Palestine, Israel)
  - Maronite Catholic Patriarchal Exarchate of Jordan
- Syriac (Syrian) Catholic Church:
  - Syriac Catholic Patriarchal Exarchate of Bassorah and the Gulf (Iraq, Kuwait etc.)
  - Syriac Catholic Patriarchal Exarchate of Jerusalem (Palestine, Israel and Jordan)
  - Syriac Catholic Patriarchal Exarchate of Turkey

==== Archiepiscopal Exarchates ====
Byzantine Rite

- Ukrainian (Greek) Catholic Church, in Ukraine:
  - Ukrainian Catholic Archiepiscopal Exarchate of Donetsk
  - Ukrainian Catholic Archiepiscopal Exarchate of Kharkiv
  - Ukrainian Catholic Archiepiscopal Exarchate of Lutsk
  - Ukrainian Catholic Archiepiscopal Exarchate of Odesa
  - Ukrainian Catholic Archiepiscopal Exarchate of Krym (Crimea), on the Russian-annexed Crimea, with cathedral see at Simferopol

==== Former Eastern Catholic Exarchates ====
(probably still incomplete)

===== Former Eastern Catholic Exarchates in the Old World =====
in Europe – Byzantine Rite

- Bulgarian Catholic Apostolic Exarchate of Sofia (1926–2019, elevated to Eparchy in 2019)
- Greek Catholic Apostolic Exarchate of Turkey of Europe (now of Istanbul)
- Hungarian Catholic Apostolic Exarchate of Miskolc (Hungary; promoted to eparchy)
- Apostolic Exarchate of Łemkowszczyzna
- Ukrainian Catholic Archiepiscopal Exarchate of Donetsk-Kharkiv (Ukraine; split in both named cities)
- Ukrainian Catholic Archiepiscopal Exarchate of Lutsk-Volyn (Ukraine; split in ?)
- Ukrainian Catholic Archiepiscopal Exarchate of Odesa-Crimea (Ukraine; split in both named parts)
- Apostolic Exarchate of Serbia and Montenegro (2003–2013)
- Byzantine Catholic Apostolic Exarchate of Serbia (2013–2018, elevated as Eparchy in 2018)
- Apostolic Exarchate of Macedonia (2001–2018, elevated as an Eparchy in 2018)

in Asia – Armenian Rite

- Armenian Catholic Patriarchal Exarchate of Jerusalem (Palestine, Israel and Jordan, now 'Jerusalem and Amman')
- Armenian Catholic Patriarchal Exarchate of Syria (suppressed)

in Asia – Antiochian Rite

- Syrian Catholic Patriarchal Exarchate of Lebanon (national; suppressed)
- Syro-Malankara Catholic Exarchate in the United States (USA; promoted Eparchy of St. Mary, Queen of Peace, of the United States of America and Canada)

in Asia – Syro-Oriental Rite

- Syro-Malabar Apostolic Exarchate of Chanda (India; promoted eparchy)

in Africa – Alexandrian Rite

- Apostolic Exarchate of Addis Abbeba (Ethiopic Catholic; promoted Metropolitanate sui iuris)
- Apostolic Exarchate of Asmara (Eritrean Catholic)

in Africa – Antiochian Rite

- Maronite Catholic Apostolic Exarchate of Western and Central Africa

===== Former Eastern Catholic Exarchates in the New World =====
in the Americas – Antiochian Rite

- Maronite Catholic Apostolic Exarchate of the USA

in the Americas – Armenian Rite

- Armenian Catholic Apostolic Exarchate of Latin America and Mexico
- Armenian Catholic Apostolic Exarchate of the USA and Canada

in the Americas – Byzantine Rite

- Romanian Catholic Apostolic Exarchate of the USA (US and Canada)
- Ruthenian Catholic Apostolic Exarchate of the USA
- Melkite Catholic Apostolic Exarchate of the USA
- Ukrainian Catholic Apostolic Exarchate of Canada
- Ukrainian Catholic Apostolic Exarchate of Central Canada
- Ukrainian Catholic Apostolic Exarchate of Eastern Canada
- Ukrainian Catholic Apostolic Exarchate of Edmonton (Canada)
- Ukrainian Catholic Apostolic Exarchate of Manitoba (Canada)
- Ukrainian Catholic Apostolic Exarchate of Saskatoon (Canada)
- Ukrainian Catholic Apostolic Exarchate of Stamford (US)
- Ukrainian Catholic Apostolic Exarchate of Toronto (Canada)
- Ukrainian Catholic Apostolic Exarchate of the USA
- Ukrainian Catholic Apostolic Exarchate of Western Canada

in the Americas – Syro-Oriental Rite

- Chaldean Catholic Apostolic Exarchate of the USA
- Syro-Malabar Catholic Church:
  - Syro-Malabar Catholic Apostolic Exarchate of Canada

== Sources ==
- Barnes, Timothy D. (1982). The New Empire of Diocletian and Constantine. Cambridge, MS: Harvard University Press. ISBN 978-0-674-61126-9.
- Cases, Laurent J. (2019). "Language and Administrative Structures: The "Vicarii" under Diocletian and Constantine (297-315)". Historia: Zeitschrift für Alte Geschichte. 68 (3): 353–367. JSTOR 45184777.
- Cosentino, Salvatore, ed. (2021). A Companion to Byzantine Italy. Boston-Leiden: Brill. ISBN 978-90-04-30770-4.
- Fortescue, Adrian (1908). The Orthodox Eastern Church. London: Catholic Truth Society.
- Meyendorff, John (1989). Imperial unity and Christian divisions: The Church 450-680 A.D. Crestwood, NY: St. Vladimir's Seminary Press. ISBN 9780881410563.
- Nedungatt, George, ed. (2002). A Guide to the Eastern Code: A Commentary on the Code of Canons of the Eastern Churches. Rome: Oriental Institute Press. ISBN 9788872103364.
- Ostrogorsky, George (1956). History of the Byzantine State. Oxford: Basil Blackwell.
- Wozniak, Frank E. (1981). "East Rome, Ravenna and Western Illyricum: 454-536 A.D." Historia: Zeitschrift für Alte Geschichte. 30 (3): 351–382.
