= Melkite Greek Catholic Patriarchal Exarchate of Istanbul =

Eastern Catholic ecclesiastical jurisdiction in Turkey

Patriarchal Exarchate of Istanbul (Melkite Greek Catholic)

Location
- Country: Turkey
- Ecclesiastical province: Patriarchate of Antioch

Statistics
- Parishes: 1

Information
- Denomination: Melkite Greek Catholic Church
- Rite: Byzantine Rite

Current leadership
- Pope: Leo XIV
- Patriarch: Youssef Absi
- Patriarchal Exarch: Sede vacante

Melkite Greek Catholic Patriarchal Exarchate of Istanbul is an immediate Patriarchal Exarchate of the Melkite Greek Catholic Church in Istanbul. It reports directly to the Melkite Patriarch of Antioch.

== History ==
Since 1946, Melkite Parish in Istanbul (Constantinople) was administrated by priest Maximos Mardelli (born 1913 – died 2000) who was appointed Patriarchal Vicar (exarch) in Istanbul, as representative of Melkite Patriarch Maximos IV Sayegh of Antioch. Exarch Maximos was elevated to the honour of Archimandrite in 1953 for his successful church administration. During Anti-Greek riots in 1955 (Istanbul pogrom), the Melkite Church building in Istanbul was destroyed. Because Archimandrite Maximos was not a Turkish citizen, he had to leave Istanbul and went to the United States.
