= Raboula Antoine Beylouni =

Lebanese Syriac Catholic archbishop (born 1930)

The Most Reverend Denys Raboula Antoine Beylouni
- Church: Syriac Catholic Church
- Archdiocese: Syriac Catholic Patriarchate of Antioch
- Appointed: 16 September 2000
- Term ended: 1 March 2011
- Previous post: Archbishop of Syriac Catholic Archeparchy of Aleppo (1991–2000)

Orders
- Ordination: 17 October 1954
- Consecration: 18 December 1983 by Ignatius Antoine II Hayek

Personal details
- Born: 8 August 1930 (age 96) Shiyyah, Greater Lebanon

Denys Raboula Antoine Beylouni (born 8 August 1930) is a Lebanese Syriac Catholic hierarch, who served as Archbishop of Aleppo of the Syriacs from 1991 to 2000 and subsequently as Curial Bishop of the Syriac Catholic Patriarchate of Antioch until his retirement in 2011. He has held the title of Titular Archbishop of Mardin of the Syriacs since 2000.

== Early life and priesthood ==
Beylouni was born on 8 August 1930 in Shiyyah (alternatively spelled Chayah) in Beirut, Lebanon. He was ordained a priest for the Syriac Catholic Church on 17 October 1954.

== Episcopal ministry ==
On 12 July 1983, Pope John Paul II appointed him Titular Bishop of Mardin dei Siri and Auxiliary Bishop in the Syriac Catholic Patriarchate of Antioch. He was consecrated bishop on 18 December 1983 by Patriarch Ignatius Antoine II Hayek.

On 1 June 1991 he was appointed Archbishop of Aleppo of the Syriacs. His resignation from the see was accepted on 16 September 2000.

Following his resignation from Aleppo, he was named Titular Archbishop of Mardin of the Syriacs and Curial Bishop of Antioch of the Syriacs, serving in the central administration of the patriarchate until 2011.

== Synod of Bishops ==
Beylouni participated in the Special Assembly for the Middle East of the Synod of Bishops, held in the Vatican in October 2010, as Titular Archbishop of Mardin of the Syriacs and Curial Bishop of Antioch of the Syriacs.

In interviews during this period, he spoke about the situation of Christians in the Middle East and the challenges facing the region's ancient Christian communities.

== Retirement ==
His resignation as Curial Bishop of Antioch was accepted on 1 March 2011.
