= Syriac Catholic Eparchy of Cairo =

Syriac Catholic ecclesiastical territory in Egypt

Eparchy of Cairo

Location
- Country: Egypt

Statistics
- Population: Total: (as of 2023); 1,520

Information
- Denomination: Catholic Church
- Sui iuris church: Syriac Catholic Church
- Rite: West Syriac Rite
- Established: 3 December 1965
- Secular priests: 4

Current leadership
- Pope: Leo XIV
- Patriarch: Ignatius Joseph III Yonan
- Eparch: Ephrem Warde

The Syriac Catholic Eparchy of Cairo (informally Cairo of the Syriacs) is a Syriac Catholic Church ecclesiastical territory or eparchy of the Catholic Church in Egypt. It is immediately exempt to the Syriac Catholic Patriarch of Antioch, though not part of his or any other ecclesiastical province.

Its cathedral is the Cathedral of Our Lady of the Rosary in the episcopal see of Cairo.

== History ==
The Eparchy of Cairo was established on 3 December 1965 on territory previously without a Syriac Catholic ordinary or territory.

== Ordinaries ==
Eparchs (Bishops) of Cairo

- Basile Pierre Habra (1963.07.06 – retired 1965.12.03), previously Titular Bishop of Batnæ of the Syriacs (1963.05.01 – 1963.07.06)
- Basile Moussa Daoud (1977.07.22 – 1994.07.01), later Metropolitan Archbishop of Homs of the Syriacs (Syria) ([1994.07.01] 1994.07.06 – 1998.10.13), Patriarch of Antioch of the Syriacs (Lebanon) ([1998.10.13] 1998.10.20 – 2001.01.08), President of Synod of the Syriac Catholic Church (1998.10.20 – 2001.01.08), Prefect of Congregation for the Oriental Churches (2000.11.25 – 2007.06.09), Grand Chancellor of Pontifical Oriental Institute (2000.11.25 – 2007.06.09), emeritate as Patriarch ad personam (2001.01.08 – 2012.04.07), created Cardinal-Patriarch (2001.02.21 – 2012.04.07)
- Clément-Joseph Hannouche (1995.06.24 – 2020.04.09), also Protosyncellus of Sudan and South Sudan (1997 – 2020.04.09)
- Bishop Yaacoub Semaan, Patriarchal Administrator of Cairo, Egypt (2020.04.09 - 2022.05.12), Patriarchal Exarch of Jerusalem and Patriarchal Administrator of Sudan and South Sudan.
- Ephrem Warde (2022.05.12 – present)

== List of Churches ==
There are three churches in Cairo and Alexandria

- Cathedral of Our Lady of the Rosary in Cairo
- St. Catherine's Church - Heliopolis
- Church of the Heart of Jesus - Alexandria

== See also ==
- Dioceses of the Syriac Catholic Church
- List of cathedrals in Egypt
- Syriac Catholic Patriarchal Dependency of Sudan and South Sudan
- Syriac Catholic Patriarchal Exarchate of Jerusalem
