= Clément-Joseph Hannouche =

Syriac Catholic bishop (1950–2020)

- Eparch of Cairo
- Native name: كليمان چوزيف حنوش
- Church: Syriac Catholic Church
- Diocese: Eparchy of Cairo
- In office: 24 June 1995 – 9 April 2020
- Predecessor: Ignatius Moses I Daoud
- Successor: Ephrem Warde
- Other post: Protosyncellus of Sudan and South Sudan (2012-2020)
- Previous post: Protosyncellus of Sudan (1997-2012)

Orders
- Ordination: 13 June 1976 by Basile Pierre Charles Habra
- Consecration: 19 March 1996 by Ignatius Antony II Hayyek

Personal details
- Born: 27 March 1950 Cairo, Kingdom of Egypt
- Died: 9 April 2020 (aged 70) Cairo, Egypt

Clément-Joseph Hannouche (27 March 1950 – 9 April 2020) was an Egyptian Syriac Catholic hierarch, Bishop of Cairo since 1995.

Hannouche was born in Egypt and was ordained to the priesthood in 1976. He served as bishop of the Syriac Catholic Eparchy of Cairo, Egypt, from 1996 until his death in 2020. He also had jurisdiction in the Syriac Catholic Patriarchal Dependency of Sudan and South Sudan.
