= St. Toma Syriac Catholic Cathedral =

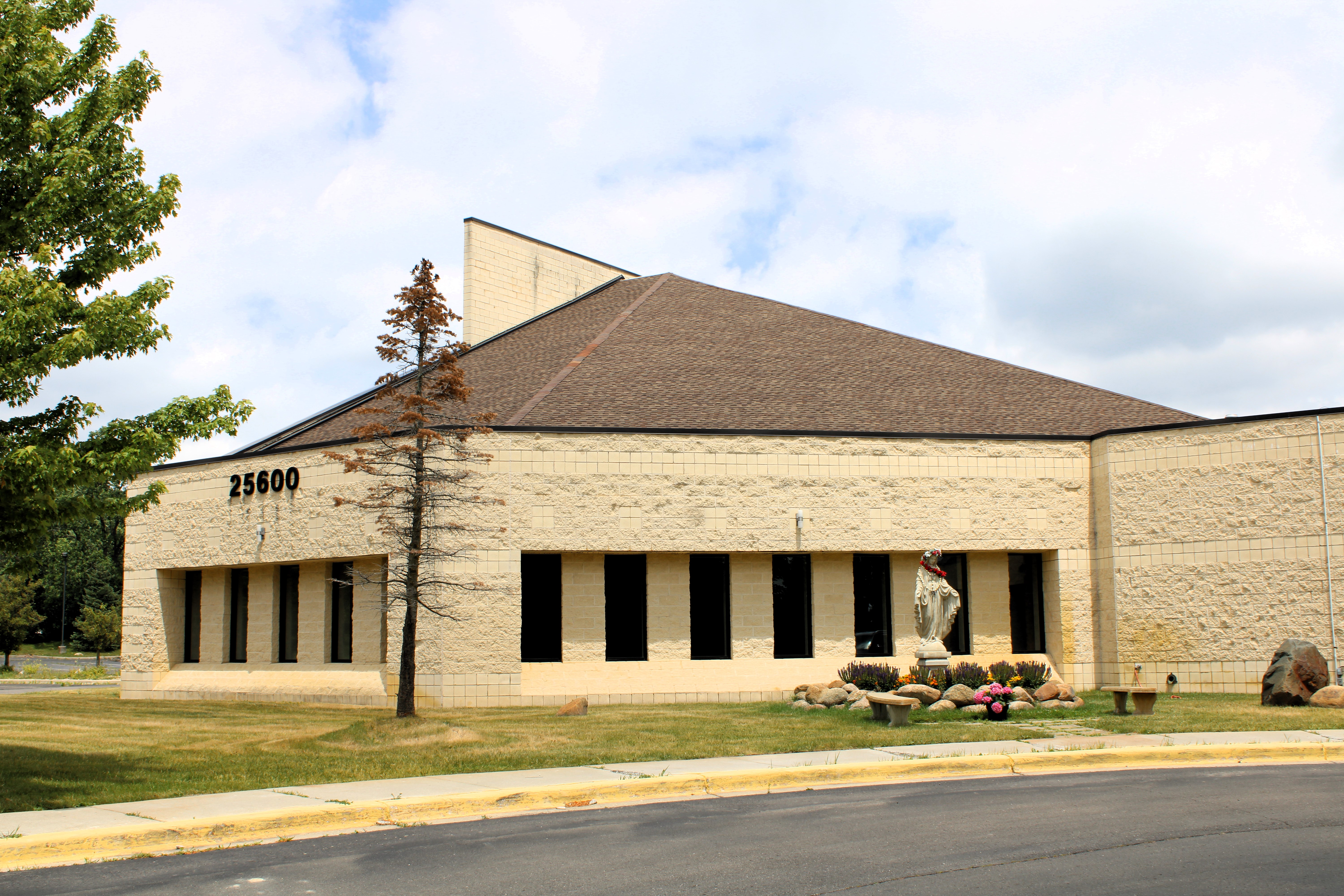
- The church building in 2023
- St. Toma Syriac Catholic Cathedral
- 42°28′57.5″N 83°23′54.3″W
- Location: 25600 Drake Rd. Farmington Hills, Michigan
- Country: United States
- Denomination: Catholic Church
- Sui iuris church: Syriac Catholic Church
- Website: www.martomami.com

History
- Status: Cathedral; Parish church
- Dedication: Thomas the Apostle
- Dedicated: 2002

Architecture
- Architectural type: Modern

Administration
- Diocese: Our Lady of Deliverance in the United States

Clergy
- Bishop: Most Rev. Yousif Habash

St. Toma Cathedral is a Syriac Catholic cathedral located in Farmington Hills, Michigan, United States. It is the seat of the Eparchy of Our Lady of Deliverance in the United States. St. Toma is the first church erected outside of the Middle East to serve Syriac Catholics, who locally, were refugees from Iraq, Lebanon, and Syria. They initially used facilities of the Roman Catholic Archdiocese of Detroit before acquiring a church building of their own. The property on which the present church is located was bought from the Archdiocese of Detroit. The foundation stones were laid in 2000 by Patriarch Ignatius Moses I Daoud, and the church was completed in 2002.

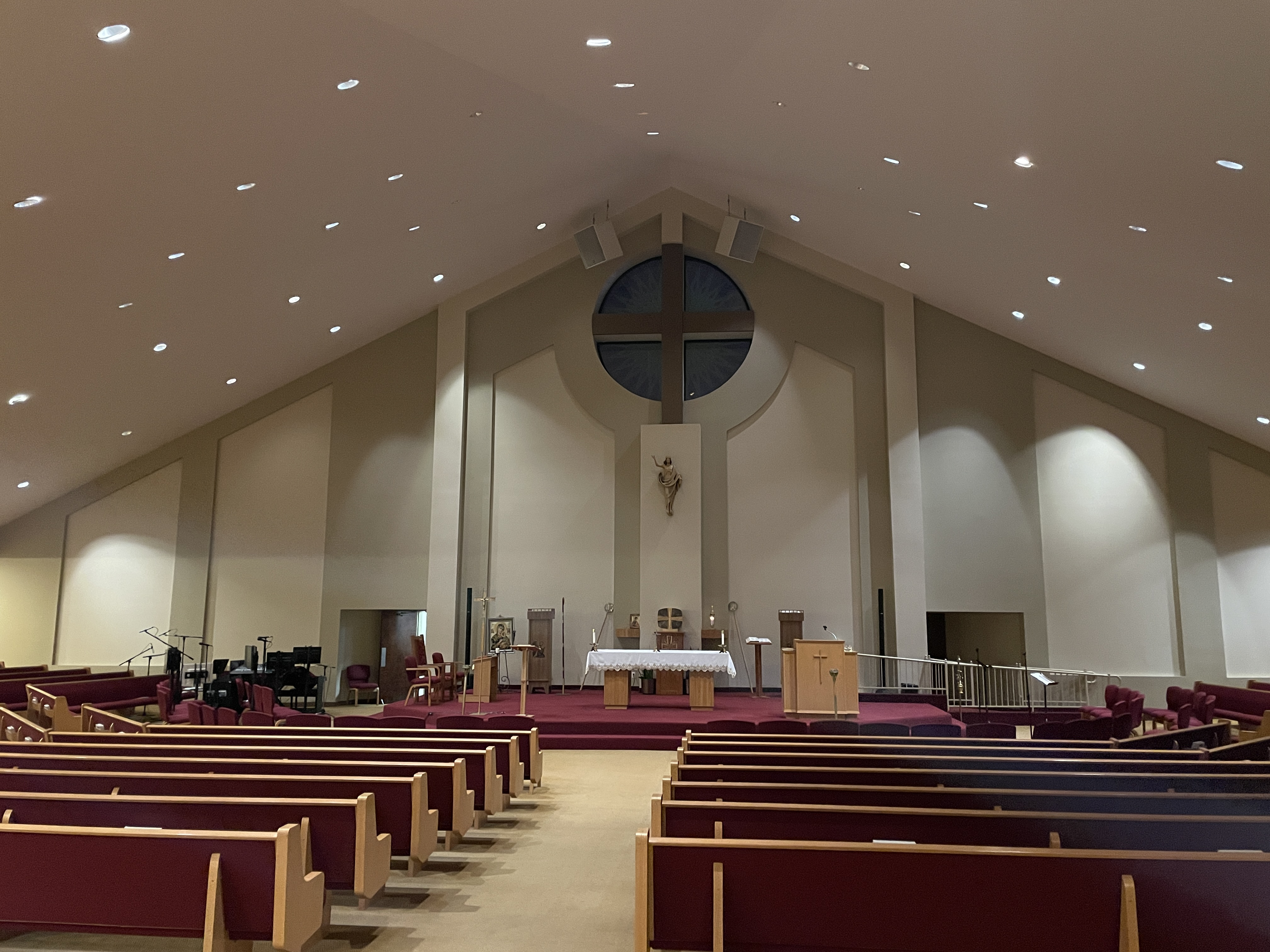
Cathedral interior

The eparchy was established by Pope John Paul II in 1995. A cathedral was established in the former St. Joseph Roman Catholic Church in Bayonne, New Jersey in 2011. In 2018, that church building was deconsecrated, and the property became part of a planned redevelopment project. St. Joseph Cathedral moved to the former St. Michael's Roman Catholic Church, also in Bayonne. On July 1, 2022, Pope Francis approved moving the seat of the Eparchy of Our Lady of Deliverance from St. Joseph Cathedral in Bayonne to St. Toma. The move places the cathedral closer to the center of the Syriac Catholic population in the United States.

== See also ==
- List of Catholic cathedrals in the United States
- List of cathedrals in the United States
