= Melki =

Melki is a surname. Notable people with the surname include:

- Alexander Michel Melki (born 1992), Lebanese footballer
- Claude Melki (1939–1994), French actor
- Gilbert Melki (born 1958), French actor
- Grégoire Pierre Melki (born 1939), Syrian Syriac Catholic bishop
- Felix Michel Melki (born 1994), Lebanese footballer
- Flavien Joseph Melki (1931–2026), Syrian Syriac Catholic bishop
- Flavien Zacharie Melki (1899–1989), Syriac Catholic archbishop
- Leonard Melki (1881–1915), Eastern Catholic priest
- Mourad Melki (born 1975), Tunisian football player
- Pierre-Antoine Melki, of French music production and songwriting duo soFLY & Nius
- Yaqub Melki, or Flavianus Michael Malke (1856-1915), Syrian Catholic bishop, martyr

== See also ==
- Maleki (disambiguation)
- Melkite, various Byzantine Rite Christian churches
- Kfar Melki, town in the Sidon District, Lebanon
