= Order of Saint Ignatius of Antioch =

The Order of Saint Ignatius of Antioch is an honorific lay order and ecclesiastical decoration founded in 1985 by the Patriarch of the Syriac Catholic Church. The Patriarch of Antioch is automatically the Grand Master who leads the order. That is currently Ignatius Joseph III Yonan.

The Order of Saint Ignatius of Antioch, while completely independent of the Holy See, is under ecclesiastical patronage sui iuris by the Syriac Catholic Patriarchate of Antioch in accordance with the Code of Canons of the Eastern Churches. As such, it is recognised as a legitimate ecclesiastical decoration by the International Commission on Orders of Chivalry.

== Notable recipients ==
- Grand Masters
  - Ignatius Peter VIII Abdalahad
  - Ignatius Antony II Hayyek
  - Ignatius Moses I Daoud
  - Ignatius Joseph III Yonan
- Other ranks
  - Issam Fares

== See also ==
- List of ecclesiastical decorations
