= Yacoub Joseph Chami =

Syriac Catholic archbishop (born 1959)

Most Reverend Yaqoub Joseph Abdel-Jalil Chami
- Archbishop of Hasakah–Nisibis
- Native name: يعقوب جوزيف شامي
- Church: Syriac Catholic Church
- Appointed: 12 May 2022
- Installed: 18 June 2022
- Predecessor: Jacques Behnan Hindo
- Other post: Patriarchal Administrator of Hasakah–Nisibis (2019–2022)

Orders
- Ordination: 21 June 1987
- Consecration: 18 June 2022 by Ignatius Joseph III Yonan

Personal details
- Born: Joseph Abdel-Jalil Chami; 15 August 1959 (age 67) Hassaké, Syria
- Education: Holy Spirit University of Kaslik

Yaqoub Joseph Abdel-Jalil Chami (born 15 August 1959) is a Syrian Syriac Catholic hierarch, who has served as the Archbishop of Hasakah–Nisibis since 2022.

== Biography ==
Joseph Chami was born in Hassaké, Syria, in 1959. In 1972, he entered the Minor Seminary and completed his ecclesiastical studies in 1982 at the Holy Spirit University of Kaslik.

He was ordained a priest on 21 June 1987 for the Syriac Catholic Patriarchal Eparchy of Beirut. Following his ordination, he served in various pastoral roles, including parish priest of the Cathedral of Hassaké and as a judicial vicar. He later served as the patriarchal administrator of the Archeparchy since 31 October 2019, following the retirement of Archbishop Jacques Behnan Hindo in 2019.

=== Episcopal Ministry ===
On 12 May 2022, after election by the Synod of the Syriac Catholic Church and confirmation by Pope Francis, he was appointed Archbishop of the Syriac Catholic Archeparchy of Hasakah-Nisibis. He was consecrated and enthroned on 18 June 2022 by Patriarch Ignatius Joseph III Yonan, taking the episcopal name Yaqoub.

In 2024, Chami announced that the Christian community in the region would not participate in municipal elections, citing concerns over the legal framework and the controversial nature of the electoral process in a conflict zone. He remains an active member of the annual synods of the Syriac Catholic Church.

== See also ==
- Syriac Catholic Church
- Christianity in Syria
