= St. Joseph Cathedral (Bayonne, New Jersey) =

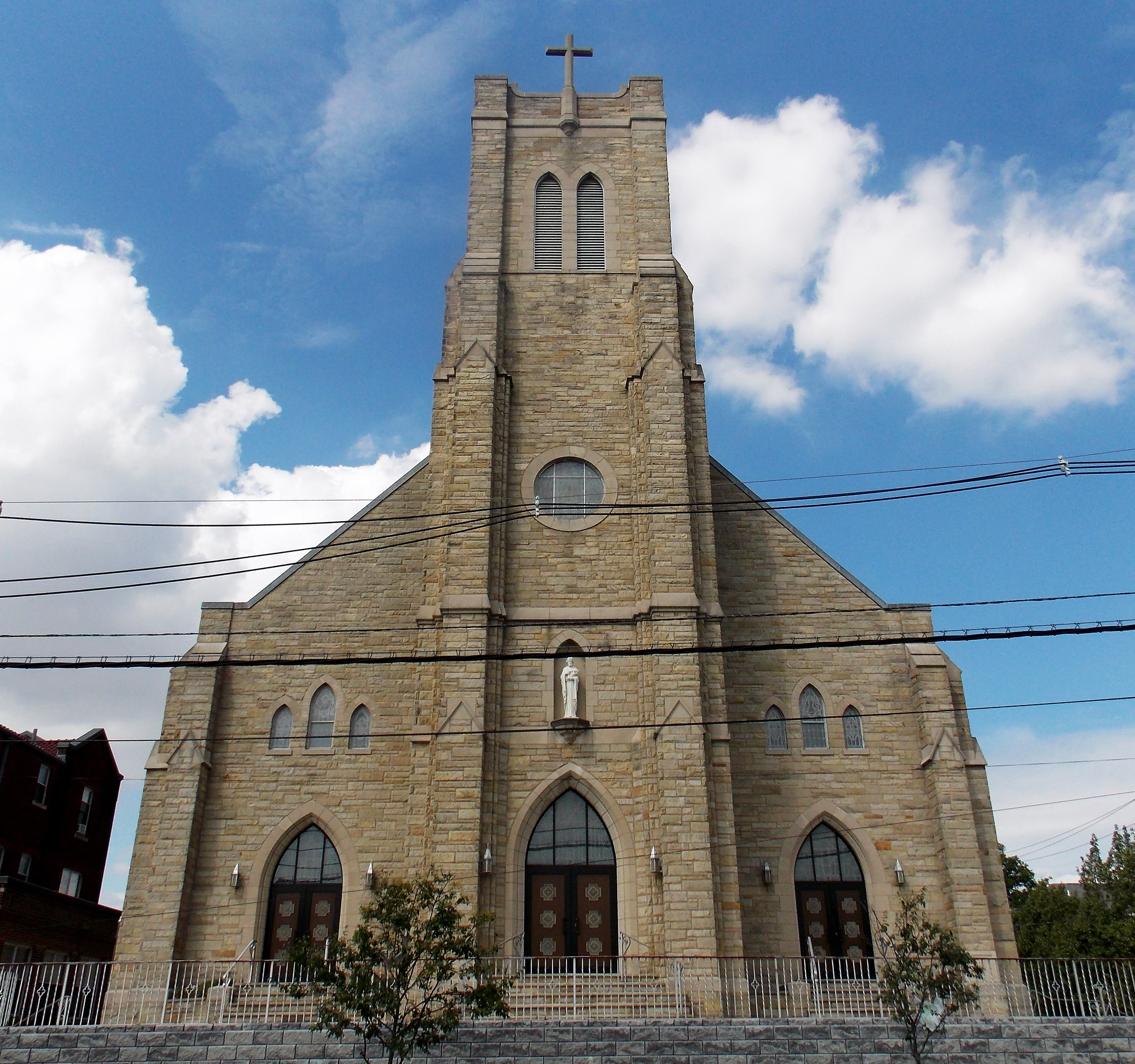
- The former St. Joseph Roman Catholic Church

- Location within Hudson County, New Jersey
- 40°39′49.9″N 74°07′02.4″W
- Location: 21 E. 23rd St. Bayonne, New Jersey
- Country: United States
- Denomination: Catholic Church
- Sui iuris church: Syriac Catholic Church

History
- Status: Cathedral; Parish church
- Founded: 2011

Architecture
- Demolished: 2020

Administration
- Diocese: Eparchy of Our Lady of Deliverance of Newark

Clergy
- Bishop: Most Rev. Yousif Habash

St. Joseph Cathedral was a predominantly Iraqi-American Syriac Catholic cathedral located in Bayonne, New Jersey, United States. It was the seat of the Eparchy of Our Lady of Deliverance of Newark.

In 2011, the cathedral was established in the former St. Joseph Roman Catholic Church on Avenue E, a former parish of the Archdiocese of Newark. St. Joseph Parish was founded as a Slovak parish in 1888, and the church building was completed in 1909. As of 2018, that church building was deconsecrated, and the property became part of a planned redevelopment project. St. Joseph Cathedral moved to the former St. Michael's parish property on East 23rd Street.

The old St. Joseph church building was demolished in 2020 and will be replaced with a residential building. However the tower bells and St Joseph statue were preserved. The bells were placed on the top of a bell tower across the street from City Hall and were dedicated in November 2022.

On July 1, 2022, Pope Francis approved moving the seat of the Eparchy of Our Lady of Deliverance from St. Joseph Cathedral in Bayonne to St. Toma in Farmington Hills, Michigan. The move places the cathedral closer to the center of the Syriac Catholic population in the United States.

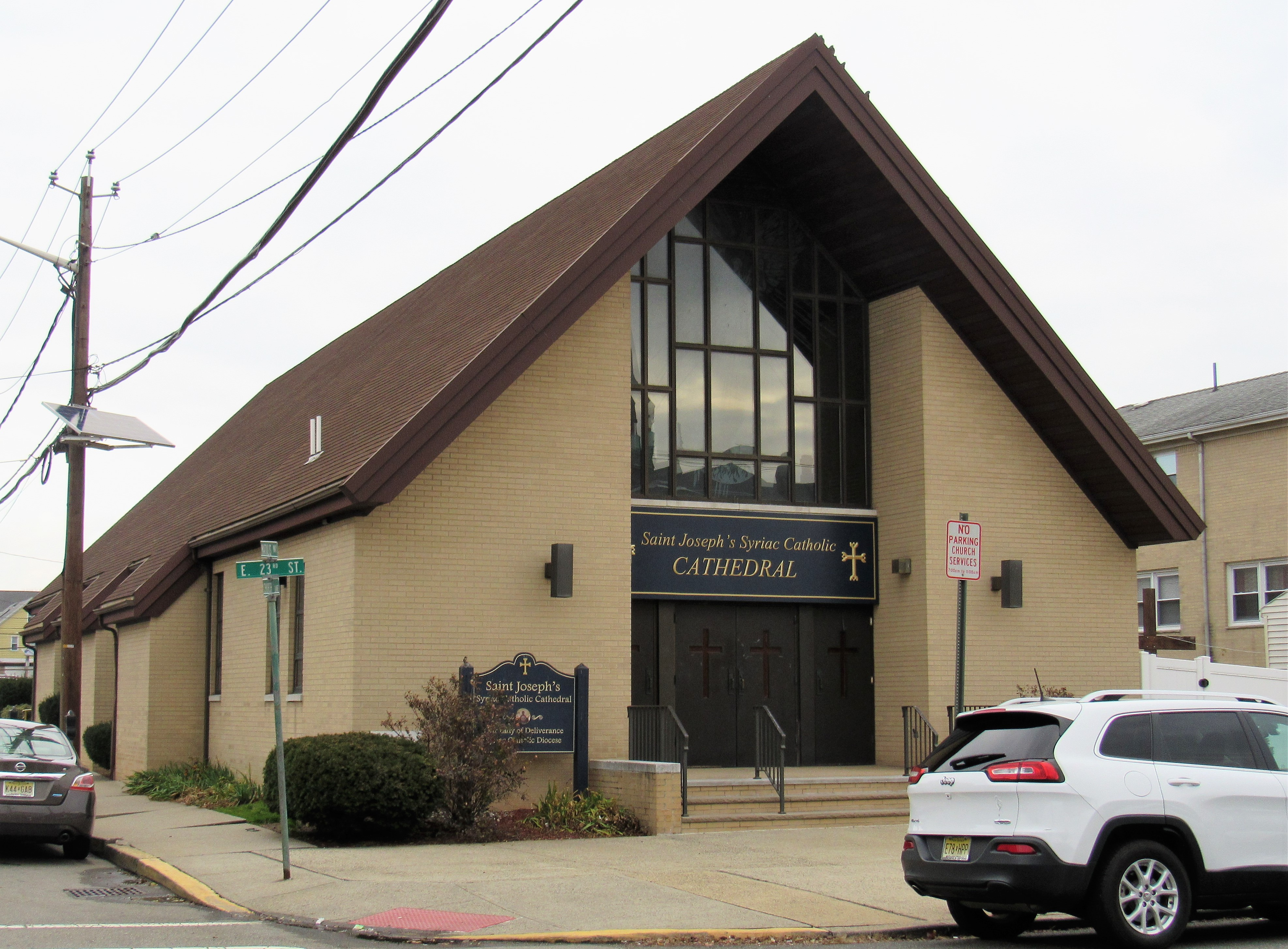
The former St. Michael's Roman Catholic Church

== See also ==
- List of Catholic cathedrals in the United States
- List of cathedrals in the United States
