= Jacques Behnan Hindo =

Turkish Syrian Catholic bishop (1941–2021)

- Title: Archeparch of Al Hasakah-Nisibis

Personal life
- Born: 8 August 1941 İdil, Turkey
- Died: 6 June 2021 (aged 79) Paris, France

Religious life
- Religion: Catholic
- Denomination: Syrian Catholic
- Church: Cathedral of the Assumption of Mary in Al-Hasakah
- Ordination: 4 May 1969
- Consecration: 18 June 1997

Senior posting
- Period in office: 29 June 1996 – 22 June 2019
- Predecessor: Jacques Georges Habib Hafouri
- Successor: Joseph Shamil

Jacques Behnan Hindo (8 August 1941 – 6 June 2021) was a Turkish bishop of the Syriac Catholic Church. He served as Archeparch of Al Hasakah from 1996 to 2019.

== Biography ==
Hindo was born in İdil, Turkey on 8 August 1941. He was ordained as a priest on 4 May 1969 in the Archeparchy of Al-Hasakah-Nisibi. In June 1996, he was nominated to be Archeparch of Al Hasakah-Nisibis and was consecrated on 19 June 1997 by Patriarch of Antioch Ignatius Antony II Hayyek.

During the Syrian Civil War, he actively informed the press on the abuses of ISIS and the Syrian government. He also expressed disagreement with the military actions of NATO. Hindo retired on 22 June 2019 and was succeeded by Joseph Shamil.

Jacques Behnan Hindo died in Paris on 6 June 2021 at the age of 79.
