= Flavien Joseph Melki =

Syriac Catholic bishop (1931–2026)

His Excellency Flavien Joseph Melki
- Curial Bishop Emeritus of Antioch
- Church: Syriac Catholic Church
- Appointed: 25 May 1996
- Term ended: 10 October 2011
- Other post: Titular Bishop of Dara dei Siri (1996–2026)
- Previous post: Titular Bishop of Arethusa dei Siri (1995–1996)

Orders
- Ordination: 17 October 1954
- Consecration: 30 December 1995 by Ignatius Antoine II Hayek, Eustathe Joseph Mounayer and Ignatius Moses I Daoud

Personal details
- Born: 10 October 1931 Hassaké, Al-Hasakah Governorate, Syria
- Died: 30 January 2026 (aged 94) Beirut, Lebanon
- Denomination: Syriac Catholic

Flavien Joseph Melki (10 October 1931 – 30 January 2026) was a Syrian hierarch of the Syriac Catholic Church who served as Curial Bishop of the Syriac Catholic Patriarchate of Antioch and as Titular Bishop of Dara dei Siri. He participated in synodal and administrative activities of the Syriac Catholic Church, including the Synod for the Middle East convened by the Holy See in 2010.

== Early life and priesthood ==
Flavien Joseph Melki was born on 10 October 1931 in Hassaké, in northeastern Syria. Archbishop Flavien Zacharie Melki (1899–1989) was his paternal uncle. He was ordained a priest on 17 October 1954 for the Syriac Catholic Church.

== Episcopal ministry ==
On 24 June 1995, Melki was appointed auxiliary bishop of the Syriac Catholic Patriarchate of Antioch and Titular Bishop of Arethusa dei Siri. He received episcopal consecration on 30 December 1995, with Patriarch Ignatius Antoine II Hayek as principal consecrator.

On 25 May 1996, he was elevated to the rank of archbishop and appointed Titular Bishop of Dara dei Siri, serving as Curial Bishop of the patriarchate in Beirut. His role formed part of the patriarchal administration of the Syriac Catholic Church, as reflected in ecclesiastical listings and diocesan records.

Melki was officially listed among the bishops participating in the 2010 Special Assembly for the Middle East of the Synod of Bishops, confirming his curial status at the time.

He retired from office on 10 October 2011 upon reaching the customary age of episcopal retirement.

== Public activity ==
During the 2010 Synod for the Middle East, Melki delivered an intervention addressing the situation of Christian communities in the region. His remarks were archived by Vatican Radio.

In later years, Melki appeared in European regional media discussing the decline of Christian populations in the Middle East and expressing criticism of Western political approaches toward the region.

== Death ==
Melki died in Beirut on 30 January 2026, at the age of 94.

Catholic Church titles
Preceded by —	Curial Bishop of Antioch; 1996–2011	Succeeded by —
Preceded by Athanase Matti Shaba Matoka	Titular Bishop of Dara dei Siri; 1996–2026	Succeeded by Vacant
Preceded by Sebastian Mankuzhikary	Titular Bishop of Arethusa dei Siri; 1995–1996	Succeeded by Flaviano Al-Kabalan
