= Diocese of Newark =

Diocese of Newark may refer to the following ecclesiastical jurisdictions, all with see in Newark, New Jersey, USA:

- Archdiocese of Newark, an archdiocese of the Latin Church of the Catholic Church
- Syrian Catholic Eparchy of Our Lady of Deliverance of Newark, an eparchy of the Syriac Catholic Church of the Catholic Church
- Episcopal Diocese of Newark, a diocese of the Episcopal Church
