= Church of Saint Thomas, Jerusalem =

Syriac Catholic cathedral in Jerusalem

Church of Saint Thomas
- Latin: Ecclesia Sancti Thomae
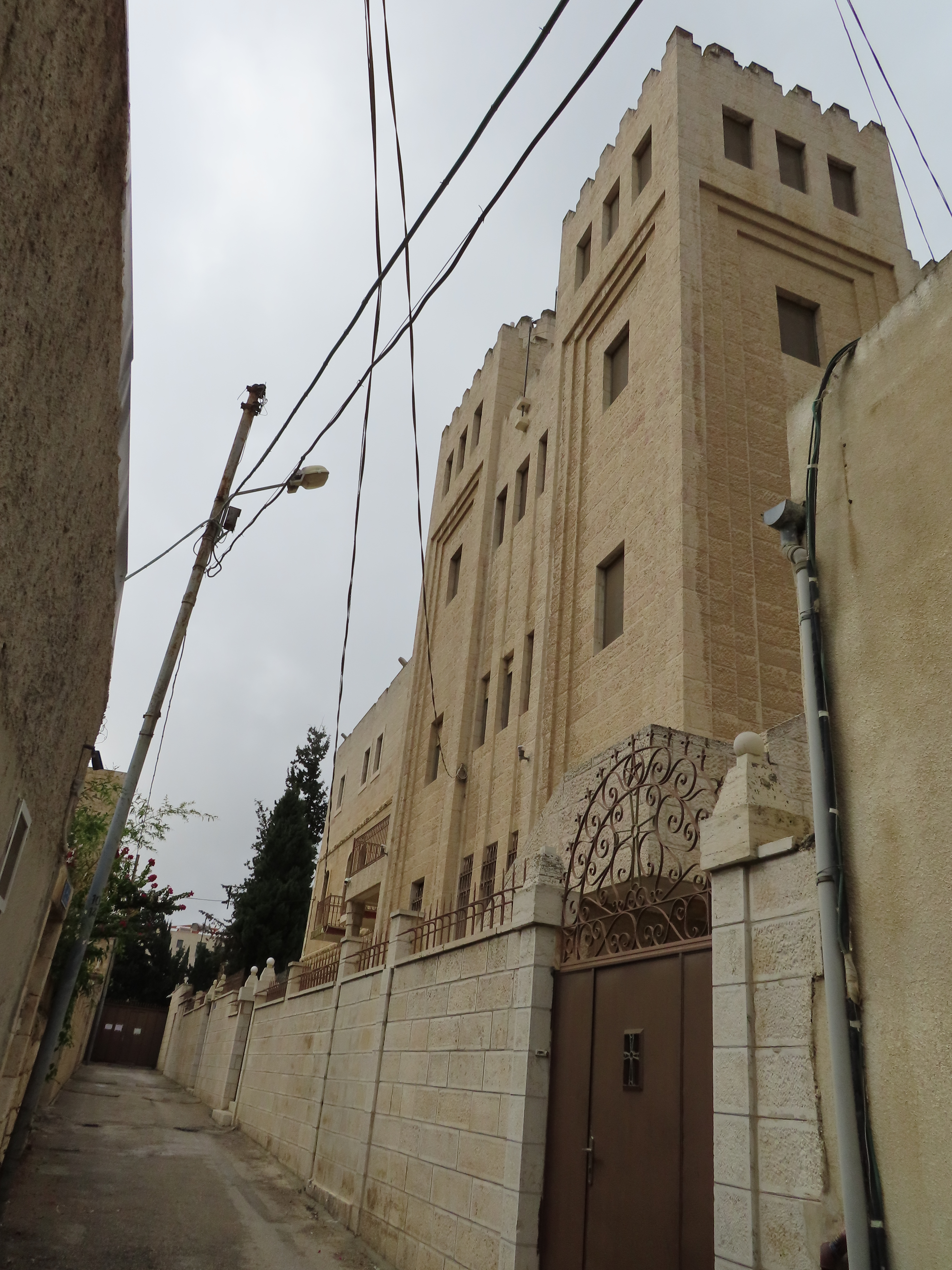
- Church of Saint Thomas
- 31.7847°N 35.2284°E
- Location: Jerusalem
- Denomination: Syriac Catholic Church

History
- Dedication: Saint Thomas

Architecture
- Completed: 1986

Administration
- Diocese: Syriac Catholic Patriarchal Exarchate of Jerusalem

The Church of Saint Thomas (Latin: Ecclesia Sancti Thomae) is a Syriac Catholic church building located in the city of Jerusalem in the Holy Land. It serves as the cathedral and headquarters of the Syriac Catholic Patriarchal Exarchate of Jerusalem. The exarchate moved several times and is now at the House of Abraham (French: Maison d'Abraham) at Ras al-Amud in East Jerusalem.

== History ==
The Syriac Catholic Patriarchal Exarchate of Jerusalem was created in 1890 after the Syriac Catholic Church accepted the Pope in Rome as its head in 1782. The Syriac Catholic Church is thus one of the first communities in Christianity. It had shares the Liturgy of Saint James and the Syriac language spoken by Jesus and the apostles. Saint Thomas was the apostle who preached in Mesopotamia (now Iraq and north of Syria and south of Turkey).

The wars and revolutions that took place between 1900 and 1973 caused the headquarters of the exarchate to be moved several times. In 1948, it had its center at the Damascus Gate of Jerusalem's Old City, then moved to Bethlehem, and 1965 again to Jerusalem. In 1986, the Church of Saint Thomas was built on Chaldean Street in East Jerusalem, along with other facilities, including a building for pilgrims and a youth center.

== See also ==
- Catholic Church in Israel
- Catholic Church in Palestine
