= Jules Boutros =

Lebanese Syriac Catholic bishop (born 1982)

The Most Reverend Jules Boutros
- Curial Bishop of the Syriac Catholic Patriarchate of Antioch
- Church: Syriac Catholic Church
- See: Patriarchal Curia of Antioch of the Syrians
- Appointed: 12 May 2022
- Previous post: Rector of the Patriarchal Seminary (2019–2022)

Orders
- Ordination: 9 June 2007
- Consecration: 18 June 2022 by Ignace Joseph III Younan

Personal details
- Born: Isaac Jules Peter Georges Boutros; 28 December 1982 (age 43) Beirut, Lebanon
- Education: Holy Spirit University of Kaslik, Pontifical Urban University, Pontifical Salesian University

Isaac Jules Peter Georges Boutros (born 28 December 1982) is a Lebanese Syriac Catholic hierarch, who has served as a Curial Bishop of the Syriac Catholic Patriarchate of Antioch since 2022 and titular bishop of Amida. At the time of his appointment he was reported to be the youngest Catholic bishop in the world.

== Early life and education ==
Boutros was born on 28 December 1982 in Beirut, Lebanon. He studied philosophy at the Holy Spirit University of Kaslik and theology at the Pontifical Urban University in Rome. He later specialised in social communication and obtained a doctorate in pastoral theology from the Pontifical Salesian University.

== Priesthood ==
Boutros was ordained a priest on 9 June 2007. Following his ordination he worked in youth and university pastoral ministry. In 2019 he was appointed rector of the Patriarchal Seminary of the Syriac Catholic Church.

He has also served as a professor of theology at Domuni Universitas.

== Episcopacy ==
On 12 May 2022 the Synod of Bishops of the Syriac Catholic Church elected Boutros as bishop of the Patriarchal Curia of Antioch of the Syrians and assigned him the titular see of Amida. The election received the assent of Pope Francis the same day. He was consecrated bishop on 18 June 2022 at the monastery of Our Lady of Deliverance in Charfet, Harissa-Daraoun. At the time of his appointment, aged 39, he was described as the youngest Catholic bishop in the world.

== Public statements ==
Boutros has spoken about the challenges facing Christians in Lebanon, including the economic crisis and the aftermath of the 2020 Beirut explosion.

He has also emphasised the importance of supporting young Christians and encouraging them to remain in the Middle East despite emigration pressures.
