= Ephrem Warde =

Lebanese-born Syriac Catholic bishop (born 1977)

Most Reverend Ephrem Élie Joseph Warde
- Bishop of Syriac Catholic Eparchy of Cairo
- Church: Syriac Catholic Church
- Province: Cairo
- Appointed: 12 May 2022
- Predecessor: Yaacoub Semaan (Patriarchal Administrator)
- Other post: Patriarchal Vicar for Syriac Catholic Patriarchal Dependency of Sudan and South Sudan (since 2022)

Orders
- Ordination: 28 May 2004
- Consecration: 18 June 2022 by Ignatius Joseph III Younan

Personal details
- Born: Élie Joseph Warde; 28 August 1977 (age 48) Haddad, Beirut, Lebanon
- Education: Holy Spirit University of Kaslik, Pontifical Oriental Institute, Catholic University of Paris

Ephrem Élie Joseph Warde (born 28 August 1977) is a Lebanese-born Syriac Catholic hierarch, who has served as the Bishop of the Syriac Catholic Eparchy of Cairo and the Patriarchal Vicar for Syriac Catholic Patriarchal Dependency of Sudan and South Sudan since 2022.

== Early life and education ==
Warde was born in Haddad-Bekaatouta, Beirut, Lebanon. He entered the patriarchal seminary of Charfet and pursued his ecclesiastical studies at the Holy Spirit University of Kaslik. He later moved to Rome, where he earned a license in Canon Law from the Pontifical Oriental Institute (2007) and after studied at the Catholic University of Paris, with a doctorate in Canon Law in 2015.

== Priesthood ==
He was ordained to the priesthood on 28 May 2004. During his ministry, he served as a parish priest in several locations, including the Syriac Catholic parish of St. Ephrem in Paris, France. He also held the role of judicial vicar for the Syriac Catholic Church and was a member of the commission for the revision of the Code of Canons of the Eastern Churches.

== Episcopal ministry ==
On 12 May 2022, following the election by the Synod of Bishops of the Syriac Catholic Church and the subsequent confirmation by Pope Francis, Warde was appointed Bishop of the Eparchy of Cairo and Patriarchal Vicar for Sudan and South Sudan. Upon his election, he adopted the episcopal name Ephrem.

He received his episcopal consecration on 18 June 2022 from Patriarch Ignatius Joseph III Yonan, assisted by four other Syriac hierarchs.
