= Syriac Catholic Archeparchy of Hasakah-Nisibis =

Eastern Catholic archeparchy in Syria

Archeparchy of Hasakah-Nisibis Archeparchia Hassakensis et Nisibenus Syrorum

Location
- Country: Syria
- Headquarters: Hasakah, Hasakah Governorate, Syria

Statistics
- Population: (as of 2023); 1,500
- Parishes: 9

Information
- Denomination: Syriac Catholic Church
- Sui iuris church: Syriac Catholic Church
- Rite: West Syriac Rite
- Established: 15 July 1957; 69 years ago
- Cathedral: Cathedral of the Assumption of Mary in Hasakah
- Patron saint: Assumption of Mary
- Secular priests: 1 Diocesan
- Language: Syriac

Current leadership
- Pope: Leo XIV
- Patriarch: Ignatius Joseph III Yonan
- Archeparch: Yacoub Joseph Chami

The Syriac Catholic Archeparchy of Hasakah-Nisibi(s) or of Al Hasakeh-Nisibi(s) (in French Hassaké–Nisibi) (informally Hasakah–Nisibi(s) of the Syriacs) is a non-metropolitan archeparchy (Eastern Catholic archdiocese) of the Syriac Catholic Church (sui iuris, Syro-Antiochian Rite in Syriac language) in Syria.

It is directly dependent on the Syriac Catholic Patriarch of Antioch and the Roman Congregation for the Oriental Churches), not part of any ecclesiastical province.

The cathedral of the Assumption of Mary in Hasakah is its archiepiscopal see.

== History ==
Established on 17 July 1957 as Eparchy of Hasakah, on Syriac territory previously without proper Ordinary for the particular church sui iuris.

Promoted on 3 December 1965 as Archdiocese of Hasakah–Nisibi(s), adopting as honorary second title Nisibi(s), a grand old, suppressed Metropolitan see which has titular archbishopric successor sees in four other Catholic rites but never was a Syriac Catholic diocese.

== Leadership ==
=== Eparch of Hasakah ===
- Jean Karroum (21 February 1959 – 3 December 1965 see below)

=== Archeparchs of Hasakah ===
- Jean Karroum (see above 3 December 1965 – 22 March 1967)
- Jacques Michel Djarwé (18 July 1967 – 8 September 1981)
- Jacques Georges Habib Hafouri (18 March 1982 – 28 June 1996), retired
- Jacques Behnan Hindo (29 June 1996 – 22 June 2019), retired
  - Patriarchal Administrator Denys Antoine Chahda (22 June 2019 – 17 October 2019), Archeparch of Aleppo
  - Patriarchal Administrator Yacoub Joseph Chami (31 October 2019 – 12 May 2022), Priest of Beirut
- Yacoub Joseph Chami (12 May 2022 – Present)

=== Another priest of this eparchy who became eparch ===
- Ephrem Joseph Yonan (1971-1995), appointed Eparch of Our Lady of Deliverance in the United States in 1995
