= Yaacoub Semaan =

Syriac Catholic bishop in Jerusalem (born 1980)

The Most Reverend Yaacoub Semaan
- Patriarchal Exarch of Jerusalem
- Church: Syriac Catholic Church
- Province: Antioch
- Diocese: Jerusalem, Palestine and Jordan
- Installed: 28 March 2020
- Predecessor: Grégoire Pierre Melki

Orders
- Ordination: 24 June 2006 by Ignatius Peter VIII Abdalahad
- Consecration: 15 August 2020 by Ignatius Joseph III Younan

Personal details
- Born: Camil Afram Antoine Semaan; 2 May 1980 (age 46) Beirut, Lebanon
- Denomination: Syriac Catholic
- Education: Holy Spirit University of Kaslik, Université La Sagesse

Yaacoub Camil Afram Antoine Semaan (born 2 May 1980) is a Lebanese-born Syriac Catholic hierarch, who has served as the Patriarchal Exarch of Jerusalem, Palestine and Jordan and the Titular Bishop of Hierapolis in Syria of the Syrians since 2020.

== Early life and education ==
Born Camil Afram Antoine Semaan in Beirut, Lebanon, he entered the Charfet Seminary and studied philosophy and theology at the Holy Spirit University of Kaslik. In 2011, he obtained a licentiate in canon law from the Université La Sagesse in Beirut.

== Priesthood ==
He was ordained a priest on 24 June 2006 for the Syriac Catholic Patriarchate of Antioch by Patriarch Ignatius Peter VIII Abdalahad. Following his ordination, he served in various pastoral roles within the Patriarchate, notably serving the Syriac Catholic community in the Holy Land for many years. He served as the Administrator of the Exarchate in Jerusalem since 20 November 2019, following the retirement of his predecessor.

== Episcopal ministry ==
On 28 March 2020, with the assent of Pope Francis, the Synod of Bishops of the Syriac Catholic Church elected him as the Patriarchal Exarch of Jerusalem, Palestine and Jordan and the Titular Bishop of Hierapolis in Syria of the Syrians. Upon his election, he adopted the episcopal name Yaacoub (Jacob).

He was consecrated bishop on 15 August 2020 at the Our Lady of the Annunciation Cathedral in Beirut, Lebanon, by Patriarch Ignatius Joseph III Younan. As Exarch, Semaan oversees the spiritual care of Syriac Catholic faithful in a territory covering Israel, the Palestinian territories, and Jordan. He has been active in interfaith dialogue and supporting local Christian communities, including initiatives involving Hebrew-speaking Catholics in the region.

On 15 April 2020, he was appointed Patriarchal Administrator of the Syriac Catholic Eparchy of Cairo and Patriarchal Administrator of Syriac Catholic Patriarchal Dependency of Sudan and South Sudan, serving in these roles until 7 October 2022.
