= Our Lady of Soufanieh =

1980s Marian apparitions reported in Syria

Coordinates: 33°30′59″N 36°19′05″E

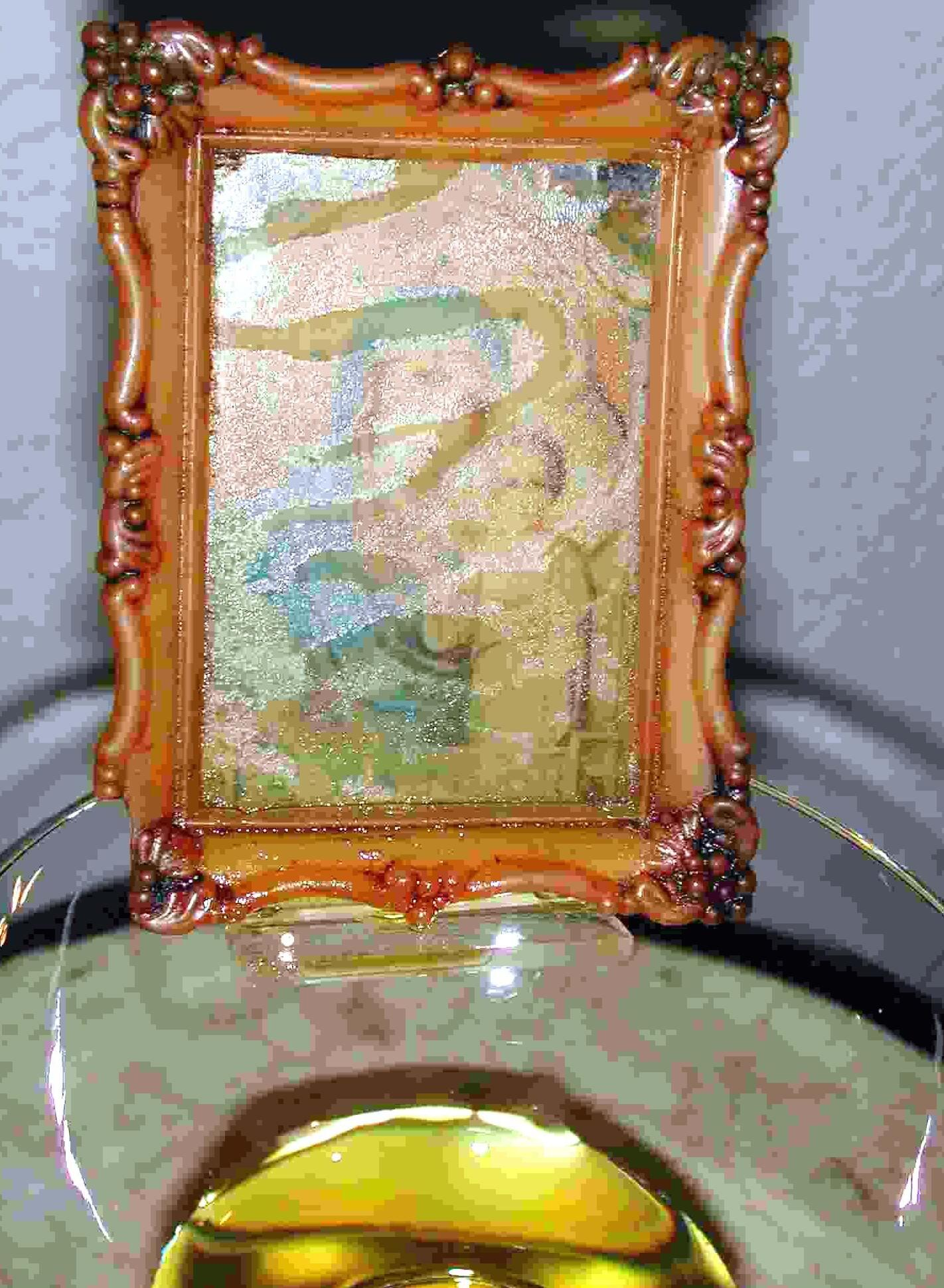
The flow of oil from an image of the Virgin Mary, which is a representation of Our Lady of Kazan. It had been purchased from an Orthodox church in Bulgaria by Nicolas Nazzour, the woman's Greek Orthodox husband.

Our Lady of Soufanieh refers to Marian apparitions reported to have occurred in Soufanieh, a suburb of Damascus in Syria starting in 1982, and continuing for 8 years until 1990.

== History ==
The apparitions reportedly occurred in December 1982 with two appearances, and three times in January, February and March of 1983. Accompanying the apparition, it was claimed by observers that a flow of oil from an image of the Virgin Mary occurred which was described as miraculous, as well as oozing of oil from the face and hands of Myrna Nazzour, a devoted Greek Catholic Melkite. Other associated events were also alleged to have happened into the 2000s.

Reporter Brigid Keenan wrote that the oil was analyzed and found to be "100 per cent olive oil". Furthermore, hundreds of people, including doctors and psychiatrists, were purported to have witnessed the strange events that had been recorded, and it was said no one could find any evidence of trickery. None of the Syrian churches have made any pronouncement about the phenomenon, but it was recognized as a miracle by archbishop Jacques Georges Habib Hafouri in 1987.

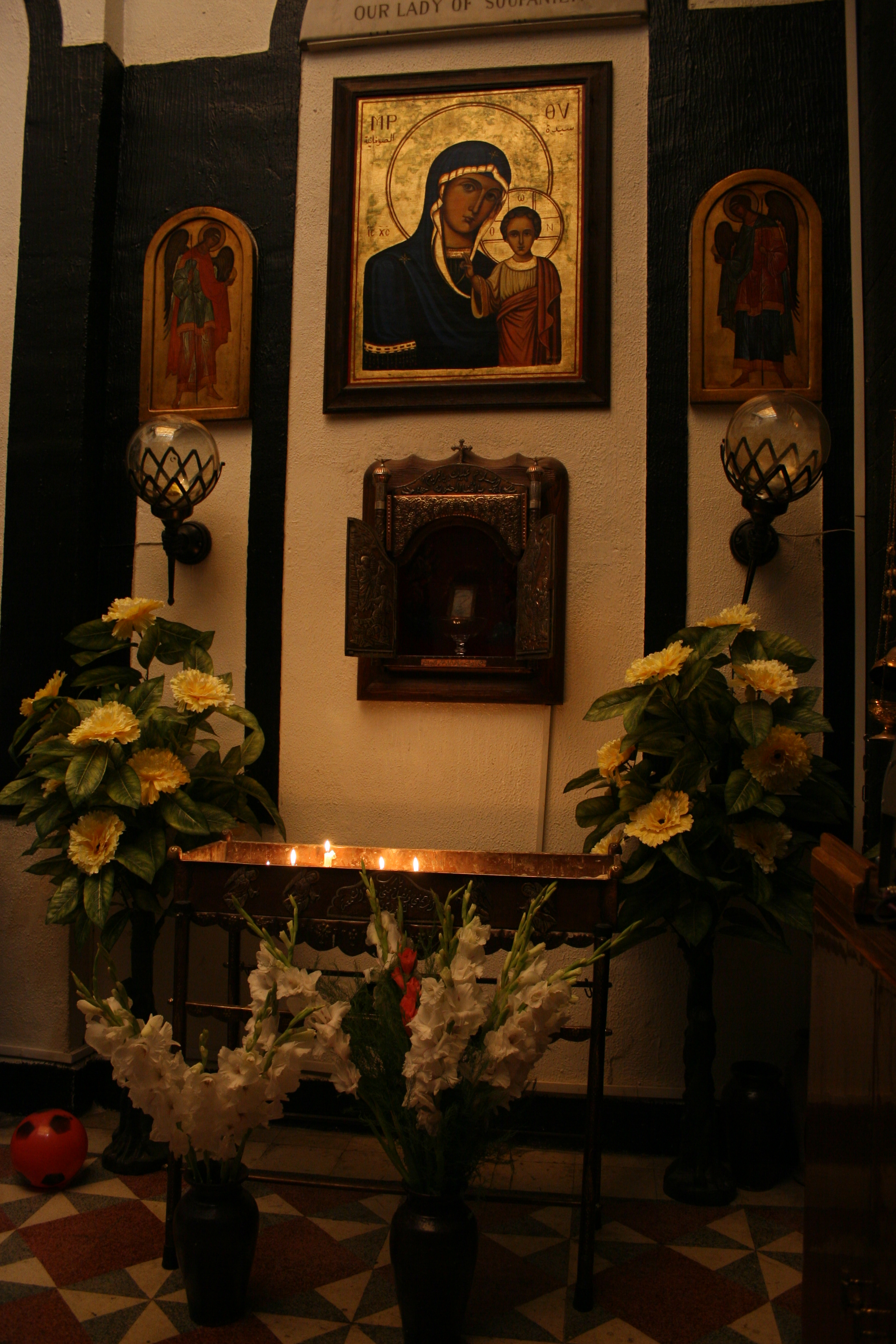
House of Our Lady of Soufanieh

According to Nazzour, she developed stigmata wounds on her "forehead, hands, feet and side", and the Virgin appeared to her outside her own home. She also stated to receiving personal apparitions from Jesus himself, and that both Jesus and Mary spoke to her sternly in Arabic about divisions in Christianity. Nazzour said the Virgin specifically told her that "Christians should pray for peace, love one another and pray for the unity of the Christian churches." Many of the miracles were said to have occurred on the feast days when Catholic and Orthodox Easter coincided, and Mary informed her of no more returns until the Churches start celebrating the liturgical festivities on the same day again.
