= İbrahim Halil Baran =

Kurdish poet, politician, writer and designer (born 1981)

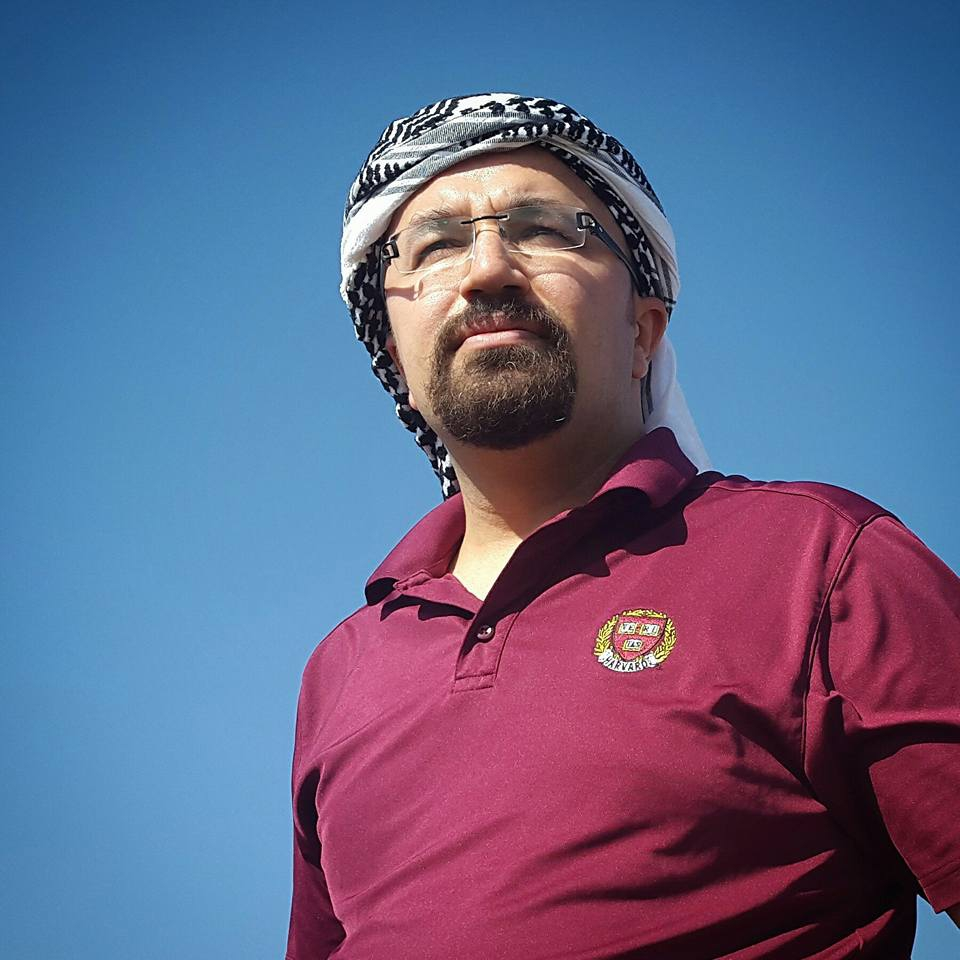
- Baran in 2017
- Native name: İbrahim Halil Baran
- Born: 1971 (age 53–54) Tionek, Suruç, Turkey
- Occupation: Poet, politician, writer and designer

İbrahim Halil Baran (Kurmanji: Îbrahîm Xelîl Baran; born 1981) is a Kurdish poet, politician, writer and designer. He is founder and first party chairman for Partiya Kurdistani (PAKURD).

Baran studied at Dicle University before receiving a master's degree at Bilkent University. He was then the editor of Yom Sanat magazine. In 2015, he wrote an article for Rudaw Media Network.

Baran was placed in detention for 13 days by Turkish Authorities for disseminating the propaganda of a terrorist organization and insulting President Recep Tayyip Erdoğan in 2017. He was initially detained on January 11 and formally arrested on January 23, before being released on April 11 under due process. Baran claimed that he had been heavily tortured, and that 16 other people related to PAKURD (including his brother) were also in prison. The court ruled in his favour, ordering the government to pay him TL 20,000 ($2,790) in damages.

In 2020, Baran republished a collection of poems, in a volume known as Sular Divanı, previously released in 2005. His previous works include Esmer Tenli Irmak Düşleri (2002)

In 2021, Baran was sentenced to 3 years and six months by a court in Urfa for "incitement against the Turkish nation, the Republic of Turkey, institutions and state body", concerning about 30 tweets and articles by Baran. Baran was not informed, and only found out about the sentence in 2022. He has not returned to Turkey since the sentence was announced.
