= Jacques Georges Habib Hafouri =

- Bishop of Archeparchy of Hassaké-Nisibi (Syria)
- Church: Syrian Catholic
- See: Archeparchy of Hassaké-Nisibi (Syria)
- In office: 1982–1996
- Predecessor: Jacques Michel Djarwé
- Successor: Jacques Behnan Hindo
- Previous post: Bishop

Orders
- Ordination: January 28, 1940

Personal details
- Born: August 20, 1916; Damas, Syria
- Died: May 4, 2011 (aged 94)

Jacques Georges Habib Hafouri (August 20, 1916 – May 4, 2011) was a Syrian Bishop of the Syriac Catholic Church. He was the oldest Syrian Catholic bishop.

Hafouri was born in Damas, Syria, and was ordained a priest on January 28, 1940. Hafouri was appointed Bishop of Archeparchy of Hassaké-Nisibi Diocese on March 18, 1982, and ordained bishop on August 13, 1982. He remained bishop of the eparchy until his retirement on June 28, 1996.

== See also ==
- Our Lady of Soufanieh
