= Suruç =

- District and municipality
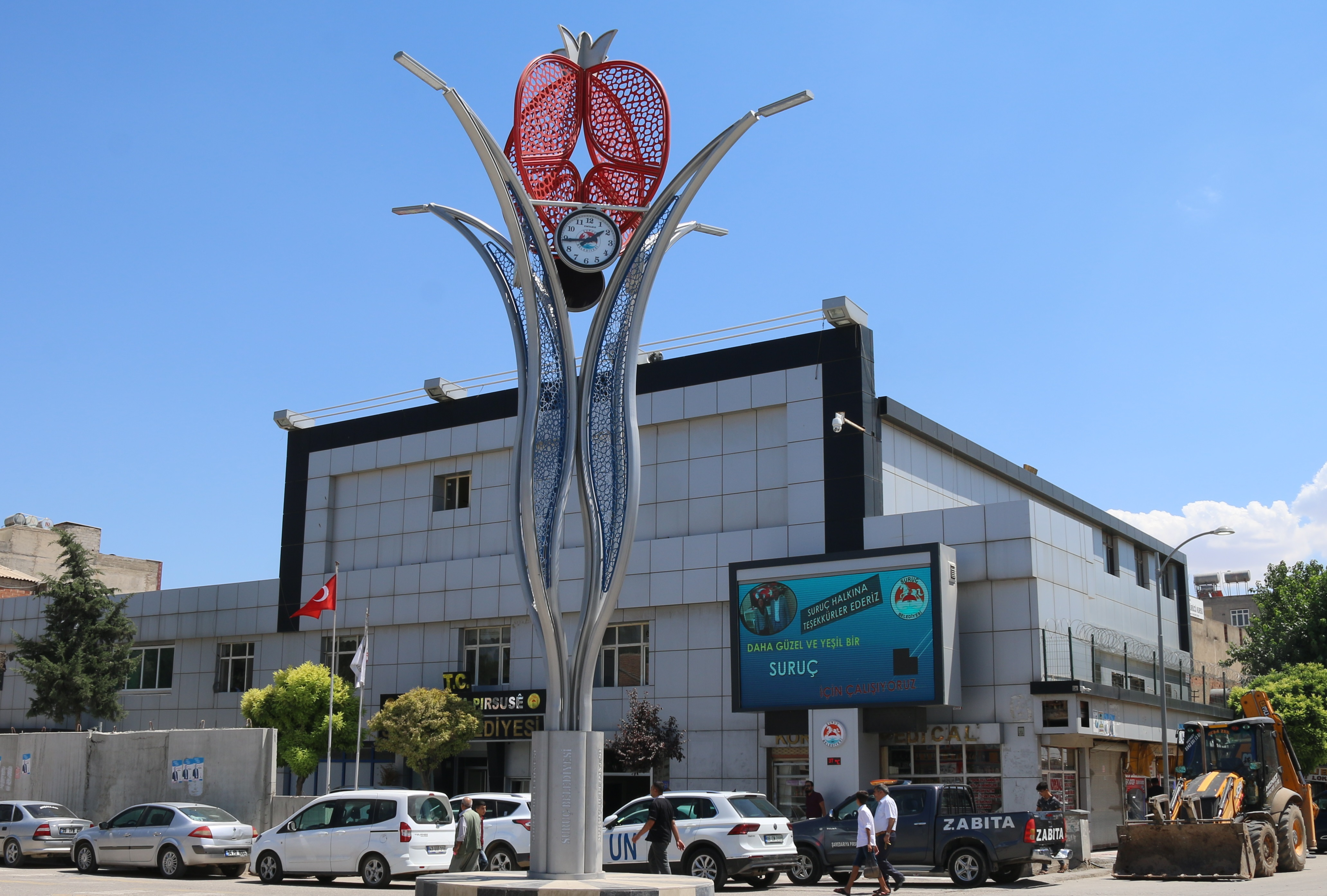
- The town hall of Suruç

- Logo

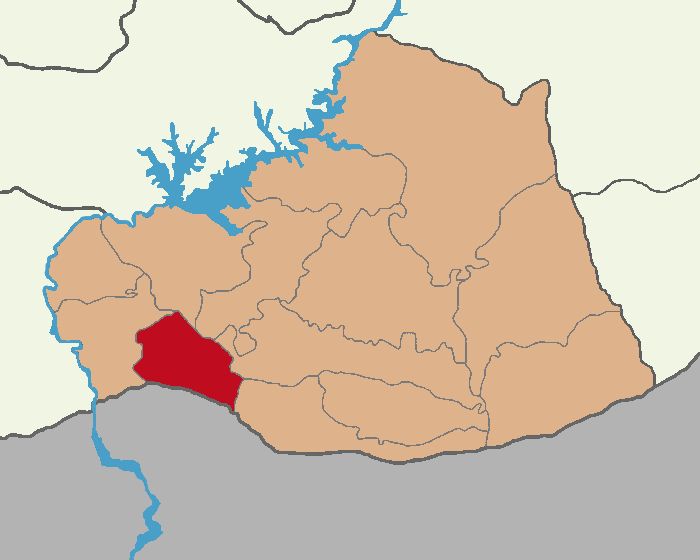
- Map showing Suruç District in Şanlıurfa Province

- Location within Turkey Location within Şanlıurfa
- Coordinates: 36°58′30″N 38°25′28″E
- Country: Turkey
- Province: Şanlıurfa
- Area: 744 km^{2} (287 sq mi)
- Population (2022): 100,961
  - Density: 136/km^{2} (351/sq mi)
- Time zone: UTC+3 (TRT)
- Postal code: 63800
- Area code: 0414
- Website: www.suruc.bel.tr

Suruç (pronounced [ˈsuɾutʃ]; Kurdish: Pirsûs; Syriac: ܣܪܘܓ Sruḡ) is a municipality and district of Şanlıurfa Province, Turkey. Its area is 744 km^{2}, and its population is 100,961 (2022). It is on a plain near the Syrian border 46 kilometres (29 mi) southwest of the city of Urfa. Its inhabitants are Kurds.

== History ==
Pirsûs (Suruç) is situated in a fertile district that is well-suited to growing fruits and grapevines. It is centrally located between the Euphrates on the west and Urfa and Harran on the east; it is about a day's journey from both cities (using pre-industrial transportation). This traffic brought it some degree of commercial prosperity as well. This was also helped by its historical status as a post station between Raqqa and Sumaysat. The town itself was primarily agricultural, and Ibn Jubayr in the 12th century described seeing orchards and irrigation channels within the area of the town itself.

=== Bronze Ages ===
In antiquity the Sumerians built a settlement in the area. The city was a centre of silk-making. They were succeeded by a number of other Mesopotamian civilisations.

In the Middle and Late Bronze Ages, this region was under the Hurrians, Mitanni, Hittites and Assyrians.

=== Roman period ===
Constantine the Great, Roman emperor who reigned from 306 to 337, brought the town under the control of the city of Edessa. The name Batnan (Syriac: Batnāē) was the common designation in the Roman and Byzantine periods (known as Batnae). In 363, Tell-Batnan was visited by Emperor Julian on his march from Antioch to the Euphrates.

=== Arabic period ===
The Arabic name Saruj (the root of the modern Turkish Suruç) became prominent after the Islamic conquests in the 7th century CE. One of the most famous residents of the district is its 6th-century Syriac bishop and poet-theologian Jacob of Serugh. The Catholic Church hold the bishopric as a titular see of that church, though they had little presence in the area, while the Syriac church holds a separate Bishopric in the town. The typonym is often associated with the biblical name Serug.

The town surrendered in 639 to Iyad ibn Ghanm during the Muslim conquest of the Levant. In the 900s it came under the Hamdanid dynasty. Later, it was captured by the Byzantines during a period when they were relatively strong in the region. In the late 1090s, a civil war between the Seljuk princes of Damascus and Aleppo enabled the early Artuqid prince Sökmen to establish a principality based at Suruç. This only lasted briefly, though — in 1101, the crusader Baldwin I of Jerusalem captured Suruç. For almost half a century, Suruç then formed part of the crusader County of Edessa. This is alluded to in the works of the contemporary poet al-Hariri: the hero of his maqāmāt, Abū Zayd al-Sarūjī, is a native of Suruç who was driven out by the Christians. Crusader rule in Suruç came to an end in January 1145, when the town was captured by Imad ad-Din Zangi.

In the 1300s, Abu'l-Fida described the town as lying in ruins. In 1517 the area was brought into the Ottoman Empire by Selim I.

In late Ottoman times, Suruç was the seat of a kaymakam.

=== 21st century ===
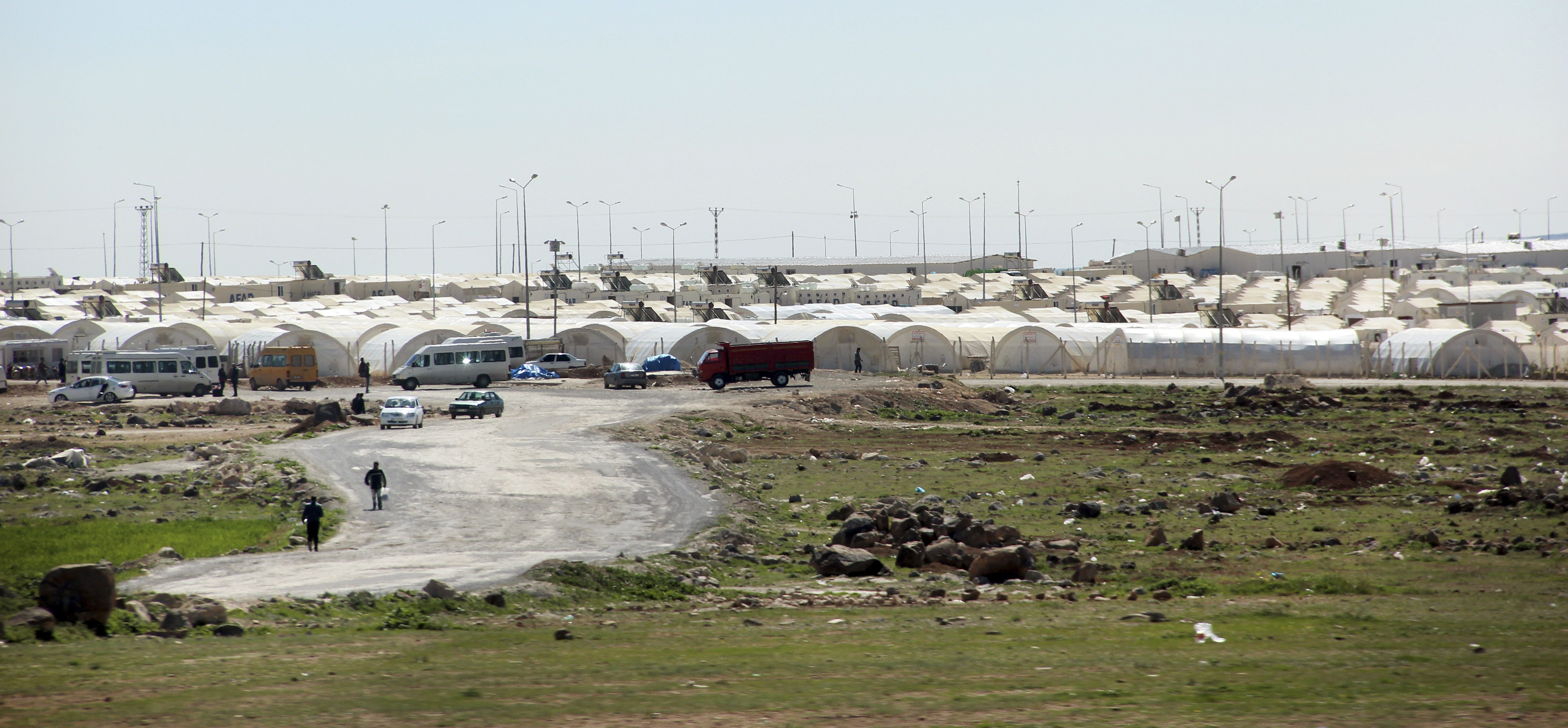
Refugee camp in Suruç in 2016

On 19 October 2014, journalist Serena Shim died in a car crash in Suruç.

On 20 July 2015, at approximately 12:50 GMT, a suicide bombing occurred. It killed 34 people and injured over 100 others outside the Amara Cultural Center.

Ahead of the June anticipated 2018 Turkish elections, four people were killed in Suruç while an AKP candidate toured the city's market. According to pro-Kurdish sources, AKP representative Ibrahim Halil Yıldız went to local shopkeeper Hacı Esvet Şenyaşar where a brawl started.

- Celal Şenyaşar, son of Haci Esvet Şenyaşar, during the initial brawl at the shop, was shot and killed there.
- Mehmet Şenyaşar, son of Haci Esvet Şenyaşar, visiting the hospital following the brawl, was attacked and hit on the head repeatedly with an oxygen tank and killed.
- Haci Esvet Şenyaşar, the shop keeper, was lynched at the Suruç hospital.
- Mehmet Ali Yıldız, brother of MP Yıldız, died at the Mehmet Akif Inan Hospital in Urfa.
- One of his bodyguards of Mehmet Ali Yıldız, died at the Mehmet Akif Inan Hospital in Urfa.
- The Suruç hospital's CCTV systems were damaged.

These events happened days after Erdogan was filmed encouraging identification and intimidation of opposition voters on sites.

==== Politics ====
In the local elections on 31 March 2019 Hatice Çevik was elected as Mayor. Kenan Aktaş was appointed Kaymakam, as representative of the state. On 15 November 2019 Çevik was detained, and the next day she was dismissed and Kenan Aktaş appointed as a trustee.

== Composition ==
There are 95 neighbourhoods in Suruç District:

- Ağırtaş
- Akören
- Alanyurt
- Aligör
- Aşağı Karıncalı
- Aşağı Oylum
- Aybastı
- Aydın
- Ayhan
- Balaban
- Barış
- Bellik
- Bilge
- Binatlı
- Boztepe
- Bozyokuş
- Büyük Sergen
- Büyük Ziyaret
- Büyükağacı
- Çanakçı
- Çaykara
- Çengelli
- Çomak
- Cumhuriyet
- Demokrasi
- Dikili
- Dinlence
- Dumlukuyu
- Ekili
- Eskice
- Eskiören
- Ezgil
- Fıstıklı
- Göleç
- Gölen
- Günebakan
- Hacılı
- Harmanalan
- Hürriyet
- Hüyükyanı
- İzci
- Kalkanlı
- Kapıcı
- Karaca
- Karadut
- Karahüyük
- Karaköy
- Karakuyu
- Karataş
- Keberli
- Kesmecik
- Kırmıt
- Kızılhüyük
- Köseler
- Köseveli
- Küçük Sergen
- Küçük Ziyaret
- Küçükköprü
- Küçükova
- Kurutepe
- Mertismail
- Mollahamza
- Mürşitpınar
- Ölçektepe
- Örgütlü
- Ortabostancı
- Oymaklı
- Özlüce
- Sarayaltı
- Saygın
- Taşlıkuyu
- Tavşanköy
- Tokçalı
- Topçular
- Üçpınar
- Uludüz
- Üveçli
- Uysallı
- Uzgören
- Yağışlı
- Yalınca
- Yalpı
- Yanaloba
- Yatırtepe
- Yaylatepe
- Yazıköy
- Yeğen
- Yenişehir(Şaryanı)
- Yıldırım
- Yıldız
- Yönlü
- Yukarı Bostancı
- Yumurtalık
- Yurtçiçeği
- Zeyrek

== Demographics ==
In his seyahatname, Evliya Çelebi mentioned that the plain of Suruj was initially inhabited by Arabs and Turkomans in mid-medieval era, while upon his visit in the 17th century, he observed that the plain was mainly inhabited by Kurds from the Dinayi, Barazi, Kuhbinik, and Jum tribes and Turkomans.

According to Agha Petros, before the Assyrian genocide, Suruç (Serudj) had close to 2,000 Assyrian residents.

Today, Suruç is inhabited mostly by ethnic Kurds and Turks.

== Ecclesiastical history of Batnae ==
Batnae was important enough in the Roman province of Osroene to become a suffragan bishopric of its capital Edessa's Metropolitan, yet was to fade. The most famous Bishop of the city was Jacob of Serugh, the great Syriac Christian hymnographer born around 451 at Kurtam on the Euphrates and educated at Edessa becoming a priest at Hawra in the Serugh district, as a wandering pastor of several villages. At the age of 67 he was made bishop of Batnan, where he died around 521. Jacob avoided the theological controversies of his age, and is claimed with equal eagerness by Chalcedonian and non-Chalcedonian Christians as one of their own. He wrote several Hymns, 760 homilies and the Syriac translation of Evagrius.

Another Bishop was Abraham of Batnae, a contemporary of Basil of Caesarea.

The bishopric would be nominally restored in two different titular bishoprics, for different Catholic rite-specific particular churches.

=== Syriac titular see ===
Established in the early 20th century, under repeatedly changed names: Bathna(-Jarug), Bathnan(Sarugh), Bathnae. Suppressed in 1933, restored under its present name in 1965.

It has had the following incumbents, all of the lowest (episcopal) rank :

- Teofilo Gabriele Tappouni (Dionisio) (1913.01.19 – 1921.02.24), as Auxiliary Eparch of Mardin and Amida of the Syriacs (Turkey) (1912.09.14 – 1921.02.24); previously titular bishop of Danaba-orum (1912.09.14 – 1913.01.19); later Archeparch of Aleppo of the Syriacs (Syria) (1921.02.24 – 1929.06.24), Eparch of Mardin and Amida of the Syriacs (1929.06.24 – 1962), Patriarch of Antioch of the Syriacs (Lebanon) ([1929.06.24] 1929.07.15 – 1968.01.29), created Cardinal-Priest of Ss. XII Apostoli (1935.12.19 – 1965.02.11), promoted Cardinal-Patriarch (1965.02.11 – 1968.01.29)
- Atanasio Behnam Kalian (1921.02.26 – 1929.08.06) as Auxiliary Bishop of Antioch of the Syriacs (Lebanon) (1921.02.26 – 1929.08.06), Auxiliary Bishop of Mardin and Amida of the Syriacs (Turkey) (1921.02.26 – 1929.08.06), later Archeparch of Baghdad of the Syriacs (Iraq) (1929.08.06 – death 1949.02.17)
- Bishop-elect Basile Pierre Habra (1963.05.01 – 1963.07.06)
- Gregorios Elias Tabé (1995.06.24 – 1996.05.25) as Auxiliary Bishop of Antioch of the Syriacs (Lebanon) (1995.06.24 – 1997), later titular bishop of Mardin of the Syriacs (1996.05.25 – 1999.05.08), Bishop of Curia of the Syriacs (1997 – 1999.05.08), Coadjutor Archeparch of Damascus of the Syriacs (Syria) (1999.05.08 – 2001.06.24), succeeding as Metropolitan Archbishop of Damascus of the Syriacs (2001.06.24 – ...)
- Grégoire Pierre Abdalahad (1996.06.29 – 2001.02.16) while Patriarchal Vicar of Jerusalem of the Syriacs (Palestine and Jordan) (1978–1991 and 1991–2000), later Patriarch of Antioch of the Syriacs (Lebanon) ([2001.02.16] 2001.02.24 – 2008.01.25), President of Synod of the Syriac Catholic Church (2001.02.24 – 2008.01.25)
- Grégoire Pierre Melki (2002.02.25 – ...) of the Syriac Catholic Patriarchal Exarchate of Jerusalem (Palestine and Jordan, see in the Holy Land)

== Notable people ==
- Abdülkadir Aygan (1958–) former PKK Member
- İbrahim Halil Baran (1981–) Kurdish poet
- Bozan Shaheen Bey (1890–1968) Kurdish leader, MP, Xoybûn founder
- Ayşe Gökkan (1965–) Kurdish journalist
- Leyla Uysal, researcher and urban designer
- Abdurrahman Yalçınkaya (1950-) Turkish judge

== See also ==
- Suruç Water Tunnel, Turkey's longest water tunnel

== Sources and external links ==
- GigaCatholic - Latin titular see with incumbent biography links
- GigaCatholic - Syriac titular see with incumbent biography links
