= Ayşe Gökkan =

Kurdish feminist in Turkey

Ayşe Gökkan (born 1965 in Kulince, Sanliurfa) is a Kurdish journalist, feminist, spokeswoman of the Free Women Movement (TJA) and a former Mayor of Nusaybin. As a journalist, she has been active in news outlets such as Özgür Gündem or Azadiya Welat. Gökkan was sentenced to 30 years imprisonment on grounds that she was a leader and a member of a terror organization in October 2021.

== Early life and education ==
She was born in the village Kulince in Suruç, Şanlıurfa Province. After having attended primary school in her village, she graduated from high school in Urfa. Later she studied journalism at the American University of Northern Cyprus from which she graduated in 1998.

== Political career ==
She was an active member of the People's Labour Party (HEP), the Democracy Party (DEP), the People's Democracy Party (HADEP) the Democratic People's Party (DEHAP) and the Democratic Society Party (DTP). For the HADEP she was a candidate for the Grand National Assembly of Turkey but was not elected as the party didn't pass the electoral threshold of 10%. Representing the DTP, she was elected as the mayor of Nusaybin in the local elections of 2009. As Mayor of Nusaybin she opposed the construction of the border wall between the pro-Kurdish administration in Rojava and Turkey in 2013.

=== Human rights activist ===
In February 2020, she was elected as the new spokeswoman of the TJA. In June 2023, she filed a criminal complaint against Hakan Fidan, the former Director of the National Intelligence Organization and other public officials who protected a commander of the Ahrar al Sharqiya who graduated from the Artuklu University in Mardin in June 2023.

In November 2023, she was awarded a recognition prize of CHF 10,000 by the Swiss Paul Grüninger Foundation for her activities as a journalist and activist for women's rights.

== Legal prosecution ==
According to a news-statement from the Peoples' Democratic Party (HDP) Gökkan has been detained for more than 80 times. She was detained again in January 2021 at her house in Kayapinar, Diyarbakir and accused of being a member of the Kurdistan Communities Union, the Democratic Society Congress, the Free Women Movement and a leader and member of a terrorist organization. In October 2021, Gökkan was sentenced to 30 years imprisonment on grounds that she was a leader and a member of a terror organization. According to the International Federation of Human Rights, she was not permitted to defend herself in the Kurdish language during the trial and her lawyers abstained of preparing a defense in the last hearing because they and representatives of the Diyarbakir Bar Association were assaulted and mistreated by the police present in the courtroom in a past hearing.
