= Grégoire Pierre Melki =

Syriac Catholic bishop (born 1939)

The Most Reverend Grégoire Pierre Melki
- Patriarchal Exarch of Jerusalem and the Holy Land
- Native name: غريغوريوس بطرس ملكي
- Church: Syriac Catholic Church
- Province: Patriarchate of Antioch
- Installed: 25 February 2002
- Term ended: 20 November 2019
- Predecessor: Grégoire Pierre Abdalahad
- Successor: Yaacoub Semaan (Patriarchal Administrator)
- Other post: Titular Bishop of Batnae of the Syrians (since 2002)

Orders
- Ordination: 8 August 1965 by Flavien Zacharie Melki
- Consecration: 18 May 2002 by Ignatius Peter VIII Abdalahad

Personal details
- Born: Pierre Melki; 28 December 1939 (age 86) Hassaké, Al-Hasakah Governorate, Syria
- Residence: Jerusalem

Grégoire Pierre Melki (born 28 December 1939) is a Syrian Syriac Catholic hierarch. He served as the Patriarchal Exarch of Jerusalem and the Holy Land from 2002 until 2019 and currently holds the title of Titular Bishop of Batnae.

== Biography ==
Pierre Melki was born in Al-Hasakah, Syria. He was ordained to the priesthood on 8 August 1965.

=== Episcopal ministry ===
On 25 February 2002, Pope John Paul II confirmed the election of Melki by the Synod of Bishops of the Syriac Catholic Church as the Patriarchal Exarch of Jerusalem, Palestine, and Jordan. He was simultaneously assigned the Titular See of Batnae. He was consecrated as bishop on 18 May 2002 by Patriarch Ignatius Peter VIII Abdalahad, with Eustathe Joseph Mounayer and Denys Raboula Antoine Beylouni serving as co-consecrators.

During his tenure in Jerusalem, Melki was an active participant in the Special Assembly for the Middle East of the Synod of Bishops in 2010. During the synod, he highlighted the challenges facing the small Syriac Catholic community in the Holy Land, particularly regarding the emigration of Christians and the legal difficulties of maintaining church properties.

=== Retirement ===
On 20 November 2019, was accepted Melki's resignation from the office of Patriarchal Exarch, as he had reached the age limit for retirement over 4 years. He was succeeded as Patriarchal Administrator by Yaacoub Semaan.
