= American University of Cyprus =

University in Northern Cyprus

- Motto: Scientia Potentia Est (Latin)
- Motto in English: Knowledge is Power
- Type: Private
- Location: North Nicosia, Northern Cyprus
- Campus: Urban
- Language: English
- Website: auc.edu.tr

American University of Cyprus is a private, American liberal arts university in North Nicosia, Northern Cyprus. The language of instruction is English. The university was founded in 2014, and is affiliated with Girne American University.

== Campus ==
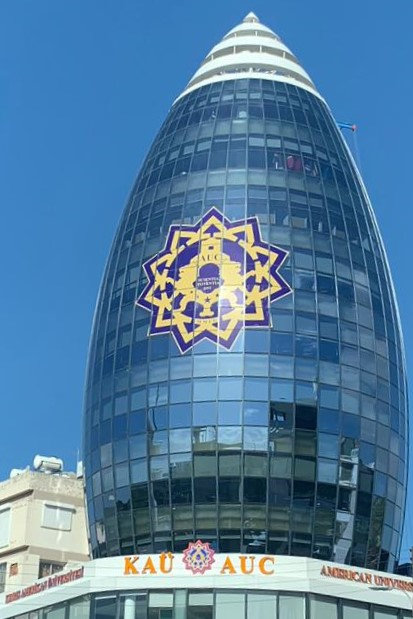
American University of Cyprus's Cloud Building in Dereboyu Avenue

The main campus of AUC is located in the Surlariçi Arabahmet of North Nicosia, with additional facilities located within the Venetian walls of Nicosia and Dereboyu Avenue

== Faculties and Programs ==
The university is made up of three faculties and one vocational school.

Faculty of Fine Arts
Architecture
Plastic Arts
Faculty of Business and Economics
Business Management
Tourism and Hospitality Management
Faculty of Political Science
Political Science
International Relations
Vocational School of Health

Also, American University of Cyprus has a Lifelong Learning Center and a Foundation School. The Lifelong Learning Center offers courses that conform to an arts and sciences curriculum and the Foundation School operates the university's English and foundation programs.

== Memberships ==
American University of Cyprus is a member of the European Council for Business Education, the International Universities Search & Rescue Council, and the Cyprus Universities Association.

== Notable alumni ==
Ayşe Gökkan
