= Nisibis (disambiguation) =

Nisibis may refer to:

- the Classic Greek name of Nusaybin (or Nizib), a presently Asian Turkish city on the Syrian border, which was an archbishopric in Mesopotamia Prima
- its various Catholic successor sees, all titular archbishoprics :
  - Nisibis of the Romans (Latin Church)
  - Nisibis of the Armenians (Armenian Catholic Church)
  - Nisibis of the Chaldeans (Chaldean Catholic Church)
  - Nisibis of the Maronites (Maronite Church)
- the former Ecclesiastical province of Nisibis of the Church of the East
- Nisibis (cockroach), a genus of insect in the family Ectobiidae

== See also ==
- Syriac Catholic Archeparchy of Hassaké–Nisibi (where Nisibis is merely an added second title)
