= Syriac Catholic Patriarchal Exarchate of Jerusalem =

Eastern Catholic missionary jurisdiction in Palestine & Jordan

Patriarchal Exarchate of Jerusalem (Syrian)

Location
- Country: Palestine, Jordan, Israel

Statistics
- Population: (as of 2020); 5,341
- Parishes: 3

Information
- Denomination: Catholic Church
- Sui iuris church: Syriac Catholic Church
- Rite: Antiochian Rite
- Established: 1892
- Cathedral: Church of Saint Thomas, Jerusalem

Current leadership
- Pope: Leo XIV
- Patriarch: Ignatius Joseph III Yonan
- Patriarchal Exarch: Yaacoub Semaan

The Syriac Catholic Patriarchal Exarchate of Jerusalem (informally Jerusalem of the Syriacs) is a Patriarchal exarchate (missionary Eastern Catholic pre-diocesan jurisdiction) of the Syriac Catholic Church (Antiochian Rite in Syriac language and Arameic) for Palestine and Jordan.

It is directly dependent on the Syriac Catholic Patriarch of Antioch (with see in Beirut), but not part of his or any other ecclesiastical province, and depends in Rome on the Dicastery for the Eastern Churches.

Its cathedral episcopal see is the Church of Saint Thomas in Jerusalem.

== History ==
Established in 1991 as Patriarchal Exarchate of Jerusalem (Palestine and Jordan), on territory (Palestine and (Trans)Jordan) previously without proper Ordinary of the particular church sui iuris, which was governed as Patriarchal Vicariate of Jerusalem of the Syriacs.

== Patriarchal Exarchs of Jerusalem (Palestine and Jordan) ==
- Father Pierre Jaroûë (? – 1820.02.25), later Patriarch of Antioch of the Syriacs (Lebanon) ([1820.02.25] 1828.01.28 – death 1851.10.16)
- Grégoire Pierre Abdalahad (1991 – 2000), Titular Bishop of Batnæ of the Syriacs (1996.06.29 – 2001.02.16); previously Patriarchal Vicar of Jerusalem (Palestine and Jordan) of the Syriacs (Palestine) (1978 – 1991); later Patriarch of Antioch of the Syriacs (Lebanon) ([2001.02.16] 2001.02.24 – retired 2008.01.25), President of Synod of the Syriac Catholic Church (2001.02.24 – 2008.01.25)
- Grégoire Pierre Melki (25 February 2002 – 20 November 2019), Titular Bishop of Batnæ of the Syriacs (2002.02.25 – present)
- Yaacoub Semaan (28 March 2020 – present)
