= Flavien Zacharie Melki =

Syriac Catholic archbishop (1899–1989)

The Most Reverend Flavien Zacharie Melki
- Titular Archbishop of Amida of the Syriacs
- Native name: فلافيان زكريا ملكي
- Church: Syriac Catholic Church
- Province: Patriarchate of Antioch
- Installed: 6 July 1963
- Term ended: 20 November 1989
- Other post: Patriarchal Vicar of Lebanon

Orders
- Ordination: 3 May 1925
- Consecration: 15 August 1963 by Ignatius Gabriel I Tappouni

Personal details
- Born: Zacharie Melki; 15 August 1899 Kalat Mara, Ottoman Empire (now Turkey)
- Died: 20 November 1989 (aged 90) Beirut, Lebanon

Flavien Zacharie Melki (15 August 1899 – 20 November 1989) was a Syriac Catholic hierarch. He served as the Patriarchal Vicar of the Syriac Catholic Patriarchate in Lebanon and was the Titular Archbishop of Amida of the Syriacs from 1963 until his death in 1989.

== Biography ==
Melki was born in the village of Kalat Mara, near Mardin (then part of the Ottoman Empire), during a period of significant upheaval for the Syriac Christian community. He was ordained to the priesthood on 3 May 1925. Future bishop Flavien Joseph Melki (1931–2026) was his nephew.

=== Episcopal ministry ===
On 6 July 1963, he was appointed by the Synod of Bishops of the Syriac Catholic Church as a titular archbishop to assist the Patriarchal administration. He was assigned the Titular See of Amida of the Syriacs. He received his episcopal consecration on 15 August 1963 from Cardinal Ignatius Gabriel I Tappouni, the Patriarch of Antioch, with Athanase Jean Daniel Bakose and Grégoire Ephrem Jarjour serving as co-consecrators.

As Patriarchal Vicar, Melki played a significant role in the administration of the church in Lebanon during the difficult years of the Lebanese Civil War. He was also an active participant in the later sessions of the Second Vatican Council (1962–1965), contributing to the discussions regarding the Eastern Catholic Churches.

=== Death ===
Archbishop Melki died in Beirut on 20 November 1989 at the age of 90.
