= Yousif Habash =

Iraqi Syriac Catholic prelate (born 1951)

His Grace, The Most Reverend Yousif Behnam Habash
- Eparch of Newark
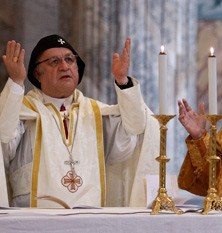
- Habash in 2016
- Church: Syriac Catholic Church
- Diocese: Eparchy of Our Lady of Deliverance of Newark
- Appointed: 12 April 2010
- Installed: 31 July 2010
- Predecessor: Ephrem Joseph Yonan

Orders
- Ordination: 31 August 1975 by Cyrille Emmanuel Benni
- Consecration: 11 July 2010 by Ephrem Joseph Yonan, Jules Mikhael Al-Jamil, Raboula Antoine Beylouni, Basile Georges Casmoussa and Athanase Matti Shaba Matoka

Personal details
- Born: 1 June 1951 (age 75) Bakhdida, Iraq
- Motto: Jesus Christ is the same yesterday and today and forever

Styles of Yousif Behnam Habash
- Reference style: His Grace; The Most Reverend
- Spoken style: His Grace
- Religious style: Eparch

Yousif Behnam Habash (Arabic: يوسف بهنام حبش; born 1 June 1951) is an Iraqi-born Syriac Catholic prelate who has served as Eparch of Our Lady of Deliverance in the United States since 2010.

== Biography ==
=== Early life and education ===
Born 1 June 1951 in Bakhdida, Iraq, Yousif Behnam Habash entered St. John's Seminary in Mosul in 1965 at the age of 14. From 1970 to 1972 he performed military service in Iraq. Thereafter, when the Mosul seminary closed, he completed his seminary studies at Charfet, Lebanon, studying at the Université Saint-Esprit de Kaslik.

=== Ordination and ministry ===
Habash was ordained a priest for the Archeparchy of Mosul on 31 August 1975 after which time he was assigned to a parish in his home town of Bakhdida and worked in youth ministry. He later served as vicar and then pastor of Sacred Heart Parish, in Basra.

In 1994, he was assigned to the Syriac Catholic Mission of North America, serving first in Newark, New Jersey and, from 2001 on, at the Church of the Sacred Heart of Jesus in West Hollywood, California.

=== Eparch of Our Lady of Deliverance of Newark ===
In April 2010, he was appointed by Pope Benedict XVI as the second eparch of the Syrian Catholic Eparchy of Our Lady of Deliverance of Newark. He was consecrated a bishop on 11 July 2010 by his predecessor Ephrem Joseph Younan, who had been elected Patriarch of Antioch and all the East of the Syrians.

Eparch Habash's territory includes the United States, and 16,000 Syriac Catholics.

== See also ==
- Catholic Church in the United States
- Dioceses of the Syriac Catholic Church
- Hierarchy of the Catholic Church
- Historical list of the Catholic bishops of the United States
- List of Catholic bishops in the United States
- List of Syriac Catholic patriarchs of Antioch
- Lists of popes, patriarchs, primates, archbishops, and bishops
