= Ignatius Peter VIII Abdalahad =

Head of the Syriac Catholic Church from 2001 to 2008

His Beatitude Ignatius Peter VIII Abdalahad
- Patriarch of Antioch and all the East of the Syrians
- Church: Syriac Catholic Church
- See: Antioch
- Installed: 20 February 2001
- Term ended: 2 February 2008
- Predecessor: Ignatius Moses I Daoud
- Successor: Ignatius Joseph III Yonan

Orders
- Ordination: October 17, 1954 (Priest)
- Consecration: June 21, 1997 (Bishop) by Antony II Hayyek

Personal details
- Born: Peter Gregory Abdalahad; 30 June 1930 Aleppo, Syrian Republic
- Died: 4 April 2018 (aged 87) Jerusalem

Ignatius Peter VIII Abdalahad (born Peter Gregory Abdalahad; 30 June 1930 – 4 April 2018) was patriarch of Antioch and all the East of the Syriac Catholic Church. He served as patriarch from 2001 to 2008, when he resigned and retired.

== Biography ==
He was ordained priest on October 17, 1954, and consecrated bishop on June 21, 1997, by Syriac Catholic Patriarch Ignatius Antony II Hayyek, and served as auxiliary bishop of Antioch till his appointment as Primate and Patriarch of the Syriac Catholic Church on February 16, 2001. His resignation was accepted on February 2, 2008. He lived in Beirut. He was succeeded by Ignatius Joseph III Yonan, who was elected as Primate and Patriarch on January 20, 2009, and his election confirmed by Pope Benedict XVI on January 22, 2009.

Ignatius Peter VIII Abdalahad died in Jerusalem on 4 April 2018.

== Distinctions ==
- Grand Master of the Order of Saint Ignatius of Antioch

Catholic Church titles
| Preceded by Jean-Elie Hallouli | Patriarchal Exarch of Jerusalem; 1991–2001 | Succeeded by Grégoire Pierre Melki |
| Preceded by Gregorios Elias Tabé | Titular Bishop of Batnae for the Syrians; 1996–2001 | Succeeded by Grégoire Pierre Melki |
| Preceded by Ignatius Moses I Daoud | Patriarch of Antioch of the Syrian Catholic Church; 20 February 2001 – 2 February 2008 | Succeeded by Ignatius Joseph III Yonan |
