= Syriac Catholic Eparchy of Our Lady of Deliverance in the United States =

Eastern Catholic ecclesiastical jurisdiction in the United States

Syriac Catholic Eparchy of Our Lady of Deliverance Eparchia Dominae Nostrae Liberationis Novarcensis Syrorum
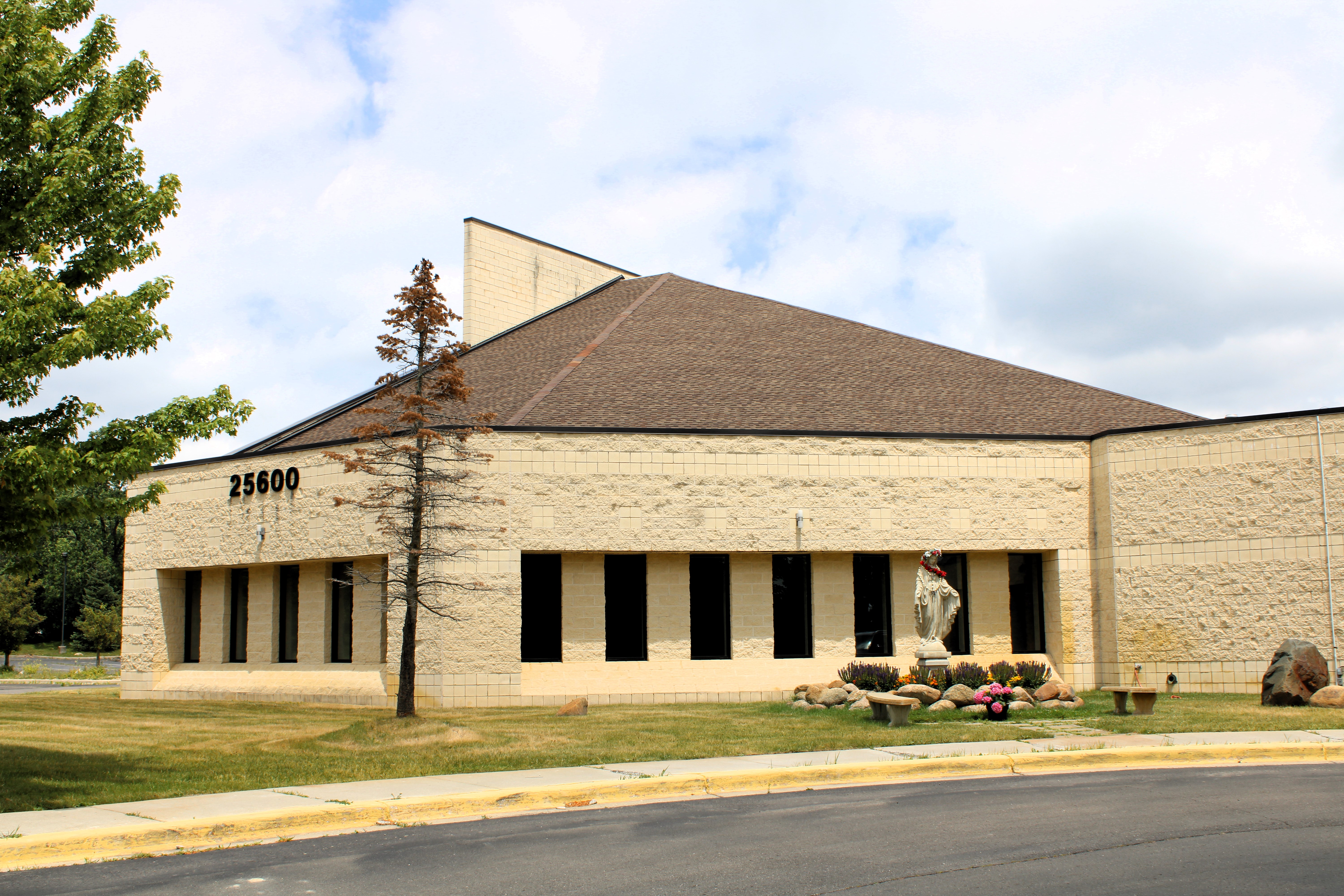
- Saint Toma Cathedral in Farmington Hills

Location
- Territory: United States of America
- Ecclesiastical province: Immediately Exempt to the Holy See

Statistics
- Population: 16,000
- Parishes: 11

Information
- Denomination: Catholic Church
- Sui iuris church: Syriac Catholic Church
- Rite: West Syriac Rite
- Established: November 6, 1995 (30 years ago)
- Cathedral: St. Toma Cathedral

Current leadership
- Pope: Leo XIV
- Eparch: Yousif Benham Habash

Website
- http://www.SyriacCatholic.US

The Syriac Catholic Eparchy of Our Lady of Deliverance is a Syriac Catholic Church ecclesiastical territory or eparchy of the Catholic Church in the United States. The territory of the eparchy encompasses the entire United States. Its cathedral is St. Toma Cathedral, in Farmington Hills, Michigan. Yousif Benham Habash has led the eparchy since April 2010.

== History ==
Until 1995, Syriac Catholic congregations in the United States and Canada were under the ordinary jurisdiction of the local Latin Church bishops.

On November 6, 1995, Pope John Paul II erected the Eparchy of Our Lady of Deliverance, immediately subject to the Holy See, and appointed bishop Joseph Younan as the first eparch, with his see at Newark, New Jersey.

In 2009, Bishop Younan was elected as Primate of the Syriac Catholic Church and Patriarch of Antioch and all the East of the Syriacs. In 2010, Pope Benedict XVI appointed Bishop Yousif Benham Habash as the second eparch.

On January 7, 2016, it lost its (southeastern) Canadian territory (then five communities in Ontario and Quebec provinces) to the newly erected Syriac Catholic Apostolic Exarchate for Canada.

On July 1, 2022, Pope Francis approved moving the seat of the Eparchy of Our Lady of Deliverance from St. Joseph Cathedral in Bayonne, New Jersey to St. Toma in Farmington Hills, Michigan. The move places the cathedral closer to the center of the Syriac Catholic population in the United States.

== Eparchs of Our Lady of Deliverance of Newark ==
1. Joseph Younan (November 6, 1995 – January 20, 2009), later Patriarch of Antioch of the Syriacs (actually in Beirut, Lebanon) ([2009.01.20] 2009.01.22 – ...) and President of the Synod of the Syriac Catholic Church (2009.01.22 – ...)
2. Yousif Benham Habash (April 12, 2010 – ...)

== Current status ==
As of 2016, the eparchy is estimated to have 16,000 faithful in 8 parishes and 6 missions.

Congregations are located in the following cities :

East coast

- Allentown, Pennsylvania
- Bayonne, New Jersey
- Boston, Massachusetts
- Jacksonville, Florida
- Farmington Hills, Michigan
- Sterling Heights, Michigan
- Northbrook, Illinois

West coast

- El Cajon, California
- Los Angeles, California
- Oceanside, California
- Phoenix, Arizona

== See also ==
- List of Catholic bishops of the United States § Eastern Catholic eparchs
