= Syriac Catholic Patriarchal Dependency of Sudan and South Sudan =

Eastern Catholic pre-diocesan jurisdiction in Sudan and South Sudan

The Syriac Catholic Patriarchal Dependency of Sudan and South Sudan is missionary pre-diocesan jurisdiction of the Eastern Catholic Syriac Catholic Church (sui iuris, Antiochian Rite in Syriac language) covering Sudan and South Sudan.

== History ==
- 1997: Established as the Syriac Catholic Patriarchal Dependency of Sudan
- 2012: Renamed to the Syriac Catholic Patriarchal Dependency of Sudan and South Sudan

== Leadership ==
=== Protosyncellus of Sudan ===
- Clément-Joseph Hannouche (1997 – 2012 see below)

=== Protosyncellus of Sudan and South Sudan ===
- Clément-Joseph Hannouche (see above 2012 – 9 April 2020)
  - Patriarchal Administrator Yaacoub Semaan (15 April 2020 – 7 October 2022), Exarch of Jerusalem

=== Patriarchal Vicar of Sudan and South Sudan ===
- Ephrem Warde (12 May 2022 – Present)
