= Ignatius Moses I Daoud =

Head of the Syriac Catholic Church from 1998 to 2001

His Beatitude and Eminence Ignatius Moses I Daoud
- Cardinal Patriarch of Antioch and all the East of the Syrians
- Coat of Arms
- Church: Syrian Catholic Church
- See: Antioch
- Installed: 25 October 1998
- Term ended: 8 January 2001
- Predecessor: Ignatius Antony II Hayyek
- Successor: Ignatius Peter VIII Abdalahad

Orders
- Ordination: 17 October 1954 (Priest)
- Consecration: 18 September 1977 (Bishop) by Antony II Hayyek
- Created cardinal: 21 February 2001
- Rank: Cardinal-Bishop

Personal details
- Born: Basile Daoud; 18 September 1930 Meskaneh, Syria
- Died: 7 April 2012 (aged 81) Rome, Italy

Ignatius Basile Moses I Daoud (or Moussa Daoud) (Syriac: ܐܝܓܢܐܛܝܘܣ ܡܘܫܐ ܩܕܡܝܐ ܕܐܘܕ) (18 September 1930 – 7 April 2012) was Patriarch of Antioch for the Syrian Catholic Church, a cardinal-bishop (because he was an Eastern patriarch elevated to the cardinalate), and Prefect of the Congregation for the Oriental Churches in the Catholic Church.

== Biography ==
Daoud was born in Meskaneh, a village near Homs, Syria, to Daoud Moussa Daoud and Kahla Elias Dabbas. He was ordained a priest on 17 October 1954. He earned a degree in Canon law at the Pontifical Lateran University in Rome. On 18 September 1977 he was consecrated bishop of Cairo by Patriarch Ignatius Antony II Hayyek. In 1994 he was appointed archbishop of Homs of the Catholic Syrians.

Then-Archbishop Moses Daoud was elected as patriarch of Antioch for the Syrian Catholic Church on 13 October 1998. He was confirmed as patriarch by Pope John Paul II on 20 October 1998, and was enthroned on 25 October 1998. By custom, he added the name Ignatius to his own name, honoring Saint Ignatius of Antioch. He retired from the patriarchal see on 8 January 2001, shortly after being named prefect for the Congregation for the Oriental Churches, which deals with Vatican relations with the Eastern-Rite churches in communion with Rome, by Pope John Paul II, on 25 November 2000.

Moses Daoud was proclaimed cardinal-bishop by Pope John Paul in the consistory of 21 February 2001. He was one of the cardinal electors who participated in the 2005 papal conclave that elected Pope Benedict XVI. On 9 June 2007, Patriarch Emeritus Ignatius Moses I resigned his post as Prefect of the Congregation for the Oriental Churches.

Until his 80th birthday, he was a member of the following dicasteries of the Roman Curia:

- Congregation for the Doctrine of the Faith
- Congregation for the Causes of the Saints
- Pontifical Council for Promoting Christian Unity
- Pontifical Council for the Interpretation of Legislative Texts
- Special Council for Lebanon of the General Secretariat of the Synod of Bishops

== Death and funeral ==
He died on 7 April 2012 in Rome.

A funeral Mass in the Roman Rite took place on 10 April 2012, at Saint Peter's Basilica in Vatican City, with the Dean of the Sacred College of Cardinals, former Cardinal Secretary of State Angelo Sodano, as principal celebrant. Cardinal Daoud's body was then flown to Beirut and with Syriac rites buried with other patriarchs of Antioch in Sharfeh, Harissa, Lebanon on 16 April 2012. In his homily, Cardinal Sodano said he had visited the ailing patriarch a few days before he died of complications from a cerebrovascular accident (CVA, or stroke). He said Cardinal Daoud told him he was "offering to the Lord his suffering for the good of the holy Church and above all for the unity of all Christians". In a message to the incumbent Syriac Patriarch of Antioch, Ignatius Joseph III Younan, Pope Benedict XVI called the Cardinal Patriarch "a faithful Pastor who devoted himself with faith and generosity to the service of the people of God". He went on to say that, "these days, when we celebrate the resurrection of the Lord", he was offering special prayers "for the peoples of the region who are living through difficult times".

== Distinctions ==
- Grand Master of the Order of Saint Ignatius of Antioch

Catholic Church titles
Preceded by Ignatius Antony II Hayyek	Patriarch of Antioch of the Syrian Catholic Church; 20 October 1998 – 8 January 2001	Succeeded by Ignatius Peter VIII Abdalahad
Preceded by Achille Silvestrini	Prefect of the Congregation for the Oriental Churches; 25 November 2000 – 9 June 2007	Succeeded by Leonardo Sandri
