= Ignatius Antony II Hayyek =

Head of the Syriac Catholic Church from 1968 to 1998

His Beatitude Ignatius Antony II Hayyek
- Patriarch of Antioch and all the East of the Syrians
- Church: Syrian Catholic Church
- See: Antioch
- Installed: March 20, 1968
- Term ended: July 23, 1998
- Predecessor: Ignatius Gabriel I Tappuni
- Successor: Ignatius Moses I Daoud

Orders
- Ordination: June 10, 1933 (Priest)
- Consecration: August 15, 1959 (Bishop) by Gabriel I Tappuni

Personal details
- Born: September 14, 1910 Aleppo, Ottoman Empire
- Died: February 21, 2007 (aged 96)

Ignatius Antony II Hayyek (or Antun Hayek, September 14, 1910 – February 21, 2007) was the Patriarch of Antioch and all the East of the Syrians of the Syriac Catholic Church from 1968 to 1998.

Antun Hayyek was born at Aleppo in 1910 and was ordained priest on June 10, 1933. On August 15, 1959 he was consecrated bishop of Aleppo by Patriarch Ignatius Gabriel I Tappuni and served there till his appointment as Primate and Patriarch on March 10, 1968. His resignation was accepted on July 23, 1998. He died on February 21, 2007.
