= Syriac Catholic Church =

Eastern Catholic church

- ܥܕܬܐ ܣܘܪܝܝܬܐ ܩܬܘܠܝܩܝܬܐ
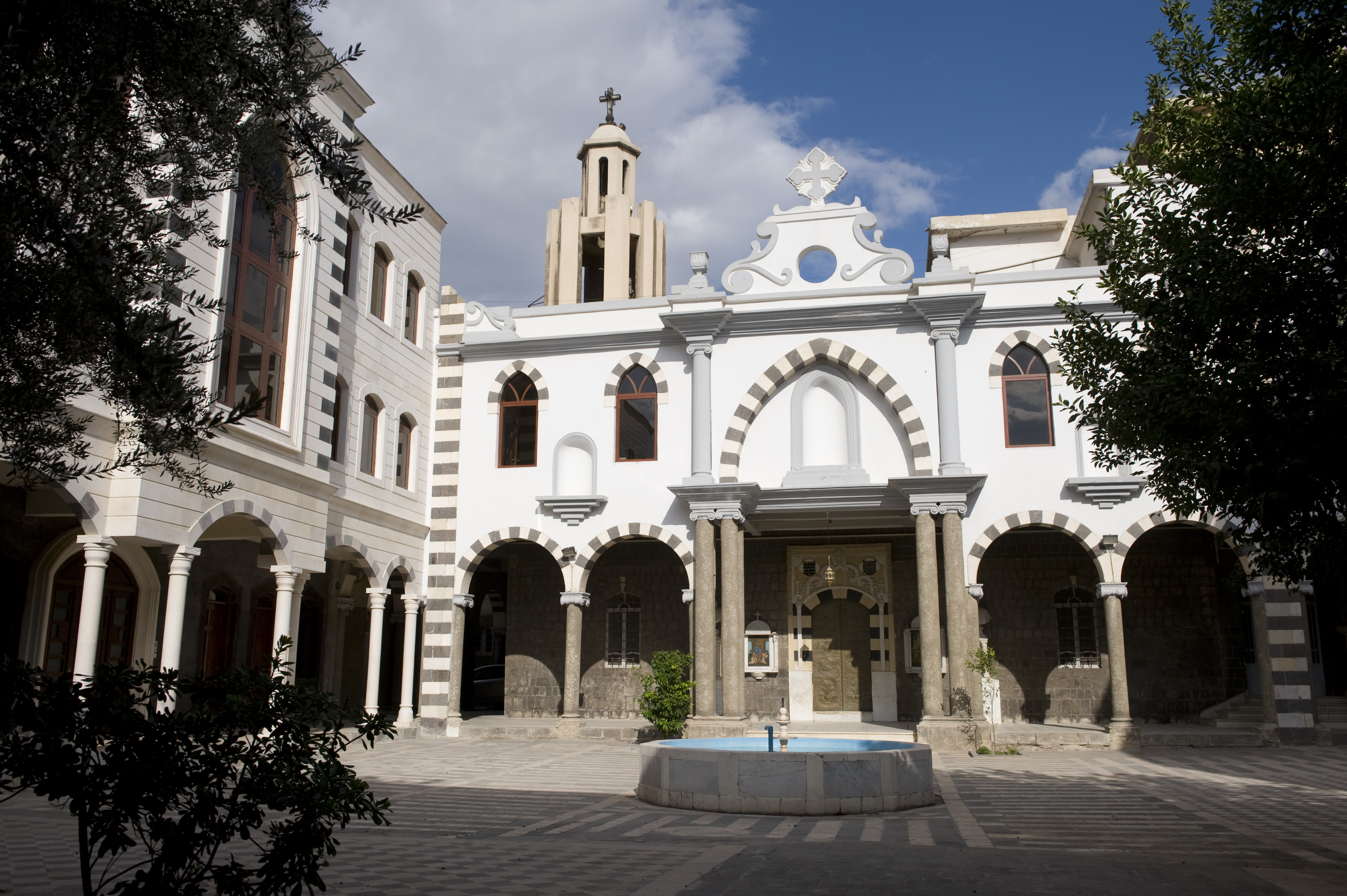
- Syriac Catholic Cathedral of Saint Paul, Damascus, Syria
- Type: Particular church (sui iuris)
- Classification: Christian
- Orientation: Eastern Catholic; Syriac
- Scripture: Peshitta
- Polity: Episcopal
- Pope: Leo XIV
- Patriarch: Ignatius Joseph III Yonan
- Region: Near-East; Lebanon, Syria, Iraq, Turkey with communities in United States, Canada, France, Sweden, Venezuela, Brazil, Argentina and Australia
- Language: Syriac, Aramaic
- Liturgy: West Syriac Rite
- Headquarters: Beirut, Lebanon
- Founder: Traces ultimate origins to Apostles St. Paul and St. Peter Through Patriarchs Ignatius Andrew Akijan (1662) and Ignatius Michael III Jarweh (1782)
- Branched from: Church of Antioch
- Members: 153,415 (2018)
- Official website: syr-cath.org (in Arabic)

The Syriac Catholic Church (Note: Classical Syriac: ܥܕܬܐ ܣܘܪܝܝܬܐ ܩܬܘܠܝܩܝܬܐ, romanized: ʿĪṯo Suryayṯo Qaṯolīqayṯo, Arabic: الكنيسة السريانية الكاثوليكية; Latin: Antiochenus Syrorum) is an Eastern Catholic sui iuris (self-governing) particular church that is in full communion with the Holy See and with the entirety of the Catholic Church. Originating in the Levant, it uses the West Syriac Rite liturgy and has many practices and rites in common with the Syriac Orthodox Church. The Syriac language, a dialect of Aramaic, is the liturgical language used by the church. There are about 160,000 Syriac Catholics, with the majority in Syria and Iraq, along with a smaller community in Lebanon and an overseas diaspora. It is one of the smaller Eastern Catholic churches based in the Middle East.

The Syriac Catholic Church traces its history and traditions to the Church of Antioch established by Saint Peter. The Diocese of the East under the Patriarch of Antioch included the western Middle East along the Mediterranean. The Church of Antioch was split following the Council of Chalcedon in 451 over disagreements on Christology, with the Syriac, Coptic, and Armenian churches becoming part of Oriental Orthodoxy after rejecting the outcome of the council. A decree of unity between the Syriac Orthodox Church and Rome was made at the Council of Florence in 1444 but it was quickly annulled by the Syriac hierarchy. After missionary work led to conversions to Catholicism among Syriac Christians in the 17th century, one of them, Andrew Akijan, was elected as the Syriac Patriarch of Antioch in 1662. After his death in 1677, rival Catholic and Orthodox Syriac patriarchs were elected between then and 1702. The current line of Syriac Catholic patriarchs of Antioch began in 1782, when Michael Jarweh declared himself in communion with the pope of Rome after being elected by the Syriac Orthodox Holy Synod.

The church is headed by Mor Ignatius Joseph III Younan, who has been the patriarch since 2009. Its patriarch of Antioch has the title of Patriarch of Antioch and all the East of the Syriacs and resides in Beirut, Lebanon. (Note: The title of Patriarch of Antioch is also used by four other churches: one Eastern Orthodox, one Oriental Orthodox, and two other Eastern Catholic; the Latin titular patriarchate was abolished in 1964.) The seat of the Syriac Catholic patriarch was moved several times due to persecution of the church. Michael Jarweh established the monastery of Our Lady in Sharfeh, Lebanon, which is also currently the site of the seminary and printing house of the Syriac Catholic Church.

== Name ==
The Syriac Catholic Church (Classical Syriac: ܥܕܬܐ ܣܘܪܝܝܬܐ ܩܬܘܠܝܩܝܬܐ, romanized: ʿĪṯo Suryoyṯo Qaṯolīqayṯo) is sometimes also called the Syrian Catholic Church. Furthermore, it is sometimes referred by its patriarchate, the Syriac Catholic Patriarchate of Antioch. See also: Syriac Catholic Patriarchs of Antioch.

== History ==
=== Pre-Crusades period ===
The Syriac Catholic Church claims its origin through Saint Peter prior to his departure to Rome, and extends its roots back to the origins of Christianity in the Orient; in the Acts of the Apostles we are told that it is in Antioch where the followers of Jesus for the first time were called "Christians" (Acts 11:26).

In the time of the first ecumenical councils, the Patriarch of Antioch held the ecclesiastical authority over the Diocese of the Orient, which was to be extended from the Mediterranean Sea to the Persian Gulf. Its scholarly mission in both languages, Greek and Syriac, was to provide the world and the Universal Church with eminent saints, scholars, hermits, martyrs and pastors. Among these great people are Saint Ephrem (373), Doctor of the Church, and Saint Jacob of Sarug (521).

=== During the Crusades ===
During the Crusades there were many examples of warm relations between Catholic and Syriac Orthodox bishops. Some of these bishops favored union with Rome, but there was no push to unify until a decree of union between the Syriac Orthodox and Rome was signed at the Council of Florence September 30, 1444 – but the effects of this decree were rapidly annulled by opponents of it in the Syriac Church's hierarchy.

=== Split with the Syriac Orthodox Church ===
A Jesuit and Capuchin missionaries evangelizing in Aleppo caused some local Syriac Orthodox faithful to form a pro-catholic movement within the Syriac Orthodox Church. In 1667, Andrew Akijan, a supporter of union with the Catholic Church, was elected as patriarch of the Syriac Orthodox Church. This provoked a split in the community, and after Akijan's death in 1677, two opposing patriarchs were elected, with the pro-Catholic one being the uncle of Andrew Akijan. However, when the Catholic patriarch died in 1702, the Ottoman government supported the Syriac Orthodoxy's agitation against the Syriac Catholics, and throughout the 18th century the Syriac Catholics underwent suffering and much persecution. Due to this, there were long periods when no Syriac Catholic bishops were functioning, so a patriarch could not be elected, and the community was forced to go entirely underground. However, in 1782, the Syriac Orthodox Holy Synod elected Metropolitan Michael Jarweh of Aleppo as patriarch. Shortly after he was enthroned, he declared himself Catholic and in unity with the pope of Rome. After this declaration, Jarweh took refuge in Lebanon and built the still-extant monastery of Our Lady at Sharfeh, and by that act became the patriarch of the Syriac Catholic Church. Since Jarweh, there has been an unbroken succession of Syriac Catholic patriarchs, which is known as the Ignatius line.

=== After the split up until modern times ===
In 1829 the Ottoman government granted legal recognition to the Armenian Catholic Church, and in 1845 the Syriac Catholic Church was also granted its own civil emancipation. Meanwhile, the residence of the patriarch was shifted to Aleppo in 1831. However, after the Massacre of Aleppo in 1850, the patriarchal see was shifted to Mardin in 1854.

After becoming officially recognized by the Ottoman government in 1845, the Syriac Catholic Church expanded rapidly. However, the expansion was ended by the persecutions and massacres that took place during the Sayfo of World War I. After that, the Syriac Catholic patriarchal see was moved to Beirut away from Mardin, to which many Ottoman Christians had fled the genocide. In addition to its see in Beirut, the patriarchal seminary and printing house are located at Sharfeh Monastery in Sharfeh, Lebanon.

The church established a presence in Australia in August 1985, when Monsignor Michael Berbari, a priest who arrived from Egypt and later held the rank of chorbishop, celebrated the first Mass in the Syriac Catholic rite in Australia, in Sydney. Berbari, who served as Patriarchal Vicar of Australia and New Zealand, established the community's first church, Our Lady of Mercy in Concord, opened in 1994. The Sydney parish grew substantially with the arrival of Iraqi refugees following the rise of ISIS, and in 2024 the foundation stone was laid for a new church at Kemps Creek in the presence of Patriarch Ignatius Joseph III Yonan.

== Organization ==
=== Leadership ===
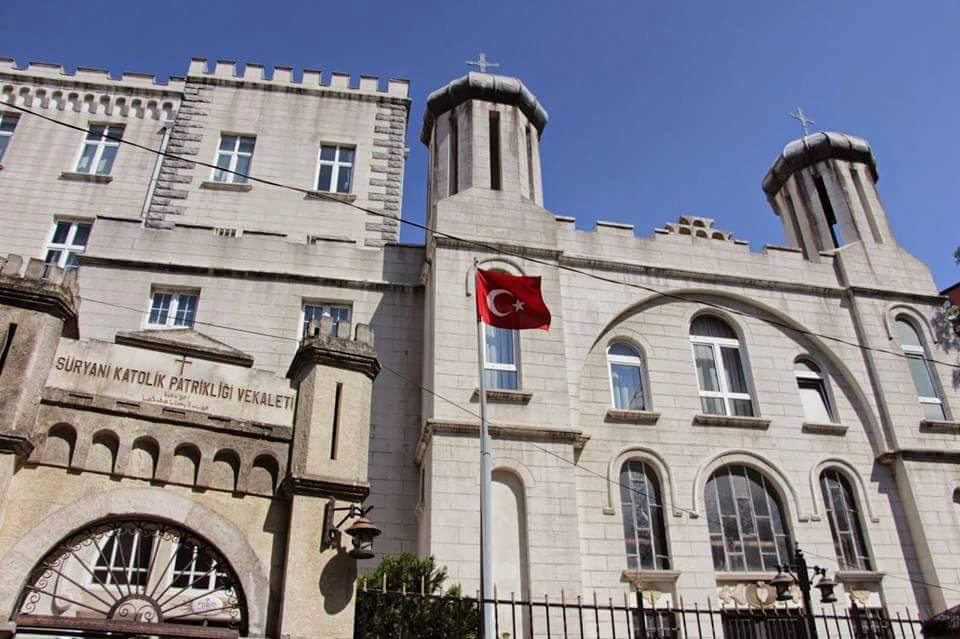
Syriac Catholic Church in Beyoğlu, Istanbul

As of 2013, the patriarch of Antioch (an ancient major see, where several Catholic and Orthodox patriarchates nominally reside) was Moran Mor Ignatius Joseph III Younan, resident in Beirut, Lebanon. The Syriac Catholic patriarch always takes the name "Ignatius" in addition to another name.

In modern history the leaders of the Syriac Catholic Church have been: Patriarch Michael III Jarweh, Archbishop Clemens Daoud, Patriarch Ephrem Rahmani, Vicomte de Tarrazi, Monsignor Ishac Armaleh, Ignatius Gabriel I Tappouni, Chorbishop Gabriel Khoury-Sarkis, Ignatius Antony II Hayyek, Ignatius Moses I Daoud, Ignatius Peter VIII Abdalahad, and Ignatius Joseph III Yonan. Eminent Syriac saints, scholars, hermits, martyrs and pastors since 1100 also include Dionysius Bar Salibi (1171), Gregorius X Bar Hebraeus (1286) and more recently Bishop Mor Flavianus Michael Malke.

The Syriac Church leadership has produced a variety of scholarly writings in a variety of topics. For example, Patriarch Ephrem Rahmani was widely praised for his work in Syriac and is responsible for Pope Benedict XV recognising Saint Ephrem as a Doctor of the Catholic Church. Likewise Patriarch Ignatius Behnam II Beni is known for imploring Eastern theology to defend the primacy of Rome.

The patriarch of Antioch and all the East of the Syriacs presides upon the Patriarchal Eparchy of Beirut and leads spiritually all the Syriac Catholic community around the world.

The community includes two archdioceses in Iraq, four in Syria, one in Egypt and Sudan, a patriarchal vicariate in Palestine, a patriarchal vicariate in Turkey and the Eparchy of Our Lady of Deliverance in the United States and Canada.

=== Current jurisdictions ===
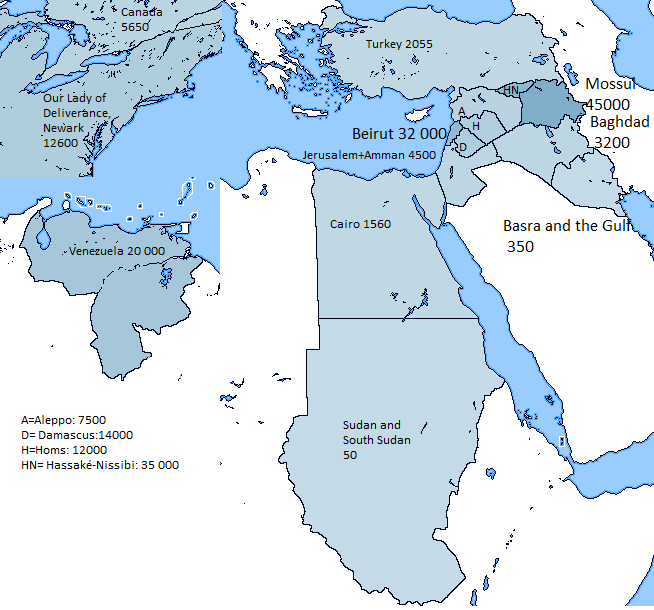
A map of the Syriac Catholic jurisdictions

Middle East diocesan jurisdictions

- Syriac Catholic Patriarch of Antioch
  - Syriac Catholic Patriarchal Eparchy of Beirut, Lebanon
- Metropolitan Syriac Catholic Archeparchy of Damascus, Syria (without suffragan)
- Metropolitan Syriac Catholic Archeparchy of Homs, Syria (without suffragan; titular sees of Hama and Nabk are united with it)
- Syriac Catholic Archeparchy of Aleppo, Syria
- Syriac Catholic Archeparchy of Hassaké-Nisibi, Syria
- Syriac Catholic Archeparchy of Mossul, Iraq
- Syriac Catholic Archeparchy of Baghdad, Iraq
- Syriac Catholic Archeparchy of Hadiab-Erbil, Iraq
- Syriac Catholic Eparchy of Cairo, Egypt
- Syriac Catholic Eparchy of Adiabene, Iraq

Old World missionary jurisdictions

- Syriac Catholic Patriarchal Exarchate of Basra, Iraq and the Gulf
- Syriac Catholic Patriarchal Exarchate of Jerusalem (Palestine and Jordan)
- Syriac Catholic Patriarchal Exarchate of Turkey
- Syriac Catholic Patriarchal Dependency of Sudan and South Sudan (formerly 'of Sudan')

Overseas diaspora

- Syriac Catholic Eparchy of Our Lady of Deliverance in the United States
- Syriac Catholic Apostolic Exarchate for Canada (6 parishes)
- Syriac Catholic Apostolic Exarchate for Venezuela
- Syriac Catholic mission in Australia and New Zealand, under an Apostolic Visitation, with parishes in Sydney and Canberra

=== Former jurisdictions ===
==== Titular sees ====
- Metropolitan : Amida of the Syriacs, Apamea in Syria of the Syriacs, Edessa in Osrhoëne of the Syriacs, Tagritum of the Syriacs
- Archiepiscopal : Chalcedon of the Syriacs
- Episcopal : Anastasiopolis of the Syriacs, Arethusa of the Syriacs, Batnæ of the Syriacs, Dara Syrorum of the Syriacs, Hama of the Syriacs (united with Homs), Hierapolis in Syria of the Syriacs, Ioppe of the Syriacs, Mardin of the Syriacs, Martyropolis of the Syriacs, Nabk of the Syriacs (united with Homs), Phoba of the Syriacs, Tripolis in Libanum of the Syriacs

==== Other suppressed jurisdictions ====
- Syriac Catholic Eparchy of Gazireh, Turkey
- Syriac Catholic Eparchy of Mardin and Amida, Turkey
- Syriac Catholic Patriarchal Exarchate of Lebanon

=== Current hierarchy ===
The present Syriac Catholic episcopate (20 hierarchs as per 30 July 2026) is as follows:

Patriarch:

- Ignatius Joseph III Yonan, Patriarch of Antioch (since 20 January 2009)

Eparchial hierarchs:

- Denys Antoine Chahda, Archbishop of Aleppo (since 2001)
- Yousif Abba, Archbishop of Baghdad (since 2011)
- Youhanna Battah, Archbishop of Damascus (since 2019)
- Nathanael Semaan, Archbishop-bishop of Adiabene (since 2019)
- Yacoub Joseph Chami, Archbishop of Hasakah-Nisibis (since 2022)
- Younan Hano, Archbishop of Mosul (since 2023)
- Julian Yacoub Mourad, Archbishop of Homs (since 2023)
- Yousif Benham Habash, Bishop of Our Lady of Deliverance in the United States (since 2010)
- Antoine Nassif, Bishop, Apostolic Exarch of Canada (since 2016)
- Yaacoub Semaan, Bishop, Patriarchal Exarch of Jerusalem (since 2020)
- Athanasius Firas Dardar, Bishop, Patriarchal Exarch of Basra and the Gulf (since 2020)
- Ephrem Warde, Bishop of Cairo and Patriarchal Vicar of Sudan and South Sudan (since 2022)

Auxiliary and Curial Bishops:

- Basile Georges Casmoussa, Curial Archbishop of Antioch and Apostolic Visitor of Syriac Catholic in Australia (since 2017)
- Matthias Mrad, Curial Bishop of Antioch (since 2018)
- Flaviano Al-Kabalan, Curial Bishop of Antioch and Apostolic Visitor of Syriac Catholic in Western Europe (since 2020)
- Jules Boutros, Curial Bishop of Antioch (since 2022)

Retired hierarchs:

- Raboula Antoine Beylouni, retired Curial Archbishop of Antioch (since 2011)
- Yohanna Petros Mouche, retired Archbishop of Mosul (since 2021)
- Grégoire Pierre Melki, retired Patriarchal Exarch of Jerusalem (since 2019)

As of 2010 the church was estimated to have 159,000 faithful, 10 bishoprics, 85 parishes, 106 secular priests, 12 religious-order priests, 102 men and women in religious orders, 11 permanent deacons and 31 seminarians.

== Liturgy ==
The West Syriac Rite is rooted in the old tradition of both the churches of Jerusalem and Antioch and has ties with the ancient Jewish Berakah.

The Syriac Catholic Church follows a similar tradition to other Eastern Catholic Churches who use the West Syriac Rite, such as the Maronites and Syro-Malankara Christians. This rite is clearly distinct from the Greek Byzantine rite of Antioch of the Melkite Catholics and their Orthodox counterparts. Syriac Catholic priests were traditionally bound to celibacy by the Syriac Catholic local Synod of Sharfeh in 1888, but there are now a number of married priests.

The liturgy of the Syriac Catholic Church is very similar to that of the Syriac Orthodox Church.

=== Liturgical paraphernalia ===
==== Fans ====
The Syriac Catholic Church uses fans with bells on them and engraved with seraphim during the Qurbono. Usually someone in the minor orders would shake these fans behind a bishop to symbolise the seraphim. They are also used during the consecration where two men would shake them over the altar during moments in the epliclesis and words of institution when the priest says "he took and broke" and "this is my body/blood".

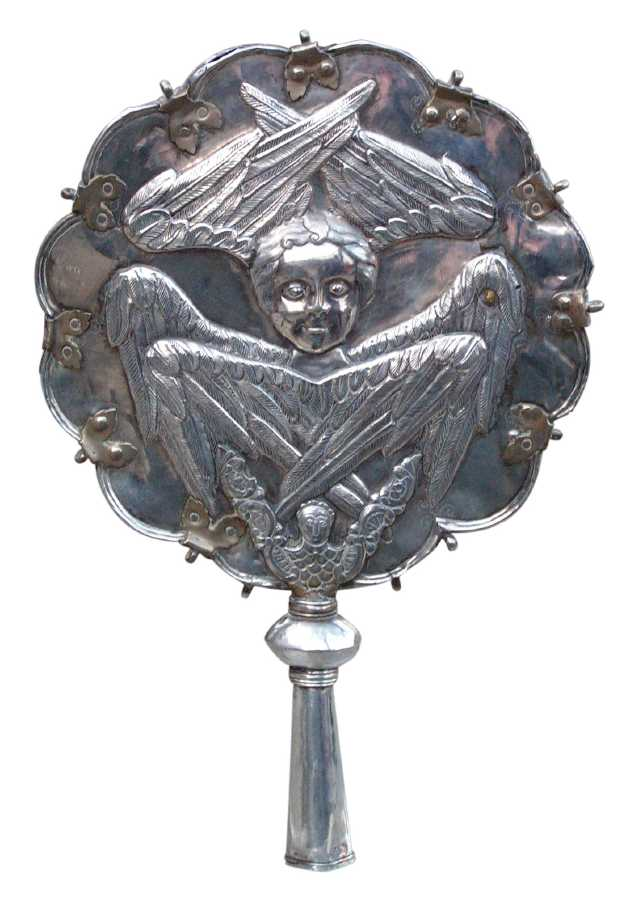
The Syriac Catholic fans look similar to this but with bells on the edges

==== Thurible ====
The thurible of the Syriac Catholic Church consists of nine bells, representing the nine choirs of angels.

=== Liturgy of the Hours ===
The Liturgy of the Hours is exactly the same as in the Syriac Orthodox. There are two versions of this: the Phenqitho and the Shhimo. The former is the more complicated seven-volume version. While the latter is the simple version.

=== Liturgical ranking ===
Likewise the ranking of clerics in the Syriac Catholic Church is extremely similar to that of the Syriac Orthodox Church. The most notable differences are:

- Not all celibate priests take on monastic vows. In the Syriac Orthodox Church all celibate priests are monks.
- There is a solid distinction between the major orders and minor orders in the Syriac Catholic Church:
- A man is tonsured as soon as he receives his first minor order of Mzamrono (Cantor).

==== Major orders ====
- Bishop
- Kahno (Priest)
- Mshamshono (Deacon)

==== Minor orders ====
- Afudyaqno (Sub-deacon)
- Quroyo (Lector)
- Mzamrono (Cantor)

=== Languages ===
The liturgical language of the Syriac Catholic Church, Syriac, is a dialect of Aramaic. The Qurbono Qadisho (literally: Holy Mass or Holy Offering/Sacrifice) of the Syriac Church uses a variety of Anaphoras, with the Anaphora of the 12 Apostles being the one mostly in use with the Liturgy of St James the Just.

Their ancient semitic language is known as Aramaic (or "Syriac" after the time of Christ since the majority of people who spoke this language belonged to the province of "Syria"). It is the language spoken by Jesus, Mary and the Apostles. Many of the ancient hymns of the church are still maintained in this native tongue although several have been translated into Arabic, English, French and other languages.

Syriac is still spoken in some few communities in eastern Syria and northern Iraq, but for most Arabic is the vernacular language.

== Martyrs ==
Throughout the history of the Syriac Church there have been many martyrs. A recent example is Flavianus Michael Malke during the 1915 Sayfo.

=== Syriac Catholics in Iraq ===
On 31 October 2010, 58 Iraqi Syriac Catholics were killed by Muslim extremists while attending Sunday Divine Liturgy; 78 others were wounded. The attack by Iraqi ISIS on the congregation of Our Lady of Deliverance Syriac Catholic Church was the bloodiest single attack on an Iraqi Christian church in recent history.

Two priests, Fathers Saad Abdallah Tha'ir and Waseem Tabeeh, were killed. Another, Father Qatin, was seriously wounded but recovered.

== See also ==
- Christianity in Turkey
- Dioceses of the Syriac Catholic Church
- List of Syriac Catholic Patriarchs of Antioch

== Bibliography ==
- Claude Sélis, Les Syriens orthodoxes et catholiques, Brepols (col. Fils d'Abraham), Bruxelles, 1988, OCLC 20711473
- Jean-Pierre Valognes, Vie et mort des Chrétiens d'Orient, Fayard, Paris, 1994, ISBN 2-213-03064-2
- R Janin, "Le rite syrien et les Églises syriennes" in Revue des études byzantines (1919), pp. 321–341
- Afram Yakoub: The Path to Assyria – A Call For National Renewal. Tigris Press, Södertälje 2020, ISBN 978-91-981541-6-0
