= Ignatius Joseph III Yonan =

Head of the Syriac Catholic Church since 2009

His Beatitude Moran Mor: Ignatius Joseph III Yonan; ܐܓܢܛܝܘܣ ܝܘܣܦ ܬܠܝܬܝܐ ܝܘܢܢ
- Patriarch of Antioch and all the East of the Syrians
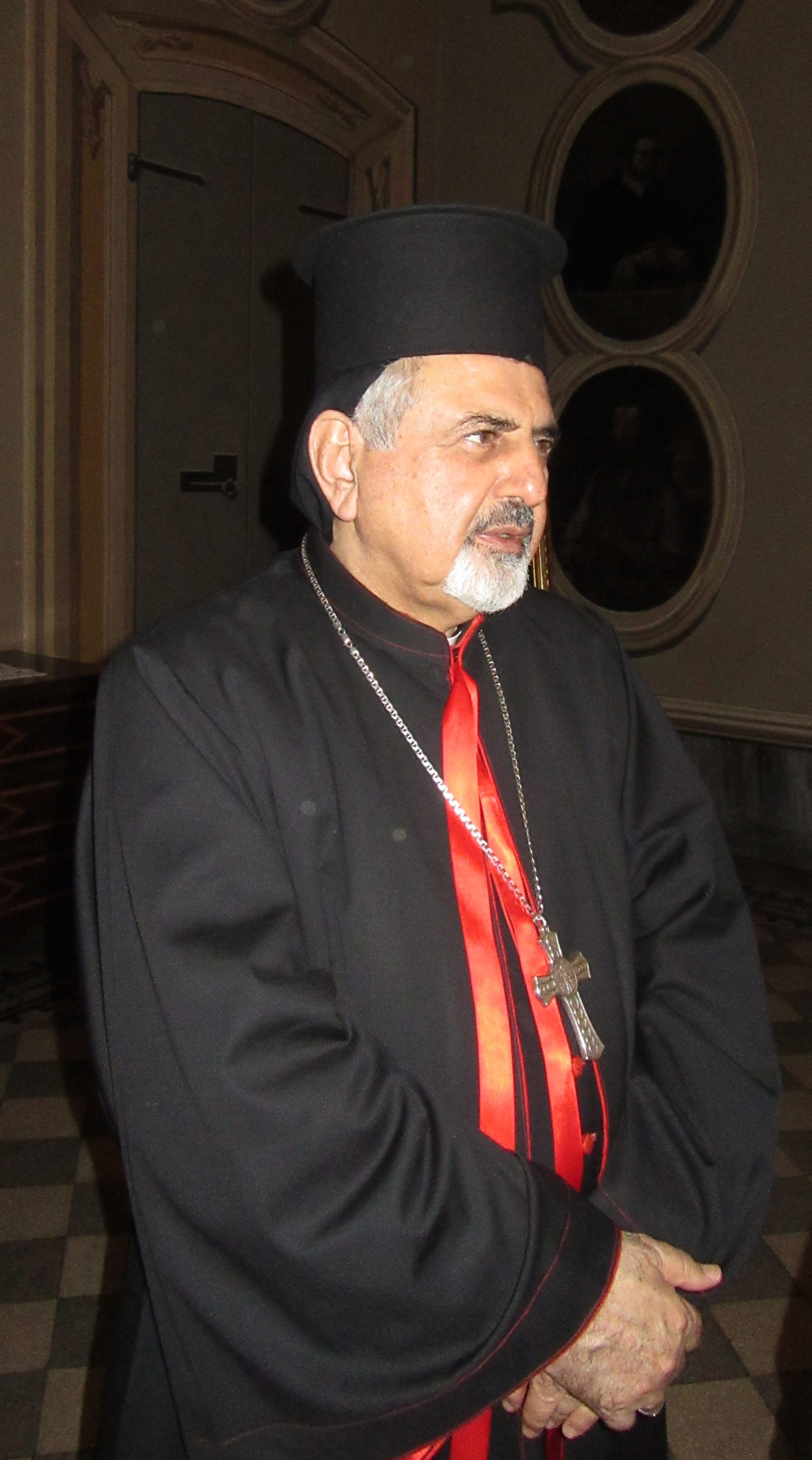
- Ignatius Joseph III Yonan in 2017
- Church: Syriac Catholic Church
- See: Antioch
- Elected: 20 January 2009
- Installed: 15 February 2009
- Term ended: Incumbent
- Predecessor: Ignatius Peter VIII Abdalahad
- Other post: Bishop of Beirut
- Previous post: Bishop of Our Lady of Deliverance of Newark (1995–2009)

Orders
- Ordination: 12 September 1971
- Consecration: 7 January 1996 by Antony II Hayyek

Personal details
- Born: Ephrem Joseph Yonan; 15 November 1944 (age 82) Al-Hasakah, Syria
- Denomination: Catholic Church

Ignatius Joseph III Yonan (or Younan, Syriac: ܐܓܢܛܝܘܣ ܝܘܣܦ ܬܠܝܬܝܐ ܝܘܢܢ, born 15 November 1944) is the Syriac Catholic Patriarch of Antioch and all the East of the Syriacs for the Syriac Catholic Church since his election on 20 January 2009.

== Life ==
Ephrem Joseph Yonan was born at Al-Hasakah, Syria, on 15 November 1944, and was ordained a priest on 12 September 1971. He served as director of the Seminary of Charfet for two years, as Director of Catechesis of the diocese of Hassaké for seven years and as pastor of the Church of the Annunciation in Beirut up to 1986.

In 1986, he was sent to the United States to establish missions for the Assyrian Catholic faithful. He founded a mission in Newark, New Jersey (Our Lady of Deliverance) and others in North Hollywood (Sacred Heart) in 1991, and in San Diego (Our Mother of Perpetual Help) in 1994.

On 6 November 1995, Pope John Paul II erected the Syrian Catholic Eparchy of Our Lady of Deliverance in Newark for all the Assyrian Catholics of the United States and Canada, and appointed Ephrem Joseph Yonan as first eparch (bishop). He was thus consecrated bishop on 7 January 1996, by Ignatius Antony II Hayyek and served in the United States until his election as primate and patriarch for the Syriac Catholic Church on 20 January 2009. Pope Benedict XVI granted him ecclesiastical communion on 22 January 2009, in accordance with Canon 76 § 2 of the Code of Canons of the Eastern Churches.

Along with Cardinal Leonardo Sandri, Prefect of the Congregation for the Oriental Churches, Patriarch Ignatius Joseph III Yonan served as a co-president of the October 2010 Special Assembly of the Synod of Bishops for the Middle East in the Vatican.

In September 2026, Patriarch Ignatius Joseph III Yonan became the first leader of an Eastern Catholic Church to have his leadership challenged under the norms of Mutua concordia. He was challenged following widespread dissatisfaction with his governance for reasons including his reluctance to call governing synods. The meeting determining Yonan's deposition from office will be held in late September or early October 2026.

== Works ==
The patriarch has visited members of his flock in various areas of the diaspora, including Australia and the United States.

Yonan has been very active in the request for the beatification for Flavianus Michael Malke, who was beatified in 2015.

He has continuously called on Western countries to not support insurgents in Syria "just to make the regime of Assad fall", and to find another way to resolve the conflict. He has also condemned them for not caring enough about Middle Eastern Christians.

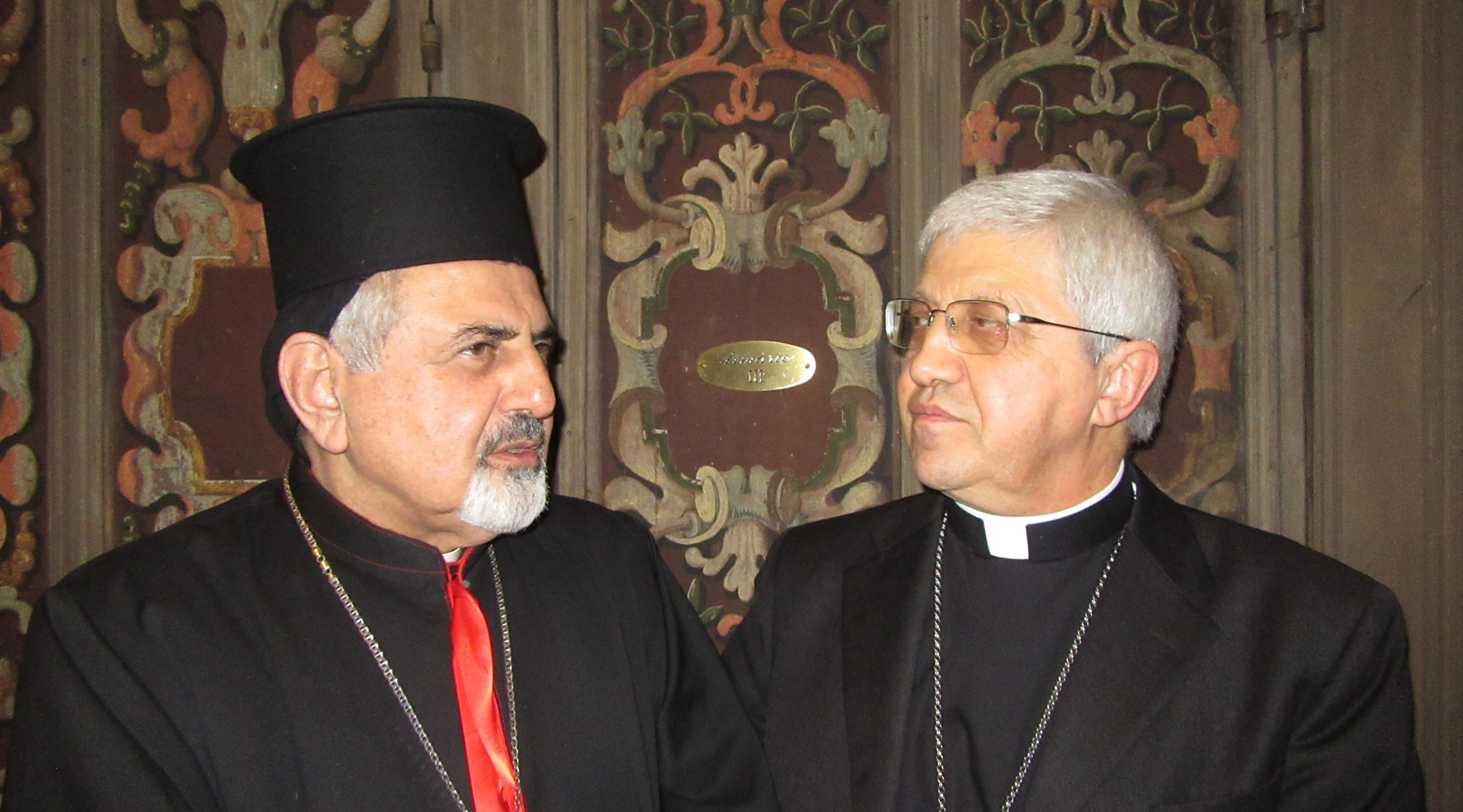
Mons. Maurizio Malvestiti and patriarch Ignatius Joseph III in Lodi, 20 February 2017

== See also ==
- Dioceses of the Syrian Catholic Church
- List of Syriac Catholic Patriarchs of Antioch
- Lists of patriarchs, archbishops, and bishops

== Notes and references ==
Catholic Church titles
Preceded by Ignatius Peter VIII Abdalahad	Patriarch of Antioch of the Syrian Catholic Church; 2009 –	Succeeded by Incumbent
