= Dioceses of the Syriac Catholic Church =

The Syriac Catholic Church, established in the second half of the 17th century as an Eastern Catholic offshoot of the Syriac Orthodox Church, had around a dozen dioceses in the eastern provinces of the Ottoman Empire in the 18th and 19th centuries. Three of these dioceses were ruined during the First World War in the Assyrian and Armenian massacres, and the 20th century also saw the growth of an important Syriac Catholic diaspora in America, Europe and Australasia. As of 2012 the Syriac Catholic Church has fifteen dioceses, mostly in the Middle East, and four patriarchal vicariates for the diaspora communities.

== History ==
During the 18th century the Syriac Catholic church established dioceses in the major cities of the Ottoman Empire with significant West Syriac Catholic communities, and also became the dominant West Syriac grouping in a number of villages in northern Iraq, gaining control of the monastery of Mar Behnam near Mosul.

At the beginning of the 19th century the Syriac Catholic Church had dioceses for Jerusalem, Aleppo, Damascus, Edessa, Amid, Mardin, Gazarta (from 1818), Mosul (from 1790) and the Monastery of Mar Behnam. In 1817 a diocese was created for Beirut, which persisted until 1898. In 1862 a separate diocese was created for Baghdad and Basra, hitherto under the jurisdiction of the bishops of Mosul.

According to a population statistic of 1898, the Syriac Catholic church had just under 23,000 members, organised in nine dioceses.

Like their Syriac Orthodox and Chaldean counterparts, the Syriac Catholic dioceses of Amid, Mardin and Gazarta were ruined in the First World War (Flavian Mikha'il Malke, Syriac Catholic bishop of Gazarta, was killed by the Turks in 1915), and were not afterwards revived. A new Syriac Catholic diocese was established for Hasakah in 1957, and the town has been the seat of a Syriac Catholic bishop since 1959. The diocese of Beirut has remained vacant since 1898, and the relatively small Syriac Catholic community of Beirut has been under the jurisdiction of a patriarchal vicar or apostolic administrator for most of the past eleven decades.

According to a Catholic statistic of 1962, the Syriac Catholic Church had just over 65,000 members in the Middle East at that time, plus a further 15,000 or so members in America and elsewhere.

Table 1: Population of the Syriac Catholic Church, 1962

| Region | No. of Parishes | No. of Churches | No. of Priests | No. of Believers | Region | No. of Parishes | No. of Churches | No. of Priests | No. of Believers |
|---|---|---|---|---|---|---|---|---|---|
| Lebanon | 6 | 6 | 14 | 14,500 | Damascus | 4 | 4 | 5 | 3,807 |
| Egypt | 2 | 3 | 4 | 4,000 | Hims | 12 | 12 | 12 | 4,135 |
| Jordan | 1 | 1 | 2 | 1,200 | Mosul | 8 | 10 | 25 | 17,000 |
| Turkey | 4 | 4 | 2 | 800 | Hassakeh | 7 | 8 | 9 | 4,000 |
| Aleppo | 6 | 2 | 6 | 7,100 | Baghdad | 5 | 5 | 11 | 8,750 |
| | | | | | Total | 55 | 55 | 90 | 65,292 |

According to a Catholic statistic of 1964, the Syriac Catholic Church consisted of a patriarchal archdiocese, four archdioceses (Aleppo, Damascus, Mosul, and Baghdad), two dioceses (Homs and Hama, and Jazira and Euphrates), and six patriarchal vicariates (Lebanon, Egypt, Jordan–Palestine, Mardin, Rome, and Paris).

Table 2: Population of the Syriac Catholic Church, 1964

| Region | No. of Churches | No. of Priests | No. of Believers | Region | No. of Villages | No. of Churches | No. of Believers |
|---|---|---|---|---|---|---|---|
| Lebanon | 8 | 14 | 15,000 | Damascus | 5 | 7 | 4,250 |
| Egypt | 4 | 5 | 4,750 | Mosul | 17 | 24 | 14,000 |
| Jordan and Palestine | 2 | 1 | 1,500 | Baghdad | 8 | 10 | 15,000 |
| Turkey | 5 | 3 | 9,000 | Homs and Hama | 12 | 10 | 5,100 |
| Rome | 1 | 1 | 370 | Mosul | 10 | 25 | 17,000 |
| Paris | 1 | 2 | 3,500 | Jazira and Euphrates | 7 | 9 | 6,400 |
| Aleppo | 5 | 6 | 8,000 | Total | 85 | 117 | 103,870 |

== Present hierarchy ==
The Syriac Catholic Church presently has fifteen dioceses: one patriarchal see (in Beirut); two metropolitanates (Damascus and Homs); four archdioceses (Aleppo, Hassakeh–Nisibis, Baghdad and Mosul); three dioceses (Beirut, Cairo and Our Lady of Deliverance of Newark); one apostolic exarchate (Venezuela); three patriarchal exarchates (Basra and Kuwait, Jerusalem and Turkey); and the patriarchal territory of Sudan. The diocese of Our Lady of Deliverance of Newark covers the United States and there is the Apostolic Exarchate for Canada, while the patriarchal exarchate of Jerusalem covers Israel, Palestine and Jordan.

The Syriac Catholic Church presently has ten bishops and one vacancy:

- Ignatius Joseph III Yonan, Patriarch of Antioch (since January 2009);
- Gregory Eliya Tabe, Metropolitan of Damascus (since June 2001);
- Theophilus Giwargis Kassab, Metropolitan of Homs (since December 1999);
- Dionysius Anton Chahda, Archbishop of Aleppo (since September 2001);
- Yaʿqob Behnam Hindo, Archbishop of Hassakeh–Nisibis (since June 1996);
- Yousif Abba (Yousif Mansoor), Archbishop of Baghdad (since March 2011);
- Father Boutros Moshe, Archbishop of Mosul (since March 2011);
- (Clement Joseph Hannush, Bishop of Cairo since June 1995, died 9 April 2020);
- Yousif Benham Habash, Bishop of the Eparchy of Our Lady of Deliverance of Newark;
- Iwanis Lewis Awad, Apostolic Exarch of Venezuela (since May 2003); and
- Gregory Peter Melki, Patriarchal Exarch of Jerusalem (since February 2002).

Basile Georges Casmoussa, 72, who had been the archbishop of the Archeparchy of Mosul, was transferred to a position in the Syriac Catholic Patriarchal Curia. The Synod of Bishops of the Patriarchal Syriac Catholic Church elected the Protosyncellus (Vicar General) of the Archeparchy of Mosul, Father Boutros Moshe, 67, to be the new archbishop. Pope Benedict XVI, consented to his canonical election on Tuesday, March 1, 2011, sealing the appointment, with ordination and installation to follow at a later date. The Mosul Archeparchy has 35,000 Catholics, 36 priests, and 55 religious.

Also on Tuesday, March 1, 2011, Pope Benedict XVI consented to the canonical election by the Syriac Synod of Bishops of the Father Yousif Abba (Yousif Mansoor), 59, who was the Chancellor of the then Syriac Catholic Eparchy of the United States and Canada under Bishop Habash and served at the St. Joseph Syriac Catholic Church in Mississauga, Ontario, Canada, as the new archbishop-elect of the Syriac Catholic Archeparchy of Baghdad, Iraq. Archbishop Yousif is a native Iraqi. Since 1997, he has been in charge of pastoral care for Syriac Rite Catholics in the United States and Canada. He speaks Syriac, French, Arabic, and English. He succeeds Athanase Mattai Shaba Matoka, who resigned from the position he had held since 1983 as archbishop emeritus, with ordination and installation as archbishop to follow at a later date. The Baghdad Archeparchy has 18,000 Syriac Catholics and seven priests.

Finally, also on March 1, 2011, the Pope approved the canonical election of the Father Jihad Battah, 54, until then the Protosyncellus (Vicar General) of the Syriac Catholic Archeparchy of Damascus, Syria, under Metropolitan Gregory Aliya Tabe, as a bishop-elect of the Syriac Catholic Patriarchal Curia, with ordination and installation as bishop to follow at a later date.

The diocese of Beirut has remained vacant for more than a century. Theophilus Giwargis Kassab, metropolitan of Homs, presently administers the diocese in the capacity of apostolic administrator. The patriarchal exarchate of Basra and Kuwait has been under the care of Father Marzena Eshak since 2003, and the patriarchal exarchate of Turkey has been under the care of Monsignor Joseph Sagh since 1991. Clement Joseph Hannush, bishop of Cairo, has been responsible for the patriarchal territory of Sudan since 1997, in the capacity of protosyncellus.

The church also has four patriarchal vicariates (Brazil, Australia and New Zealand, Sweden and France), and a patriarchal procurate in Rome. In 2010 there were an estimated 159,000 Syriac Catholics, under the care of 11 bishops and over a hundred priests.

== See also ==
- Syriac Catholic Church
- Dioceses of the Syriac Orthodox Church
