= Nathanael Semaan =

Iraqi Syriac Catholic bishop (born 1965)

The Most Reverend Nathanael Nizar Wadih Semaan
- Eparch of Adiabene
- Church: Syriac Catholic Church
- Province: Mosul
- See: Adiabene
- Appointed: 28 June 2019
- Predecessor: (See established)
- Other post: Coadjutor Archbishop of Mosul (2019)

Orders
- Ordination: 1 November 1991 by Jules Mikhael Al-Jamil
- Consecration: 7 June 2019 by Ignatius Joseph III Yonan

Personal details
- Born: Nizar Wadih Semaan; 1 January 1965 (age 61) Qaraqosh, Iraq
- Education: Holy Spirit University of Kaslik, Pontifical Oriental Institute

Nathanael Nizar Wadih Semaan (born 1 January 1965) is an Iraqi Syriac Catholic hierarch, who has served as the first eparch of the Syriac Catholic Eparchy of Adiabene since its creation in June 2019. He previously served as the Coadjutor Archbishop of the Syriac Catholic Archeparchy of Mosul (2019).

== Early life and education ==
Nizar Semaan was born in Qaraqosh (Bakhdida), Iraq, in 1965. After primary and secondary studies he entered the patriarchal seminary of Charfet, Lebanon, where, from 1986 to 1991, he completed his education by studying at the Holy Spirit University of Kaslik. Following his ordination, he later moved to Rome to continue his higher education, where he obtained a doctorate in liturgical sciences from the Pontifical Oriental Institute.

== Priesthood ==
He was ordained to the priesthood on 1 November 1991 for the Archeparchy of Mosul. Following his studies in Rome, he served the Syriac Catholic diaspora in Great Britain starting in 2005, providing pastoral care for the community there until his appointment to the episcopate.

== Episcopate ==
On 27 March 2019, Pope Francis confirmed his election by the Synod of the Syriac Catholic Church as the Coadjutor Archbishop of Mosul. He was consecrated as a bishop on 7 June 2019 by Patriarch Ignatius Joseph III Yonan.

Only a few months later, on 28 June 2019, the Synod of the Syriac Catholic Church, with the approval of Pope Francis, established the new Syriac Catholic Eparchy of Adiabene with its see in Erbil. Semaan was named its first eparchial bishop.

As eparch, he has been a vocal advocate for the Christian community in the Kurdistan Region of Iraq, focusing on the pastoral needs of those displaced from the Nineveh Plains following the occupation by ISIS.

== See also ==
- Syriac Catholic Church
- Catholic Church in Iraq
