= Archeparchy of Mosul =

The term Archeparchy of Mosul may refer to:

- Archeparchy of Mosul (Church of the East), a historical archeparchy (archdiocese) of the Church of the East, in Mosul (Iraq)
- Chaldean Catholic Archeparchy of Mosul, an archeparchy (archdiocese) of the Chaldean Catholic Church, in Mosul (Iraq)
- Syrian Catholic Archeparchy of Mosul, an archeparchy (archdiocese) of the Syrian Catholic Church, in Mosul (Iraq)

== See also ==
- Mosul
- Archeparchy of Erbil (disambiguation)
- Archeparchy of Baghdad (disambiguation)
- Archeparchies of the Church of the East
