= Yousif Abba =

Iraqi archbishop

Ephrem Yousif Abba Mansoor
- Archbishop of Baghdad, Iraq
- Elected: June 26, 2010
- In office: 2011 – Present
- Predecessor: Athanase Matti Shaba Matoka

Orders
- Ordination: June 30, 1978 by Emmanuel Daddi
- Consecration: April 16, 2011

Personal details
- Born: June 18, 1951 (age 75) Bakhdida, Iraq

Ephrem Yousif Abba Mansoor (born June 18, 1951, Bakhdida, Iraq) is an Iraqi Syriac Catholic hierarch and the current archbishop of Baghdad.

== Life ==
Abba received his priestly ordination from Emmanuel Daddi, the former Archbishop of Mosul, on June 30, 1978. He was the chancellor of the Syriac Catholic Church leadership in the United States and Canada.

He was elected Archbishop of Baghdad on June 26, 2010, by the Holy Synod of the Syriac Catholic Church. Pope Benedict XVI consented to the election on March 1, 2011. The Syriac Catholic Patriarchate of Antioch, Ignatius Joseph III Younan, sponsored his episcopal ordination on April 16 of the same year. His Co-Consecrators were his predecessors, Athanase Matti Shaba Matoka, Jules Mikhael Al-Jamil, and the curia Archbishop of the Patriarchate of Antioch, and the emeritus Archbishop of Mosul, Basile Georges Casmoussa.

== See also ==
- Catholic Church in Iraq

Catholic Church titles
Preceded by Athanase Matti Shaba Matoka	Archbishop of Baghdad; 2011 – present	Succeeded by Incumbent
