= Athanasius Firas Dardar =

Iraqi Syriac Catholic bishop (born 1975)

Most Reverend Athanasius Firas Mundher Dardar
- Patriarchal Exarch of Basra and the Gulf and Titular Bishop of Tagritum for the Syrians
- Native name: فراس دردر
- Church: Syriac Catholic Church
- Appointed: 10 September 2020
- Predecessor: Emad Mochael Al-Banna (as Apostolic Administrator)

Orders
- Ordination: 30 April 2009 by Basile Georges Casmoussa
- Consecration: 30 October 2020 by Ignatius Joseph III Yonan

Personal details
- Born: Firas Mundher Dardar; 3 January 1975 (age 51) Qaraqosh, Iraq
- Education: University of Baghdad, Pontifical University of the Holy Cross

Athanasius Firas Mundher Dardar (also spelled Drdr; born 3 January 1975) is an Iraqi Syriac Catholic hierarch, who has served as the Patriarchal Exarch of Basra and the Gulf and Titular Bishop of Tagritum for the Syrians since 2020.

== Biography ==
=== Early life and priesthood ===
Firas Mundher Dardar was born in Qaraqosh (Bakhdida), Iraq. In 1997, he obtained a degree in Fine Arts from the University of Baghdad. He pursued his initial ecclesiastical studies at the Charfet Seminary in Lebanon before moving to Rome. He was ordained a priest on 30 April 2009 for the Syriac Catholic Patriarchal Eparchy of Beirut.

Following his ordination, he continued his academic pursuits in Rome, obtaining a licentiate in Social Communications from the Pontifical University of the Holy Cross. During his time in Europe, he also served as a chaplain for Syriac Catholic diaspora communities.

=== Episcopal Ministry ===
On 10 September 2020, following the election by the Synod of the Syriac Catholic Church and the subsequent confirmation by Pope Francis, Dardar was appointed Patriarchal Exarch of the Syriac Catholic Patriarchal Exarchate of Basra and the Gulf. He was assigned the titular see of Tagritum.

He was consecrated bishop on 30 October 2020 at the Church of the Immaculate Conception in Qaraqosh. The principal consecrator was the Syriac Catholic Patriarch of Antioch, Ignatius Joseph III Yonan, assisted by other high-ranking members of the Syriac Catholic hierarchy. Upon his consecration, he assumed the episcopal name Athanasius.

Since his appointment, Dardar has been active in revitalizing the Christian presence in southern Iraq. He was involved in initiatives to relaunch pilgrimages to Ur of the Chaldeans following the historic visit of Pope Francis to Iraq in 2021. He participates regularly in the Annual Ordinary Synod of the Syriac Catholic Church at the Patriarchal See in Lebanon.

== See also ==
- Syriac Catholic Church
- Catholic Church in Iraq
