= Younan Hano =

Iraqi Syriac Catholic bishop (born 1982)

Monsignor Younan Hano
- Archbishop of Mosul
- Church: Syriac Catholic Church
- Archdiocese: Archeparchy of Mosul
- Appointed: 7 January 2023
- Predecessor: Yohanna Petros Mouche

Orders
- Ordination: 29 June 2011 by Yohanna Petros Mouche
- Consecration: 3 February 2023 by Ignatius Joseph III Yonan

Personal details
- Born: Benedict Qusay Mubarak Abdullah Hano; 10 September 1982 (age 43) Qaraqosh, Iraq
- Education: Holy Spirit University of Kaslik, Pontifical Oriental Institute

Younan Benedict Qusay Mubarak Abdullah Hano (born 10 September 1982) is an Iraqi hierarch of the Syriac Catholic Church who has served as the Archbishop of Mosul since 2023. At the time of his appointment, he was noted as the youngest Catholic bishop in the world.

== Early life and education ==
Younan Hano was born in Qaraqosh, Iraq. He initially studied nursing before entering the seminary. He completed his philosophical and theological studies at the Holy Spirit University of Kaslik in Lebanon. In 2019, he moved to Rome to pursue a doctorate in Biblical Theology at the Pontifical Oriental Institute.

== Priesthood ==
Hano was ordained a deacon on 20 December 2010 by Archbishop Basile Georges Casmoussa. He was ordained to the priesthood on 29 June 2011 for the Archeparchy of Mosul by Archbishop Youhanna Boutros Moshe.

During his ministry, he served as:

- Vicar of the Mar Jacob parish in Qaraqosh.
- Secretary to the Archbishop of Mosul.
- Protosyncellus (Vicar General) of the Archeparchy.
- Representative of the Syriac Catholic Church to the Middle East Council of Churches.

During the ISIS occupation of the Nineveh Plains, Hano worked extensively with internally displaced persons (IDPs) at the Mar Shmoni Church in Erbil.

== Episcopal ministry ==
Following the election by the Synod of Bishops of the Syriac Catholic Church, Pope Francis granted his assent to Hano's appointment as Archbishop of Mosul on 7 January 2023. He was consecrated on 3 February 2023 by Patriarch Ignatius Joseph III Yonan at the Cathedral of the Immaculate Conception in Qaraqosh.

In late 2023, Archbishop Hano became a prominent voice for the Christian community following the Qaraqosh wedding fire, calling for international transparency in the subsequent investigations.
