= Archeparchy of Erbil =

The term Archeparchy of Erbil may refer to:

- Archeparchy of Erbil (Church of the East), a historical archeparchy (archdiocese) of the Church of the East, in Erbil (Iraq)
- Chaldean Catholic Archeparchy of Erbil, an archeparchy (archdiocese) of the Chaldean Catholic Church, in Erbil (Iraq)

== See also ==
- Erbil
- Archeparchy of Mosul (disambiguation)
- Archeparchy of Baghdad (disambiguation)
- Archeparchies of the Church of the East
