= Athanase Matti Shaba Matoka =

Iraqi Syriac Catholic archbishop (1930–2025)

Most Reverend Athanase Matti Shaba Matoka
- Archbishop Emeritus of Baghdad
- Native name: أثناسيوس متي شابا متوكا
- Church: Syriac Catholic Church
- Appointed: 15 July 1983
- Term ended: 26 June 2010
- Predecessor: Athanase Jean Daniel Bakose
- Successor: Yousif Abba
- Other post: Patriarchal Exarch of Basra and the Gulf (1997–2001)
- Previous posts: Auxiliary Bishop of Baghdad and Titular Bishop of Dara for the Syrians (1979–1983)

Orders
- Ordination: 17 October 1954
- Consecration: 8 December 1979 by Ignatius Antony II Hayyek

Personal details
- Born: Matti Shaba Matoka; 20 June 1930 Bartella, Kingdom of Iraq
- Died: 19 March 2025 (aged 94) Beirut, Lebanon

Athanase Matti Shaba Matoka (20 June 1930 – 19 March 2025) was an Iraqi Syriac Catholic hierarch, who served as the Archbishop of the Syriac Catholic Archeparchy of Baghdad from 1983 until his retirement in 2010. He was a significant figure during the period of heightened persecution of Christians in Iraq following the 2003 invasion.

== Biography ==
Matti Shaba Matoka was born in Bartella, Iraq. He entered the local seminary and was ordained a priest on 17 October 1954.

On 25 August 1979, he was appointed Auxiliary Bishop of Baghdad and Titular Bishop of Dara for the Syrians. He received his episcopal consecration on 8 December 1979 from Patriarch Ignatius Antony II Hayyek. Following the death of Archbishop Athanase Jean Daniel Bakose, he was elected Archbishop of Baghdad on 15 July 1983.

Also in 1997–2001 he served as the Patriarchal Exarch of Basra and the Gulf.

=== 2010 Cathedral attack ===
Matoka was the ordinary of Baghdad during the 31 October 2010 attack on the Syriac Catholic Cathedral of Our Lady of Deliverance (Sayidat al-Nejat). The siege resulted in the deaths of over 50 people, including two young priests. In the aftermath, Pope Benedict XVI sent a personal message of condolence to Matoka, expressing his closeness to the suffering Iraqi Christian community.

=== Retirement and death ===
Matoka resigned his see on 26 June 2010 upon reaching the age limit. He was succeeded by Yousif Abba. Even in retirement, he remained an influential spiritual leader for the Syriac diaspora. He died in Beirut, Lebanon on 19 March 2025, at the age of 94.

== See also ==
- Syriac Catholic Church
- Christianity in Iraq
