= Syriac Catholic Eparchy of Adiabene =

Syriac Catholic eparchy in Erbil, Iraq

Eparchy of Syriac Catholic Eparchy of Adiabene Eparchia Adiabenensis Syrorum

catholic

Location
- Territory: Erbil Governorate, Dohuk Governorate and Sulaymaniyah Governorate
- Metropolitan: Archeparchy of Mosul

Information
- Denomination: Catholic Church
- Sui iuris church: Syriac Catholic Church
- Rite: Syriac Rite
- Established: 28 June 2019
- Cathedral: Cathedral of the Queen of Peace, Erbil

Current leadership
- Pope: Leo XIV
- Patriarch: Ignatius Joseph III Yonan
- Eparch: Nathanael Semaan

The Syriac Catholic Eparchy of Adiabene (Latin: Eparchia Adiabenensis Syrorum) is an eparchy of the Syriac Catholic Church located in Erbil, the capital of the Kurdistan Region of Iraq. It is a suffragan see of the Syriac Catholic Archeparchy of Mosul.

== History ==
The eparchy was established on 28 June 2019 by the Synod of the Syriac Catholic Church, with the assent of Pope Francis. Its territory was carved out of the Syriac Catholic Archeparchy of Mosul, which had previously exercised jurisdiction over the faithful in the Erbil Governorate, Dohuk Governorate and Sulaymaniyah Governorate.

The creation of the eparchy was a response to the significant demographic shift following the 2014 offensive by the Islamic State, which caused thousands of Syriac Catholic families to flee the Nineveh Plains and seek refuge in the Erbil suburb of Ankawa. Recognizing the permanent nature of many of these displacements and the growing community in the Kurdistan Region, the Church leadership elevated the region to a distinct eparchy.

The name "Adiabene" refers to the ancient kingdom centered in Erbil, which was a historic center of Syriac Christianity.

== Eparchial hierarchs ==
- Nathanael Semaan (28 June 2019 – present): Previously served as Coadjutor Archbishop of Mosul before being named the first Eparch of Adiabene.

== Statistics ==
As of its founding in 2019, the eparchy serves the Syriac Catholic faithful residing in the Erbil Governorate. Its primary place of worship is the Cathedral of the Queen of Peace in Ankawa.

== See also ==
- Catholic Church in Iraq
- Syriac Catholic Church
- List of Catholic dioceses in Iraq
