= Yohanna Petros Mouche =

Iraqi Syriac Catholic prelate (born 1943)

- Archeparch Emeritus of Mosul
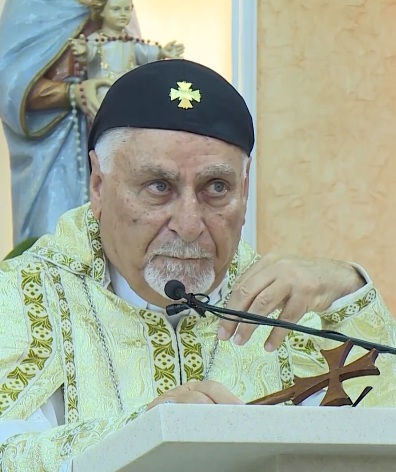
- Yohanna Petros Mouche talks to the displaced Iraqi Christians settled in Jordan, 24 August 2019
- Native name: يوحنا بطرس موشي
- Church: Syriac Catholic Church
- Archdiocese: Archeparchy of Mosul
- In office: 1 March 2011 – 18 September 2021
- Predecessor: Basile Georges Casmoussa
- Successor: Younan Hano

Orders
- Ordination: 9 June 1968 by Emmanuel Daddi
- Consecration: 16 April 2011 by Ignatius Joseph III Yonan

Personal details
- Born: 23 November 1943 (age 82) Bakhdida, Mosul Governorate, Kingdom of Iraq

Yohanna Petros Mouche (born November 23, 1943) is an Iraqi Syriac Catholic prelate. He served as the Archbishop of Mosul.

== Early life ==
Yohanna Petros Mouche was born on November 23, 1943, in Bakhdida, Nineveh Governorate, Iraq. He was ordained as a priest on June 6, 1968.

== Career ==
Mouche was elected as the Archbishop of Mosul in 2011.

In August 2011, he blamed the bombing of the Holy Family Church in Kirkuk on government infighting, concluding that officials were too busy arguing among themselves to keep the country safe.

In August 2014, he visited Christian refugees in Soran, Kurdistan
