= John of Dailam =

Saint John of Dailam
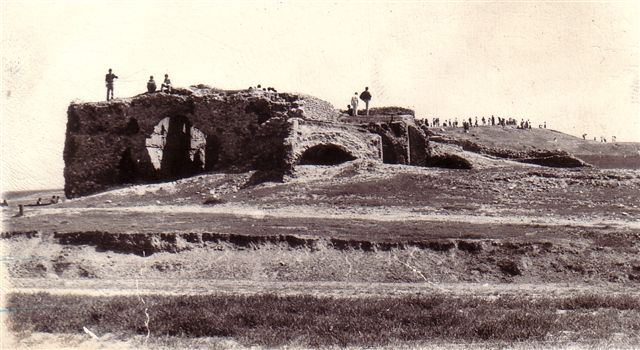
- One of St. John's monasteries, in Iraq, 1921
- Born: 660; Hdatta, Iraq
- Died: 26 January 738
- Venerated in: Syriac Christianity
- Major shrine: Monastery of Saint John of Dailam, Bakhdida, Iraq
- Feast: Last Friday of March West Syriac Churches; 3rd Friday after the Epiphany East Syriac Churches

Saint John of Dailam (Syriac: ܝܘܚܢܢ ܕܝܠܡܝܐ Yoḥannan Daylamáyá), was a 7th-century East Syriac Christian saint and monk, who founded several monasteries in Mesopotamia and Persia.

According to the hagiographical Syriac Life of John of Dailam, John was born in Ḥdattā, a town on the confluence of the Upper Zab and the Tigris, in AD 660. He joined the monastery of Bēṯ ʿĀbē at a young age. He was later captured by the Dailamites who were at war with the invading Arabs and was carried away to the Daylam region in southern shores of the Caspian Sea. He broke away from captivity and went on preaching in the area spreading Christianity among its inhabitants.

The Syriac Life describes a miraculous intervention by John that saved the life of the daughter of the Umayyad Caliph. As a reward the monk asked for a Kharaj-free land in Fars, in south-western Persia, to build a monastery there. The Syriac Life mentions a visit by John to Bakhdida where he converted its inhabitants to Christianity and founded a monastery which still bears his name. This is however a later addition to the hagiography by a West Syrian author who wished to conceal the "Nestorian" past of the town.

On his way to Fars, John miraculously healed the Arab governor of Iraq al-Hajjaj. Upon reaching Arrajan, he converted a number of Zoroastrians and founded a monastery there. He also founded another monastery near Kashkar which was assigned to the Syriac-speaking community in order to resolve a conflict between the Syriac- and Persian-speaking monks of the region. It was at that monastery that John of Dailam died on 26 January 738.
