= Sayidat al-Nejat Cathedral =

Syriac-Catholic cathedral in Baghdad, Iraq

Coordinates: 33.3069°N 44.4258°E

- Arabic: كاتدرائية سيدة النجاة
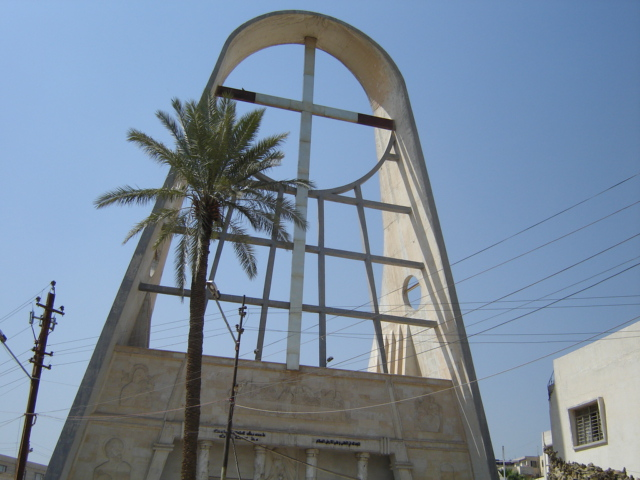
- Sayidat al-Nejat Cathedral
- Location: Baghdad
- Country: Iraq
- Denomination: Syriac Catholic Church

Architecture
- Completed: 1968

Clergy
- Bishop: Yousif Abba

The Sayidat al-Nejat Cathedral in Baghdad (Arabic: كاتدرائية سيدة النجاة) is a Cathedral of the Syriac or Antiochian Catholic Church located in Baghdad, Iraq. The current bishop is Archbishop Yousif Abba and the cathedral is 380 meters from the Cathedral of Our Lady of Nareg. The church was subject of attack by ISIS in 2010 and in 2004.

== History ==
=== Background ===
The Syriac-Catholic presence in Baghdad started at the beginning of the 19th century but grew in the following century due to the Armenian Genocide and the later economic development of the city during the Royal Era. Due to this presence and the many Christian families moving into Baghdad's newer areas, including Karada where the cathedral is located, a primitive but modest Church was built in 1952 before the current cathedral was erected while the primitive Church was turned into a place for condolences, used during mourning periods. The cathedral was designed by a Polish man named Kafka with the help of the Romaya engineering agency. The cathedral was opened on March 17, 1968, in the presence of various bishops of the Christian communities in Iraq.

After the fall of former Iraqi president Saddam Hussein in 2003, the cathedral was among the many churches that were bombed and was a part of the 2004 attacks on Iraqi churches.

=== 2010 massacre ===
On October 31, 2010, a group of suicide bomber militants of a group called Islamic State of Iraq took over and attacked the cathedral during Sunday evening Mass. The militants massacred 47 people including men, women and children including two priests, Thaier Abdullah and Wassim Sabieh, and causing tens to be injured. The dead corpses of the victims covered the floors of the cathedral and the walls were full of bullet holes. The gunmen demanded the release of various al-Qaeda prisoners. The situation ended only when security forces stormed the cathedral in an hours-long stand-off. About 60 people were injured in this stand-off. Huthaifa al-Batawi, a senior al-Qaeda chief, was suspected in this attack but ISI quickly took credit for the attack. Al-Batawi, along with 11 others, were accused of masterminding the attacks and was imprisoned. The final death toll after the stand-off was 67 dead people who were killed during the process. After the stand-off, Mgr Pios Cacha, a member of the cathedral, entered the building and took pictures of every single dead victim, one by one. The attack was the first of the many attacks on Iraqi Christians after 2003 that gained awareness globally of the situation. The attack caught the attention of Pope Benedict XVI who condemned the attack and called for cooperation for peace in the region.

The attack was expected by Father Thaier Abdullah due to the Dove World Outreach Center Quran burnings by Reverend Terry Jones on September 11, 2010, which caused massive outrage and anti-Christian hatred. Due to the cathedral being a well-known landmark, Father Thaier and the people of the cathedral were reported to be preparing for the worst but tried to remain calm. A police car sat outside the cathedral right across the road and concrete bollards, razor wire, and oil drums filled with cement barricaded the entrance. Much of this preparation came from the legacy of the 2004 attack on the cathedral. Father Thaier also said in an interview:

I would like to send a message to the pastor who is in America; he lives in a society that protects humans and religious beliefs. Why would he want to harm Christians in Iraq? This is dangerous. He should realize that we live in cultures of various denominations, especially in Iraq.

=== Later events ===
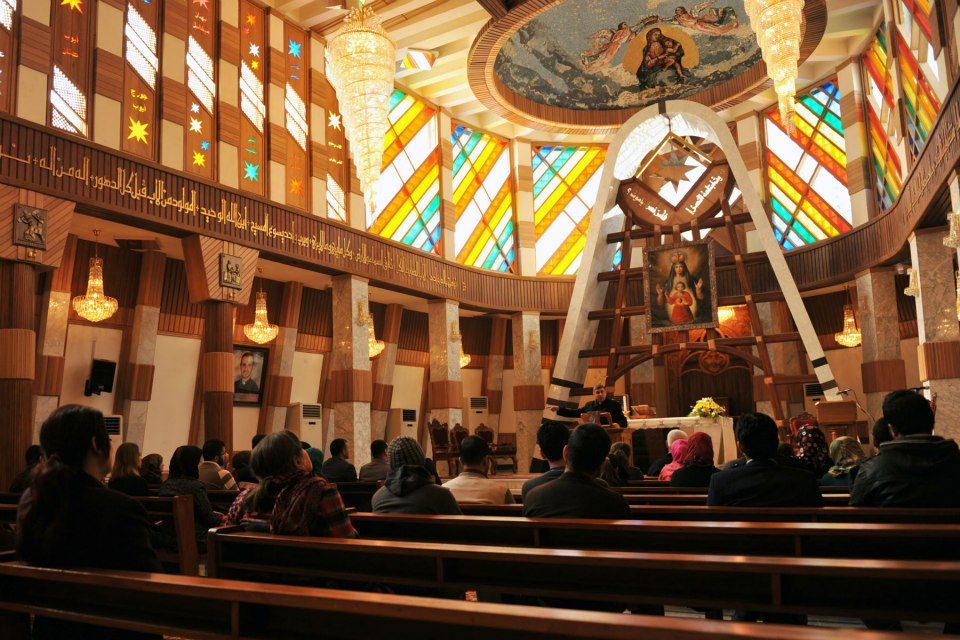
The interior of the cathedral after the restoration effort.

In 2011, works on the complete renovation and restoration of the cathedral began as decided by Mgr Matti Shaba Matoka, archbishop of Baghdad. On December 14, 2012, the cathedral was inaugurated in the presence of nearly all Eastern Christian patriarchs at the time. A memorial has been erected in an adjacent room, where pictures of the victims and sullied sacred objects can be seen, as well as memorial personal belongings of Fathers Thaier Abdullah and Wassim Sabieh. Today, the Cathedral remains one of the three active Syriac-Catholic Churches in Baghdad.

On February 10, 2018, the Syriac Catholics of Baghdad celebrated the World Day of the Sick. Mass was carried out by Mgr Yousif Abba, the Syriac-Catholic archbishop of Baghdad. The people at the celebration were blessed with the Holy Chrism including the people who were sick that day. At the end of the mass, a “queen of patience” of the cathedral was chosen to be a heavily physically and mentally disabled person named "Nour." On March 5, 2021, Pope Francis visited the cathedral during his visit to Iraq and was given a bouquet of flowers upon his arrival .

Despite this, the legacy of the 2010 massacre is still remembered by some. According to church statics, Christian presence in Iraq declined to its lowest level after the attack to less than 500,000. Some Christians, monasteries and churches also became targets during the external political conflicts the country saw in later years.

== Architecture and description ==
The Polish architect and designer Kafka intentionally designed the cathedral in the shape of a boat, with its large cross raised as a mast, supporting an arch-shaped sail. The obvious evangelical symbol is supposed to represent a boat carrying worshippers on board, just like Jesus on the boat with his disciples. Mgr Pios Cacha quoted “Our church is a boat sailing in the world’s sea." In the interior, wood paneling covers all the inside pillars and walls with a wooden band above the nave that includes the names of the victims carved on said wood. Above the altar are multicolored windows give the cathedral a natural lighting. On the arch above the altar in the church's choir, hangs a painting of the Virgin Mary with a baby Jesus, carrying her son on her heart; the painting was drawn by Chaldean priest Mikhael Oufi in Roma in 1904. The painting suffered no deterioration during the 2011 massacre. In the cupola, above the choir, is a mosaic picture made of earthenware tiles features the coronation of Mary. The mosaic work was made by an unnamed Muslim artist in 1994. Next to the cathedral is a graveyard that contains tombs of the cathedral's servants and clerics. As well as the tombs of Fathers Thaier Abdullah and Wassim Sabieh with their names embedded on a wall.

== See also ==
- Christianity in Iraq
- List of Churches in Baghdad
