= Martyrs of Damascus =

Catholic martyrs and saints

Saints Martyrs of Damascus The Massabki Brothers, Manuel Ruiz, and 7 Companions
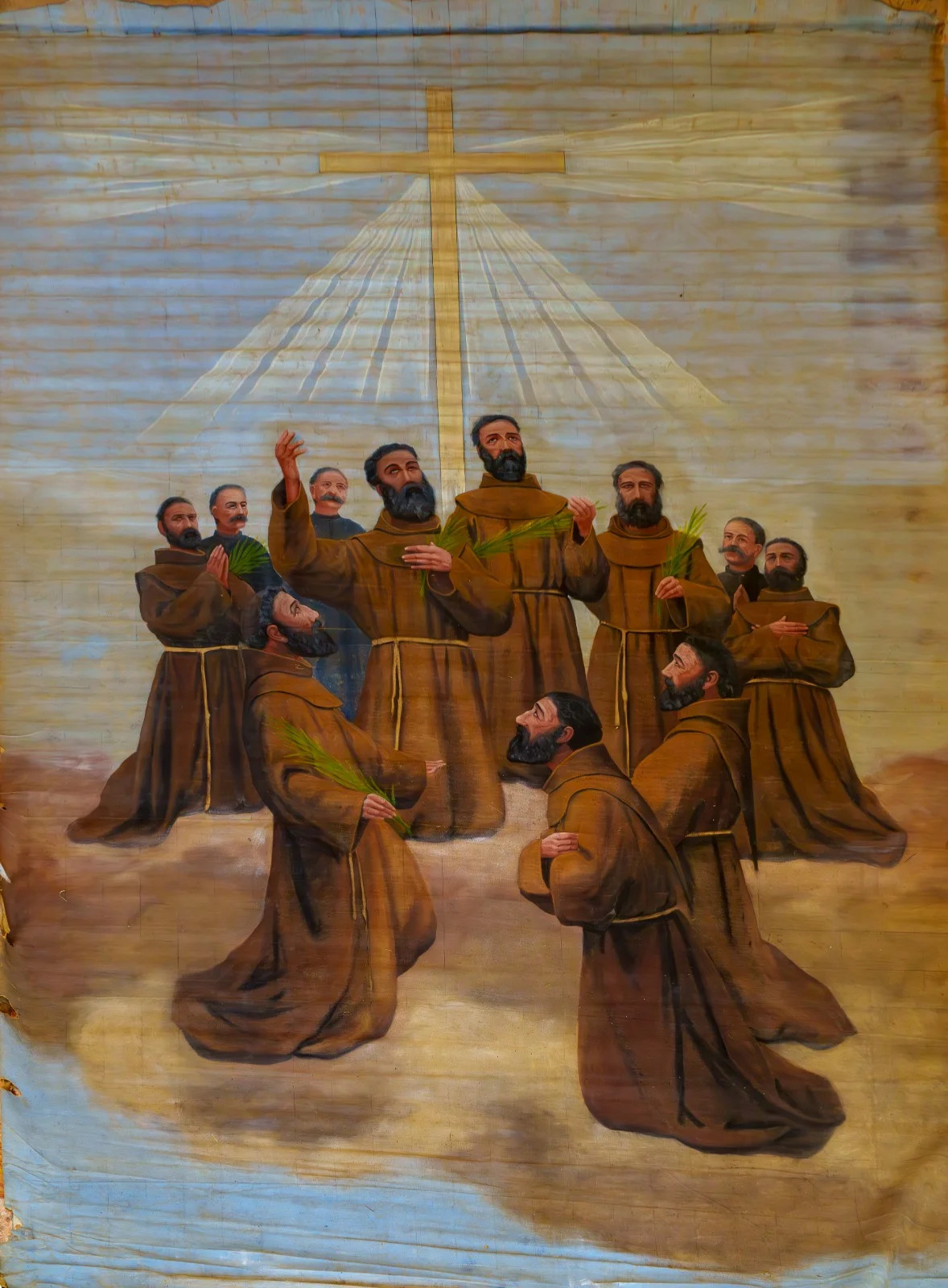
- Official Portrait of the Eleven Martyrs of Damascus, including eight Franciscans and the Massabki brothers.

Priests, Religious (Francisco and Juan), Laymen (Massabki Brothers); Martyrs
- Born: Manuel Ruiz López; Carmelo Bolta Bañuls; Nicanor Ascanio Soria; Nicolás María Alberca Torres; Pedro Nolasco Soler Méndez; Engelbert Kolland; Francisco Pinazo Peñalver; Juan Jacob Fernández; Fransīs Masābkī 'Abd-al-Mu'tī Masābkī; Rūfayīl Masābkī; 1802-1830; Spain; Salzburg, Austria (Engelbert); and Damascus, Syria (Massabki Brothers)
- Died: 10 July 1860; Damascus, Syria
- Cause of death: Beheading, clubbing, stabbing by Druze
- Venerated in: Catholic Church
- Beatified: 10 October 1926, Saint Peter's Basilica, Rome, Kingdom of Italy by Pope Pius XI
- Canonized: 20 October 2024, Saint Peter's Square, Vatican City by Pope Francis
- Major shrine: Syriac Catholic Cathedral of Saint Paul, Damascus
- Feast: 10 July
- Attributes: Martyr's palm Eucharist; Rosary

The Martyrs of Damascus were eleven Catholic saints martyred while praying inside a Franciscan-run parish in Damascus by Druze during the 1860 civil conflict in Mount Lebanon and Damascus. They consist of The Massabki Brothers (Arabic: الأخوة المسابكيين) (Abdel Moati Massabki, Francis Massabki, and Raphael Massabki) and Manuel Ruiz Lopez and Companions (Manuel Ruiz López, Carmelo Bolta Bañuls, Nicanor Ascanio Soria, Nicolás María Alberca Torres, Pedro Nolasco Soler Méndez, Engelbert Kolland, Francisco Pinazo Peñalver, and Juan Jacob Fernández). The Massabki Brothers were three Maronite Catholics from Damascus, in present-day Syria and sons of Nehme Massabki. Emmanuel Ruiz and the seven other martyrs were Franciscans, seven from Spain and one from Austria.

Their martyrdom took place in the night between 9-10 July 1860 and they were beatified in 1926. All eleven were canonized on 20 October 2024.

== Biographies ==
=== Massabki Brothers ===
Francis Massabki was a silk merchant, married man, and father. Because of his business skills, he was the representative of the Maronite Patriarch in Syria and acted on behalf of the Franciscans. Abdel Moati Massabki was also married and was martyred in front of two of his children. Raphael Massabki, as he was unmarried, was known for the help he gave to the friars. All three were known for their devotion to prayer. Reportedly, it was Francis who refused to deny the faith to the Druze. Because of his good standing, those who martyred him offered to spare his life if he converted to Islam; Francis refused.

=== Spanish Franciscans ===
Manuel Ruiz López was the guardian of the friary and was martyred at the age of 56. When the Druze who murdered these martyrs entered the friary, Father Ruiz López ran to the tabernacle to consume the Eucharist. Carmelo Bolta Bañuls was the pastor and was martyred at the age of 57. Nicanor Ascanio Soria was ordained as a diocesan priest but rejoined the Franciscans two years before his martyrdom at age 46. His spirituality always was oriented toward martyrdom. Nicolás María Alberca Torres transferred from the Brothers of Jesus Nazarene Hospital in 1856 and was ordained two years before his martyrdom at age 30. Pedro Nolasco Soler Méndez was martyred at 33, having been ordained three years prior. Francisco Pinazo Peñalver was the sacristan of the parish. A lay brother for most of his life, he was martyred at 58.

Juan Jacob Fernández was the cook of the friary and entered the Franciscans with Francisco in 1831. He was martyred at 52. Fernandez was thrown from the tile roof of the church. Still alive, he fervently prayed to God that He would accept his sacrifice, until he was killed with a knife.

=== Austrian Franciscan ===
Engelbert Kolland was the parochial vicar and was martyred at the age of 33. He was known to be loved by the people.

== Beatification and canonization processes ==
Pope Pius XI proclaimed the beatification of the martyrs in 1926 and they were subsequently beatified on 10 October of that year.

On 18 December 2022, the Maronite patriarch Bechara Boutros al-Rahi announced that the Massabki Brothers would be recognized as saints without the need for a miracle because they were martyrs of the faith.

On July 1st 2024, Pope Francis presided at an Ordinary Consistory of Cardinals, which approved the canonization of 15 people, including The Martyrs of Damascus. In the Apostolic Palace for an Ordinary Public Consistory, Cardinal Marcello Semeraro presented 'Peroratio', a report on the lives and miracles of The Massabki Brothers, as well as Ruiz and his 7 companions. Each of these people were canonized by Pope Francis on October 20, 2024.
