= Christmas bombings (disambiguation) =

The term Christmas bombings usually refers to Operation Linebacker II.

It may also refer to:

- Raid on Cuxhaven by Germany in 1914
- Christmas Blitz, another name for the 1940–1942 Manchester Blitz by Nazi Germany
- Murders of Harry and Harriette Moore, a 1951 white supremacist terrorist bombing at a house in Mims, Florida
- Train 904 bombing, a 1984 terrorist attack in Italy; also called the Christmas massacre
- Kravica attack (1993) during the Bosnian War, on Orthodox Christmas
- Christmas Eve 2000 Indonesia bombings
- Strasbourg Cathedral bombing plot, a 2000 attempted terrorism incident
- Northwest Airlines Flight 253, a 2009 attempt to bomb an airplane over Detroit, Michigan
- Christmas 2011 Nigeria attacks
- 2013 Baghdad Christmas Day bombings
- 2020 Nashville bombing
- Dedebit Elementary School airstrike, a 2022 bombing in the Tigray Region, Ethiopia on Orthodox Christmas
