= Youhanna Battah =

Syrian Syriac Catholic archbishop (born 1956)

His Excellency Youhanna Jihad Mtanos Battah
- Syriac Catholic Archbishop of Damascus
- Church: Syriac Catholic Church
- Archdiocese: Damascus
- Installed: 12 July 2019
- Predecessor: Gregorios Elias Tabé

Orders
- Ordination: 19 May 1991 by Eustathe Joseph Mounayer
- Consecration: 20 May 2011 by Ignace Joseph III Younan

Personal details
- Born: Jihad Mtanos Battah; 26 June 1956 (age 70) Damascus, Syria
- Education: Holy Spirit University of Kaslik, Pontifical Oriental Institute

Youhanna Jihad Mtanos Battah (born 26 June 1956) is a Syrian Syriac Catholic hierarch, who has served as the Archbishop of Damascus since 2019. He previously served as a Curial Bishop of the Patriarchal Curia and the Titular Bishop of Phaena from 2011 to 2019.

== Early life and education ==
Youhanna Jihad Mtanos Battah was born on 26 June 1956 in Damascus, Syria. He pursued his initial ecclesiastical studies at the Holy Spirit University of Kaslik in Lebanon.

He later moved to Rome for advanced studies, where he earned a Doctorate in Canon Law from the Pontifical Oriental Institute in 1998. In addition to his native Arabic, he is fluent in Italian, French, and Syriac.

== Priesthood ==
Battah was ordained to the priesthood on 19 May 1991 for the Archeparchy of Damascus by Archbishop Eustathe Joseph Mounayer.

His early ministry included serving as the parish priest of Quatana. From 1992 to 2002, he served as the Rector of the Patriarchal Seminary of Charfet in Lebanon. He then returned to Rome, where he served as Rector of the Saint Ephrem College from 2002 to 2009. Upon his return to Syria, he was appointed Protosyncellus (Vicar General) of the Archeparchy of Damascus.

== Episcopate ==
=== Curial bishop ===
On 1 March 2011, Battah was elected as a Curial Bishop of the Syriac Patriarchal Curia and was subsequently appointed Titular Bishop of Phaena by Pope Benedict XVI. He received his episcopal consecration on 20 May 2011 from Patriarch Ignace Joseph III Younan.

=== Archbishop of Damascus ===
On 22 June 2019, the Synod of Bishops of the Syriac Catholic Church elected Battah as the Archbishop of Damascus, succeeding the retiring Gregorios Elias Tabé. Pope Francis granted his assent to the election on 12 July 2019.

In July 2025, Battah participated in the Annual Ordinary Synod of the Syriac Catholic Church held at the Vatican, which focused on the evangelical message and the needs of believers suffering from conflict in the Middle East. He has maintained close ecumenical ties with the Syriac Orthodox Church, including formal visits to Patriarch Ignatius Aphrem II to exchange greetings on the Christmas.

Battah has been a vocal advocate for "Middle East Synodality," emphasizing the importance of Christian unity and the preservation of the Christian presence in Syria despite the challenges posed by the Syrian civil war.
