= Diocese of Cephas =

Roman Catholic titular see

The Diocese of Cephas (in Latin Dioecesis Cephasena) is a suppressed seat in the Catholic Church. The official title is Titular Episcopal See of Cephas.

Cephas, located on the Tigris River in Tur Abdin, was an ancient episcopal seat of the Roman province of Mesopotamia in the diocese of the East. It was part of the Patriarchate of Antioch and was a suffragan of the Archdiocese of Amida, as attested by a 6th century Notitiae Episcopatuum, official documentation that furnishes the list and hierarchical rank of the metropolitan and suffragan bishoprics of a church.

Today Diocese of Cephas survives as only a titular bishop's seat. The seat is vacant since 1974.

== Bishops ==
There are two known historical bishops of this ancient episcopal seat.

The first, Benjamin, was bishop in the 4th century. He is mentioned in the biography of James the Egyptian, exiled in this region during the persecutions of the Emperor Julian (Latin: Flavius Claudius Iulianus Augustus) also known as Julian the Apostate.

The second bishop is Noé who was bishop in the 5th century. He took part in the Council of Chalcedon of 451 AD and signed the Greek bishops' letter to Emperor Leo I (Latin: Flavius Valerius Leo Augustus) also known as Leo the Thracian in 458 following the killing of the pro-Chalcedonian Patriarch of Alexandria Proterius on the hands of anti-Chalcedonian Coptic mobs

In the following centuries the Cephas diocese also had Jacobite bishops.

== Titular Bishopric ==
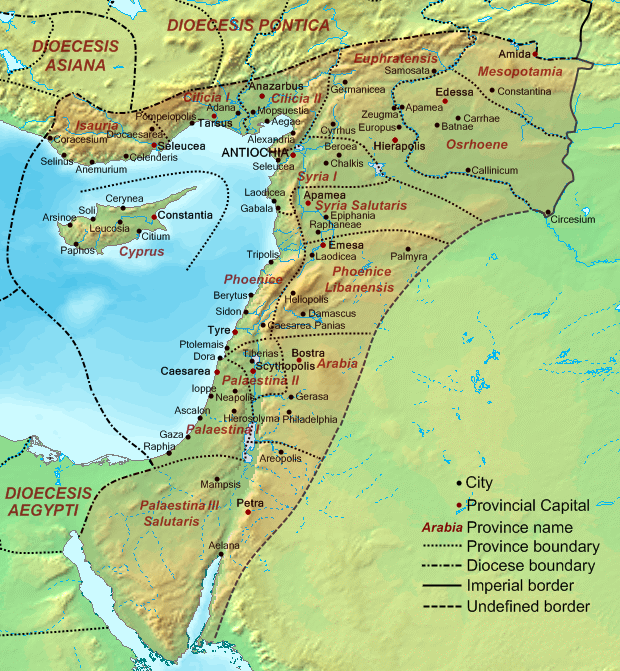
Cephas Diocese (titular)

Today Diocese of Cephas survives as a titular bishopric seat of the Catholic Church based in the Middle East. It was established in 1933 as a suffragan of the Archdiocese of Amida (1725-1970). It was given as a title to a number of eparchs and bishops of the Catholic Church.

The titular bishopric is presently suppressed and has remained vacant since May 5, 1974 with no further bishops assigned the title.

== List of Bishops ==
(Not comprehensive)

- Benjamin (4th century)
- Noé (mid-5th century)

=== Titular bishops (modern era) ===
- Archbishop Jules Georges Kandela (May 12, 1951 - March 7, 1952) - Confirmed Titular Bishop of Cephas of the Syrian Catholic Archeparchy of Mosul
- Bishop Miguel Antonio Medina y Medina (16 July 1952 - 23 March 1964) - Appointed bishop of Roman Catholic Archdiocese of Cali, Archdiocese of Medellín, Colombia
- Bishop Kuriakose Kunnacherry (9 December 1967 - 5 May 1974) - As eparch of Syro-Malabar Catholic Archeparchy of Kottayam
- Vacant since 1974
