= Monastery of Saint John of Dailam =

Syriac Orthodox Monastery near Qaraqosh, Iraq

Naqortaya Monastery
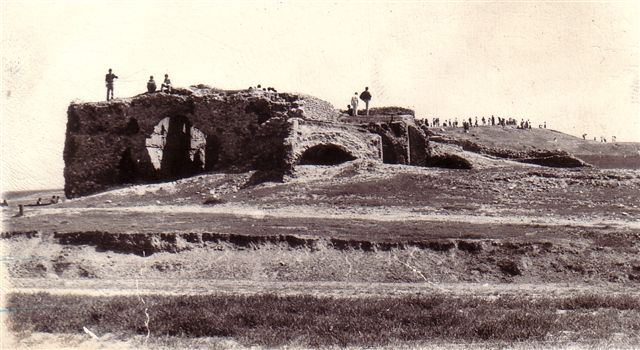
- Ruins of the monastery in the 1960s

- Location within Iraq

Monastery information
- Other name: ܕܝܪܐ ܢܩܘܪܬܝܐ
- Established: 7th century AD
- Disestablished: 19th century
- Dedication: Mar Yoḥannan Daylamáyá
- Diocese: Syriac Orthodox Diocese of Mosul

People
- Founder: Mar Yoḥannan Daylamáyá

Site
- Location: Bakhdida, Nineveh Province, Iraq
- Coordinates: 36°17′59″N 43°22′24″E
- Visible remains: the altar and a baptismal font
- Public access: yes

The Monastery of Saint John of Dailam, also known as Naqortaya and Muqurtaya (Syriac: ܕܝܪܐ ܢܩܘܪܬܝܐ, romanized: dayrā naqortāyā, lit. 'chiseled monastery'), is a Syriac Orthodox monastery that lies 3 km north of Qaraqosh in northern Iraq.

== History ==
The foundation of Naqortaya monastery is traditionally attributed to John of Dailam, who was active in the region in the seventh century and was responsible, according to a historical legend, for converting its people from the Church of the East to the Syriac Orthodox Church. However, the oldest attested mention of the monastery dates back to the late 9th century, and another Syriac manuscript states that it was consecrated in 1115.

Bar Hebraeus records that in 1261 the monastery was raided by the Kurds, who burned it down and killed its monks, and was abandoned until it was rebuilt in 1563. When the majority of the inhabitants of Bakhdida started converting to the Syriac Catholic Church in the 18th century the monastery remained under the control of the Syriac Orthodox Church and was left deserted. The monastery was excavated and rebuilt in 1998 and has an ancient carved altar and a large courtyard with a fountain and a statue. The monastery was from 2014-2-17 by the Islamic State..

== John of Dailam feast ==
The Naqurtaya monastery is visited by thousands of Syriac Orthodox pilgrims from the Nineveh Plains region during the feast of Yoḥannan Daylamáyá the last Friday of March.
