= Gregorios Elias Tabé =

Syrian prelate (1941–2023)

- Archbishop of Damas
- Church: Syriac Catholic Church
- Archdiocese: Archeparchy of Damas
- In office: 24 June 2001 – 22 June 2019
- Predecessor: Eustathe Joseph Mounayer
- Successor: Youhanna Battah
- Previous posts: Coadjutor Archbishop of Damas (1999-2001); Curial Bishop of Antioch (1997-1999); Titular Bishop of Mardin (1996-1999); Auxiliary Bishop of Damas (1995-1997); Titular Bishop of Batnae dei Siri (1995-1996)

Orders
- Ordination: 4 May 1969
- Consecration: 7 January 1996 by Ignatius Antony II Hayyek

Personal details
- Born: 18 March 1941 Mardin, First Inspectorate-General, Turkey
- Died: 16 April 2023 (aged 82) Qamishli, Al-Hasakah Governorate, Syria

Gregorios Elias Tabé (18 March 1941 – 16 April 2023) was a Syrian Syriac Catholic prelate. He was first ordained to the priesthood on 4 May 1969.

He was auxiliary bishop from 1996 to 1997, coadjutor archbishop from 1997 to 1999, and archbishop of Damascus from 2001, until his retirement due to old age in 2019.
