= 2008 attacks on Christians in Mosul =

Series of targeted attacks

2008 attacks on Christians
- Location: Mosul, Iraq
- Date: October 2008 – January 2009
- Target: Christians
- Attack type: Killings, intimidation
- Deaths: >40

2008 attacks on Christians in Mosul was a series of attacks which targeted Iraqi Christians in Mosul, Iraq. The Christians of Mosul, who were already targeted during the Iraq War, left the city en masse heading to Assyrian villages in Nineveh Plains and Iraqi Kurdistan. Both Sunni extremists, and Kurdish Peshmerga were blamed for the attacks.

== Background ==
Christians and religious minorities in general were badly affected by the rise of Islamic fundamentalism after the invasion of Iraq. A number of Christians were killed in Baghdad and Mosul, and on 1 August 2004 a series of explosions targeted Churches in Baghdad, Mosul and Kirkuk leaving 15 dead and 71 injured.

On 13 March 2008, the body of the Chaldean Archbishop of the city, Paulos Faraj Rahho, was found buried in a shallow grave near Mosul. Rahho was the highest ranking Christian cleric to be killed in Iraq.

== Attacks ==
=== October attacks ===
The first series of attacks started in October when Christians families were given choice of death or converting to Islam. By the end of the month around 14 Christians were killed and more than 13,000 were forced to flee to Nineveh Plains. The Iraqi government gave $900,000 to help the refugees.

=== November attacks ===
Seven bodies belonging to Christians were found in the streets of Mosul on early November. A house belonging to Syriac Catholic sisters was attacked and two nuns were killed and a third severely injured. Around 500 families were forced to flee the city as a result, where they found refuge in Churches and with relatives in nearby villages.

== Aftermath ==
=== 2009 attacks ===
In January 2009 15 Christians were killed in Mosul and more Christians fled to the Nineveh Plains and Christian villages in Iraqi Kurdistan seeking safety.

== Accusation of Kurdish involvement ==
The Christians, however, blamed the attack on the Peshmerga, who were forcing Christians out of their homes by threatening them with death or by killing them. Eyewitnesses claimed that some of the assailants, because of their accent, were easily identified as Kurds attempting to pose as Arabs. Rumour circulated that Kurds were posing as Arabs and had secretly targeted the Christians in order to draw them towards the Kurdish side during an anticipated referendum concerning the Disputed territories of northern Iraq, of which the Christians form a substantial minority.

Some Iraqi and American military officials denied the allegations of Kurdish responsibility. Younadem Kana, a member of Iraq’s parliament and head of the Assyrian Democratic Movement, said media reports, including the London-based Asharq Al-Awsat newspaper, "published lies under my name" accusing the Kurds of allowing violence to displace more Mosul Christians. "My statements were changed and fabrications were published under my name," said Kana, who also heads the Assyrian Democratic Movement. He said the accusation against Kurds, first publicized at a press conference 25 October by Sunni parliamentarian Osama al-Nujaifi, were "baseless."

Accusations against Kurdish groups were also made by al-Hadba Arab political bloc of Mosul, which is led by Osama Al Naijafi and his brother, Atheel, the current governor of Nineveh.

== See also ==
- Paulos Faraj Rahho
- 2013 Iraq Christmas Day bombings
- 2010 Baghdad church attack
- 2004 Iraq churches attacks
