= Catholic Church in Iraq =

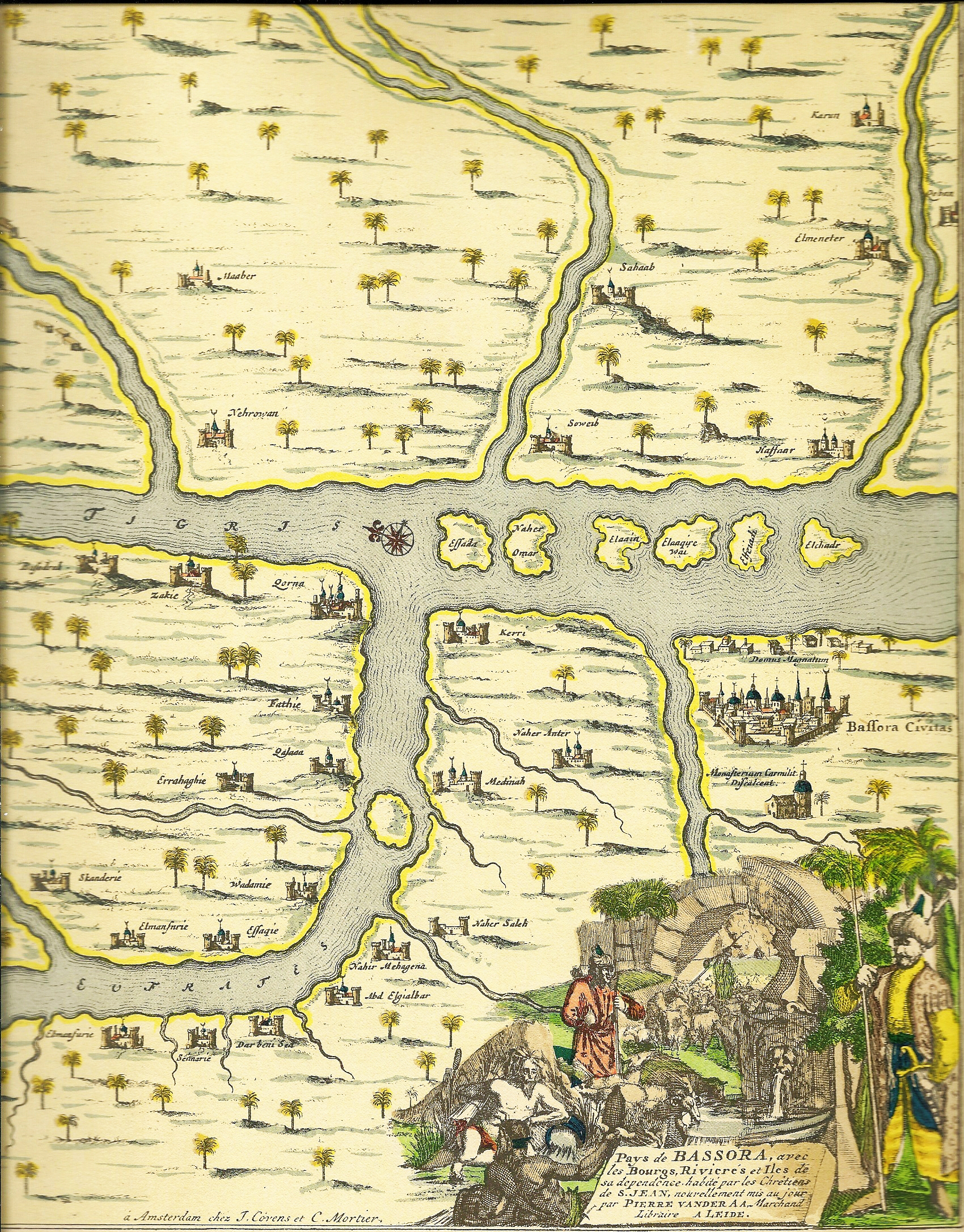
The modern history of Catholicism in Iraq began in the 17th century when Emir Afrasiyab of Basra allowed the Portuguese to build a church outside of the city

Catholics in Iraq follow several different rites, but in 2022, most (82%) are members of the Chaldean Catholic Church; about 17% belong to the Syriac Catholic Church, and the remainder are primarily Armenian, Greek and Latin-rite Catholics.

There has not been a census in Iraq since 2010, and there is no exact number of Christians in the country. Local leaders suggest that there were 150,000 Christians in 2022; however, other estimates suggested that there were 295,000 Catholics. All figures suggest that Catholics make up less than 1% of the country's population.

In 2020, there were 170 priests and 364 nuns serving across 143 parishes. In 2023, there are 15 currently active dioceses in Iraq and a Patriarchal See.

In 2019, the Archbishop of Erbil, in Kurdistan, warned that Catholicism and Christianity in general was in danger of becoming 'extinct' in Iraq due to persistent persecution from militant Islamic groups such as Daesh.

Pope Francis visited Iraq in March 2021.

In July 2023, Louis Sako, the Chaldean Catholic Patriarchate of Baghdad, announced that he would leave Baghdad for Iraqi Kurdistan after an ongoing dispute with the Iraqi government. But he returned back in 2024 after he reconciled with the Iraqi government.

== Dioceses and Eparchies ==
- Armenian Catholic Archeparchy of Baghdad
- Chaldean Catholic Archeparchy of Basra
- Chaldean Catholic Archeparchy of Erbil
- Chaldean Catholic Archeparchy of Kirkuk-Sulaimaniya
- Chaldean Catholic Archeparchy of Mosul
- Chaldean Catholic Diocese of Alquoch
- Chaldean Catholic Diocese of Aqrā
- Chaldean Catholic Eparchy of Amadiyah and Zaku
- Chaldean Catholic Archeparchy of Baghdad
- Chaldean Catholic Patriarchal See of Babylon
- Melkite Greek Catholic Patriarchal Exarchate of Iraq
- Latin Catholic Archdiocese of Baghdad
- Syriac Catholic Archeparchy of Baghdad
- Syriac Catholic Archeparchy of Mosul
- Syriac Catholic Patriarchal Exarchate of Basra and the Gulf

== See also ==
- Religion in Iraq
- Christianity in Iraq
- Freedom of religion in Iraq
- Latin Catholic Archdiocese of Baghdad
- Catholic Church by country
