= Eustathe Joseph Mounayer =

Syriac Catholic archbishop (1925–2007)

Most Reverend Eustathe Joseph Mounayer
- Archbishop of Damascus
- Church: Syriac Catholic Church
- Province: Damascus
- Appointed: 4 September 1978
- Term ended: 15 May 2001
- Predecessor: Clément Georges Schelhoth
- Successor: Gregorios Elias Tabé
- Other posts: Titular Bishop of Hierapolis in Syria dei Siri (1971-1978); Auxiliary Bishop of Antioch (1971-1978); Curial Archbishop of Antioch (2001-2006)

Orders
- Ordination: 23 April 1949
- Consecration: 15 August 1971 by Ignatius Antony II Hayyek

Personal details
- Born: 6 June 1925 Damascus, Mandate for Syria and the Lebanon
- Died: 16 February 2007 (aged 81)

Eustathe Joseph Mounayer (6 June 1925 – 16 February 2007) was a Syrian Syriac Catholic hierarch, who served as the Archbishop of the Syriac Catholic Archeparchy of Damascus from 1978 until 2001. A key figure in Middle Eastern ecumenism and synodical governance, he also served as a Curial Bishop and a member of the Permanent Synod of the Syriac Catholic Church.

== Early life and priesthood ==
Mounayer was born on 6 June 1925 in Damascus, Syria. He make a theological formation and was ordained a priest for the Archeparchy of Damascus on 23 April 1949 at the age of 23.

== Episcopal career ==
On 10 May 1971, Mounayer was appointed as both an Auxiliary Bishop of the Syriac Catholic Patriarchate of Antioch in Lebanon and the Titular Bishop of Hierapolis in Syria dei Siri. He received his episcopal consecration on 15 August 1971 from Patriarch Ignatius Antony II Hayyek, with Archbishops Grégoire Ephrem Jarjour and Flavien Zacharie Melki serving as co-consecrators.

On 4 September 1978, he was elected Archbishop of the Syriac Catholic Archeparchy of Damascus, succeeding Clément Georges Schelhoth.

=== Synodical and Ecumenical Work ===
Mounayer was deeply involved in the collective governance of the Eastern Catholic Churches. In 1998, during the Special Assembly for Lebanon of the Synod of Bishops, he was a vocal participant, highlighting the pastoral needs of the Syriac community and the necessity of Christian-Muslim coexistence.

His scholarship contributed significantly to the "Pro Oriente" ecumenical consultations. His work helped facilitate the understanding of the "Common Declaration" between the Catholic Church and the Syriac Orthodox Church, addressing long-standing Christological disputes.

== Later years and death ==
Mounayer reached the mandatory retirement age and stepped down from the See of Damascus on 15 May 2001. Following his retirement, he was appointed a Curial Bishop of the Patriarchate of Antioch, a role he held until his final resignation in 2006.

He died on 16 February 2007 at the age of 81. His death was officially recorded in the Vatican's Acta Apostolicae Sedis.
