= 2010 Baghdad church siege =

Siege and massacre at a Syriac Church in Baghdad, Iraq

Coordinates: 33°18′25″N 44°25′33″E

Baghdad church siege
- Part of Iraqi insurgency (2003–2011)
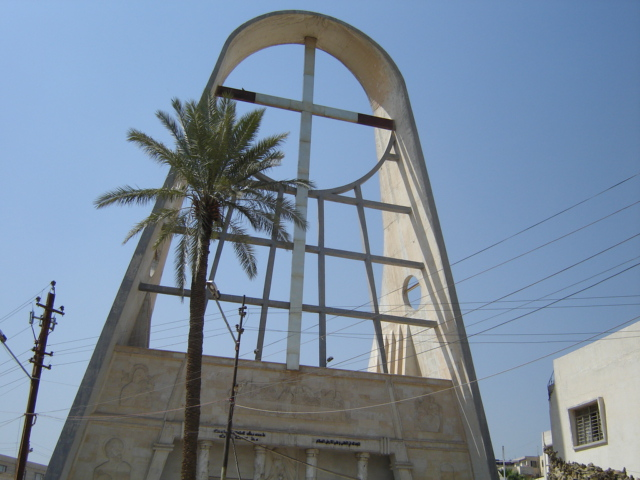
- The cross of the Sayedat al-najat ("Our Lady of Salvation") Cathedral in Baghdad.
- Location: Karrada, Baghdad, Iraq
- Date: 31 October 2010; 17:00 – ~21:30 (UTC+3)
- Target: Sayidat al-Nejat Cathedral
- Attack type: Siege; hostage-taking, suicide attacks
- Weapons: Machine guns, car bomb, explosive belts, grenades
- Deaths: Two priests; 39–44 worshippers; 7–12 police/security; 5 bystanders; all (perhaps six) jihadi attackers
- Injuries: 78
- Perpetrator: Islamic State of Iraq
- Motive: Anti-Christian sentiment

On 31 October 2010, six suicide bombers of the Islamic State of Iraq (ISI) militant group stormed into the Sayidat al-Nejat Cathedral (a Syriac Catholic church in Baghdad) during Sunday evening Mass, taking the congregants hostage. The ISI was a militant group which aimed to overthrow the Iraqi federal government and establish an Islamic state in Iraq.

Hours later, Iraqi commandos stormed the church. In the ensuing confrontation, fifty-eight worshippers, priests, policemen, and bystanders were killed and seventy-eight were wounded or maimed. World leaders and some Iraqi Sunni and Shi'ite imams condemned the massacre.

In late November 2010, Huthaifa al-Batawi, who was accused of masterminding the assault, was arrested along with eleven others in connection with the attack. During a failed attempt to escape in May 2011, Batawi and ten other senior ISI militants were killed by an Iraqi SWAT team. On 2 August 2011, three other men were sentenced to death and a fourth to 20 years in prison in connection with the massacre. In 2012, an appeals court confirmed the sentences.

== Background ==
=== Iraq ===
After 19 March 2003 invasion of Iraq by a U.S.-led coalition aiming to destroy Iraq's Ba'athist government of President Saddam Hussein, the occupying forces on 21 April 2003 installed the Coalition Provisional Authority (CPA) for temporary governance. On 28 June 2004 the CPA installed the Iraqi Interim Government, consisting of Iraqis and headed by Prime Minister Ayad Allawi, a Shia Muslim.

After the Iraqi parliamentary elections of December 2005, which saw a high turnout of 80%, a broad coalition government was formed consisting of the four largest parties: the Shi'ite National Iraqi Alliance (or United Iraqi Alliance), the Kurdish Democratic Patriotic Alliance of Kurdistan (DPAK), the Sunni Iraqi Accord Front (or Tawafuq), and the diverse Iraqi National List. This government was headed by Prime Minister Nouri al-Maliki, a Shia Muslim sworn in on 20 May 2006.

On 7 March 2010, new parliamentary elections had taken place, but a new government had not yet been formed.

=== 'Islamic State of Iraq' ===
In 1999, Abu Musab al-Zarqawi started his group Jama'at al-Tawhid wal-Jihad ("Organization of Monotheism and Jihad") with the purpose of toppling so-called "apostate" Arab regimes like the Jordanian monarchy.

Half a year after the March 2003 invasion of Iraq, Zarqawi had turned his main attention to Iraq, and forged himself a reputation for beheadings and a suicide bombing campaign against Shiite religious targets and Sunni civilians. He had also attacked UN representatives and the Jordanian embassy in Baghdad (August 2003) and killed or beheaded nine foreign hostages (May–October 2004).

In October 2004, Zarqawi pledged bay'ah (allegiance) to Osama bin Laden of Al-Qaeda, and renamed his group Tanzim Qaidat al-Jihad fi Bilad al-Rafidayn, more popularly known as al-Qaeda in Iraq (AQI), or al-Qaeda in the Land of Two Rivers, or al-Qaeda in Mesopotamia. Killings continued as before.

In January 2006, AQI became part of a larger umbrella organization Mujahideen Shura Council (MSC). On 13 October 2006, MSC declared its reranding and the establishment of the Islamic State of Iraq organization.

=== Christians in Iraq ===
Christians are believed to have lived in Iraq since the first century AD. In 2003, Iraq counted one million Christians according to The New York Times on a population of 26 million; the estimate of Syriac Catholic officials was then 2½ million Christians.

Between 2003 and 2007, 40% of the refugees fleeing Iraq were Christian. By November 2010, half of the Christians of 2003 had left Iraq and 600,000 still remained according to BBC (although Chaldean Cardinal Emmanuel III Delly estimated that 1½ million Christians remained).

On 1 August 2004, six churches in Baghdad and Mosul were attacked simultaneously with bombs killing 12 people and wounding many others. The Sayidat al-Nejat (or "Our Lady of Salvation") Syriac Catholic church in Karrada, a middle-class district in Baghdad with many Christian churches, was one of the churches attacked with a car bomb, killing two people and wounding 90. The 2004 attacks were claimed by a previously unknown group, but the claim could not be verified.

In August 2006, 13 Assyrian Christian women in Baghdad were kidnapped and murdered. Between December 2004 and December 2006, another 27 churches in Iraq were attacked or bombed. Christians were targets of violence and often kidnapped to force relatives to pay ransom. The United States Commission on International Religious Freedom said in 2007 that Christians were among the most vulnerable groups in Iraq.

=== American pastor threatens to burn the Quran ===
In the beginning of September 2010, the Reverend Terry Jones in Gainesville, Florida, U.S., announced he would burn a Quran on 11 September 2010. A team from The New York Times went to the Sayidat al-Nejat Syrian Catholic church in Baghdad and noticed concrete bollards, razor wire, and oil drums filled with cement barricading the entrance—apparently the church was preparing for the worst.

The Times journalists spoke there with Father Thaer Abdal, who said he was worried that the threatened Quran-burning would cause Christians in Iraq to be targeted again after a period of relative calm, and said:

I would like to send a message to the pastor who is in America; he lives in a society that protects humans and religious beliefs. Why would he want to harm Christians in Iraq? This is dangerous. He should realize that we live in cultures of various denominations, especially in Iraq.

== Chronology ==
=== Raid on Stock Exchange ===
On Sunday 31 October 2010 at 5pm, at dusk, four men 'in military uniforms' (as a nearby resident described later) got out of a black SUV in front of the Iraq Stock Exchange in Baghdad. Baghdad's security spokesman Al-Moussawi later said that the men had been disguised as guards working for a private security firm and had carried fake IDs, which may have enabled them to approach despite checkpoints in the vicinity. They were wearing suicide vests and fought off security forces at the stock exchange, killing two guards who tried to stop them from raiding the building. In this attack four passersby were also killed.

=== Attack on church ===
Then three other men arrived in an ordinary car, and all seven men jumped over the wall into the Sayidat al-Nejat Cathedral, a Syriac Catholic Church across the road from the Stock Exchange around 6pm during Sunday Mass, armed with machine guns, explosive belts, and grenades. They detonated their ordinary car, clashed with guards and killed some, and burst through the church's huge wooden doors which they closed. While they came in, some 19 people managed to leave the church. Sources gave the number of attackers as six or between 6 and 15.

Worshippers, about 100, were herded to the centre of the church by the gunmen, but a priest led another 60 to the sacristy at the back of the church. The gunmen turned the lights off and began shooting around the church and at the congregation, with Rev. Thaer Abdal being killed at the altar. The gunmen "were just youths", said a 26-year-old woman. The gunmen said they were avenging "the burning of the Qur'an and the jailing of Muslim women in Egypt". Meanwhile, they phoned TV station Al-Baghdadia, claimed the attack for Islamic State of Iraq (ISI), and requested Al-Baghdadia to broadcast that they wanted to negotiate.

=== Iraqi troops storm the church ===
Around 8.30 pm Iraqi security forces and 3rd Platoon, Alpha battery, TF 1-41, 3ID, U.S. Army from Fort Stewart, Georgia stormed the church since, as Iraqi Defence Minister al-Obeidi explained, gunmen threatened to kill all hostages. Dozens of security forces blew open the church doors and stormed inside. As the Iraqi forces rushed in, the gunmen opened fire on the hostages in the church, causing mass slaughter. In the basement a gunman killed 30 hostages, either with two grenades or with an explosive vest he was wearing. Reports give differing numbers for those killed: as 58 (and 50 or 78 wounded); or as 44 worshippers, two priests, and seven security force personnel killed; or as 39 worshippers, two priests, 12 policemen, and five bystanders outside the church. All six attackers were killed. An Iraqi police officer gave a vivid account of the human carnage.

=== ISI declaring war and hate on Christianity ===
Afterwards, Islamic State of Iraq (ISI) posted an audio message on a jihadist website again claiming responsibility for the attack, and calling for the release of two Egyptian female Muslims who they alleged were being held against their will in Coptic Christian monasteries in Egypt (see also Kamilia Shehata: an Egyptian Christian woman, allegedly converted to Islam, allegedly returned by police to her family).

In probably that same Internet statement, ISI also called the church "the dirty den of idolatry", said that a deadline now expired for Egypt's Coptic church to free those two women purportedly held captive in monasteries, that the fuse of a campaign against Iraqi Christians had been lit, and therefore now declared "all Christian centers, organizations and institutions, leaders and followers in Iraq to be legitimate targets for the mujahideen wherever they can reach them". ISI, referring to the alleged Muslim women held captive in monasteries, also wrote: "Let these idolaters, and at their forefront the hallucinating tyrant of the Vatican, know that the killing sword will not be lifted from the necks of their followers until they declare their innocence from what the dog of the Egyptian Church is doing ... [and] pressure this belligerent church to release the captive women from the prisons of their monasteries". A video showing five suicide bombers wearing their vests and reading their last statements was later released by the Islamic State of Iraq. Four of the attackers were from different Arab countries and one was Iraqi.

== Hypotheses ==
U.S. Army spokesman Bloom assumed the whole incident was a "robbery gone wrong. We've seen them resort to robbery to get financed. It has been very challenging for them to get outside financing, so they are resorting to small, petty crimes to try to finance themselves".

The opposite view was expressed by the Tehran Times, which suggested that the initial assault on the Stock Exchange building may have been only an attempt to divert attention from their real target: the church. The BBC also assumed that the church had been the real target.

== Investigation, measures, trial ==
On 31 October 2010, an unspecified number of suspects were arrested. As standard procedure after high-profile attacks, the police commander in charge of the district was also detained for questioning.

On 1 November 2010, the building of TV station Al-Baghdadia that had been contacted by the militants (supra, ISI claim) was taken over by government troops. The station was taken off air, the director and an employee arrested on vague charges, but released after 24 hours.

Late November 2010, Huthaifa al-Batawi, known as ISI's "Emir of Baghdad", was arrested along with 11 others in connection with 31 October assault on Our Lady of Salvation church.

Batawi was accused of master-minding the assault and was locked up in a counter-terrorism jail complex in Baghdad's Karrada district. During a failed attempt to escape in May 2011, Batawi and 10 other senior ISI militants were killed by an Iraqi SWAT team.

Three other men were sentenced to death and a fourth to 20 years in prison, on 2 August 2011, in connection with that 31 October 2010 massacre. In 2012 an appeals court confirmed the sentences.

== International reactions ==
- Iraq – Prime Minister Nouri al-Maliki said the attack was an "attempt to reignite sectarian strife in Iraq and to drive more Christians out of the country". The Kurdistan Regional Government condemned the attack in a statement saying: "We strongly condemn this terrorist attack on our Christian brethren in Baghdad. We send our condolences to the families of the victims and wish a speedy recovery for the wounded".
  - Iraq's top Catholic prelate, Cardinal Emmanuel III Delly, encouraged an already dwindled Christian population of 1.5 million not to leave, while he also condemned the attack as: "We have never seen anything like it, militants attacking God's house with worshipers". Monsignor Eyos Qasho said, "If the sons of this country cannot live in peace then the situation is clearly unacceptable. Had we been provided with adequate security, this would not have happened." Chaldean Bishop Shlimon Warduni said: "This is tragic for Christians and for all of Iraq. If we had a government and laws and people all over the world to help us it would be much better." The church congregation held funerals for the dead two days later, while at the same time a string of bombings in Baghdad killed over 100 in mostly Shia areas.
  - Father Douglas Yousef al-Bazy, who worked with the priests killed in the attack said that he was also stopped at a roadblock as he sought to get to the church after hearing explosions. He said: "The people who did this want to kill the church ... but we will stay in this country because still there are Christian people here and we still have a mission here."
  - Najaf-based Grand Shiite Cleric Ayatollah Ali al-Sistani advised Iraqi security forces to take more responsibility for the protection of Iraqi citizens. During Friday prayers on the same week, all mosques in Kirkuk condemned the "barbaric attack," while the mayor and the sheikh of the Arab, Kurd, and Turkmen tribes also expressed condolences and solidarity with the Chaldean archbishop. Sunni and Shia imams also condemned the attack in solidarity with Archbishop Louis Sako. They called for the preservation of "the Iraqi mosaic" of various ethnic groups and religions. One imam also called for Muslims to protect Christians "and launched an appeal for all the Iraqis to not succumb to fear and not to leave their country."
- France – A day after the attack France said it would accept 150 Iraqis, with priority given to the wounded in the attack. A diplomat said the wounded would be evacuated on a hospital plane and taken to various hospitals in France.
  - Ultimately, France opened a fast-tracked humanitarian visa pipeline specifically targeting Iraqi Christians. Leaders like Louis Raphaël Sako (who later became the Chaldean Patriarch) begged their congregations to stay in fear of losing their apostolic culture, language, and history. In contrast, Western human rights observers and European politicians argued that since the Iraqi government could not protect them, and Western military intervention was winding down, advising them to stay was irresponsible.
- Egypt – The Egyptian Muslim Brotherhood then called for churches to be protected.
- Iran – Iranian Foreign Ministry Spokesman Ramin Mehmanparast offered condolences to the Iraqi people and government and said: "The incident was a measure for return of terrorism and violence to Iraq and affecting the political process of government formation". A few days later a meeting of the Majlis also generally criticised "some regional and foreign" players for destabilising Iraq.
- Holy See – Pope Benedict XVI condemned the "senseless violence, made more ferocious because it was directed against unarmed people gathered in the house of God, which is a house of love and reconciliation", and he called for renewed international efforts at brokering peace in the region. He also sent a telegram of condolence to Archbishop Athanase Matti Shaba Matoka of the Syro-Catholics: "Deeply shocked by the violent death of so many faithful and of Fathers Tha'ir Saad and Boutros Wasim, I desire, on this occasion of the Sacred Rite of the funerals, to be spiritually present. ...For many years, this beloved country has suffered unspeakable hardship and Christians have also become an object of heinous attacks with total lack of respect for life, the inviolable gift of God, desiring to undermine trust and civil coexistence. I renew my Appeal so that the sacrifice of these brothers and sisters of ours may be a seed of peace and true rebirth, and because many have reconciliation at heart, brotherly and supportive coexistence".
- Russia – Ministry of Foreign Affairs said: "Moscow presents profound condolences over the death of innocent civilians and Iraqi policemen. We strongly condemn the crime of terrorists and the attacks on freedom and the life of believers of any religion."
- United Kingdom – Archbishop Athanasios Dawood, the leader of the Syriac Orthodox church in the United Kingdom, said all Christians should leave Iraq in the wake of the attack, "I say clearly and now – the Christian people should leave their beloved land of our ancestors and escape the premeditated ethnic cleansing. This is better than having them killed one by one".
- United States – White House press secretary Robert Gibbs said: "The United States strongly condemns this senseless act of hostage taking and violence by terrorists linked to al Qaeda in Iraq that occurred Sunday in Baghdad killing so many innocent Iraqis". U.S. Representatives Anna G. Eshoo and Frank Wolf, co-chairs of the Religious Minorities in the Middle East Caucus, and seven other representatives, sent a letter to Secretary of State Hillary Clinton, calling for the Obama administration to develop a comprehensive policy for the protection of indigenous religious communities in Iraq. They also offered condolences to the victims and their families.
  - Martin Manna, the executive director of the Michigan-based Chaldean American Chamber of Commerce, responded to the attack saying: "Our community's just so frustrated more than anything else. Security is just terrible. The Iraqi government ... can't protect their people".
- Worldwide, young Assyrian Christians organized protest rallies for Monday 8 November 2010, dubbed "The Black March", in solidarity with the victims in 31 October attack.

== Canonization process ==
On October 31, 2019, the Archdiocese of Baghdad began the canonization process for 48 Catholics who died during the attack. On March 5, 2021, Pope Francis visited the church where the attack occurred.

== See also ==
- 2004 church bombings in Baghdad and Mosul
- 2008 attacks on Christians in Mosul
- 2013 Baghdad Christmas Day bombings
