= 2004 church bombings in Baghdad and Mosul =

2004 car bomb attacks in Iraq

Church bombings in Baghdad and Mosul
- Part of Iraqi insurgency (2003–2006)
- Location: Baghdad and Mosul, Iraq
- Date: 1 August 2004; ~18:30 – ~19:00 (UTC+4)
- Target: Baghdad: Church Sayidat al-Najat (Our Lady of Salvation) - Karrada, Baghdad; Church Sayidat al-Zohour (Our Lady of the Flowers) - Karrada, Baghdad; (Armenian Catholic Church) Sts. Peter & Paul, Dora, Baghdad; St. Elia, Baghdad; St. Mary's Assyrian Church of the East Baghdad; Mosul: St. Paul Church - Center of Mosul
- Attack type: Car bombings
- Deaths: at least 12
- Injuries: at least 71
- Perpetrator: Jama'at al-Tawhid wal-Jihad
- Motive: Anti-Christian sentiment

On August 1, 2004, a series of car bomb attacks took place during the Sunday evening Mass in churches of two Iraqi cities, Baghdad and Mosul. The six attacks killed at least 12 people and wounded at least 71. No one claimed responsibility for the attacks, but Iraq's national security adviser, Mowaffaq al-Rubaie, blamed the attacks on Abu Musab al-Zarqawi. The bombings marked the first major attack against the Christian community since the 2003 invasion of Iraq.

== Attacks ==
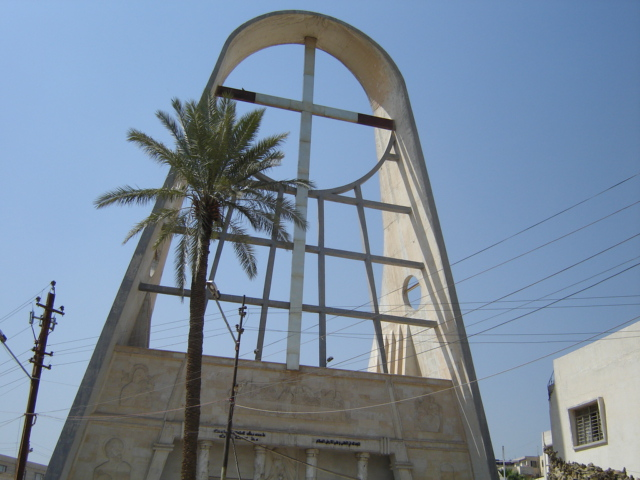
Sayedat al-najat Church

The attacks happened within a few minutes of each another. Rigged cars were parked outside churches and detonated when parishioners were leaving services. Only one of the bombings was believed to have been a suicide attack. The witnesses reported that "body parts were scattered across the area". Of the six bombs, one did not explode and the police was able to remove it safely.

In Mosul, hospitals reported two people were killed and 15 others were injured.

One of the bombed churches the Our Lady of Salvation Syriac Catholic cathedral was the same church that was attacked with hostages taken and killed on October 31, 2010.

== Responsibility ==
Al-Qaeda in Iraq claimed responsibility for the attacks on an Islamic website. Iraq's national security adviser, Mowaffaq al-Rubaie, blamed the attacks on Abu Musab al-Zarqawi.

== Reaction ==
A Vatican spokesman, Rev. Ciro Benedettini, called the attacks "terrible and worrisome". The Pope "firmly deplored the unjust aggressions against those whose only aim is to collaborate for peace and reconciliation in the country". The Russian Orthodox Church issued a statement saying "the attacks were an attempt to spark a religious conflict."

Muslims around the country condemned the attacks. In a statement to Al-Jazeera television, a spokesman for Muqtada al-Sadr said: "This is a cowardly act and targets all Iraqis". Ali al-Sistani issued a statement in which he wrote: "We stress the need to respect the rights of Christians in Iraq and those of other religious faiths and their right to live in their home, Iraq, peacefully."

Although only comprising about three percent of the population, Iraqi Christians make up 20% of Iraqis leaving the country as refugees. After 2004 churches bombing, which was the worst act of violence against Christian minority by that time, a member of Christian community, Layla Isitfan, in her interview with Time correspondents said: "If I can't go to church because I'm scared, if I can't dress how I want, if I can't drink because it's against Islam, what kind of freedom is that?"

== See also ==
- 2008 attacks on Christians in Mosul
- 2010 Baghdad church attack
- 2013 Iraq Christmas Day bombings
