= Syriac Catholic Archeparchy of Damascus =

Eastern Catholic archeparchy in Syria

Coordinates: 33.5094°N 36.3166°E

Archeparchy of Damascus Archidioecesis Damascena Syrorum
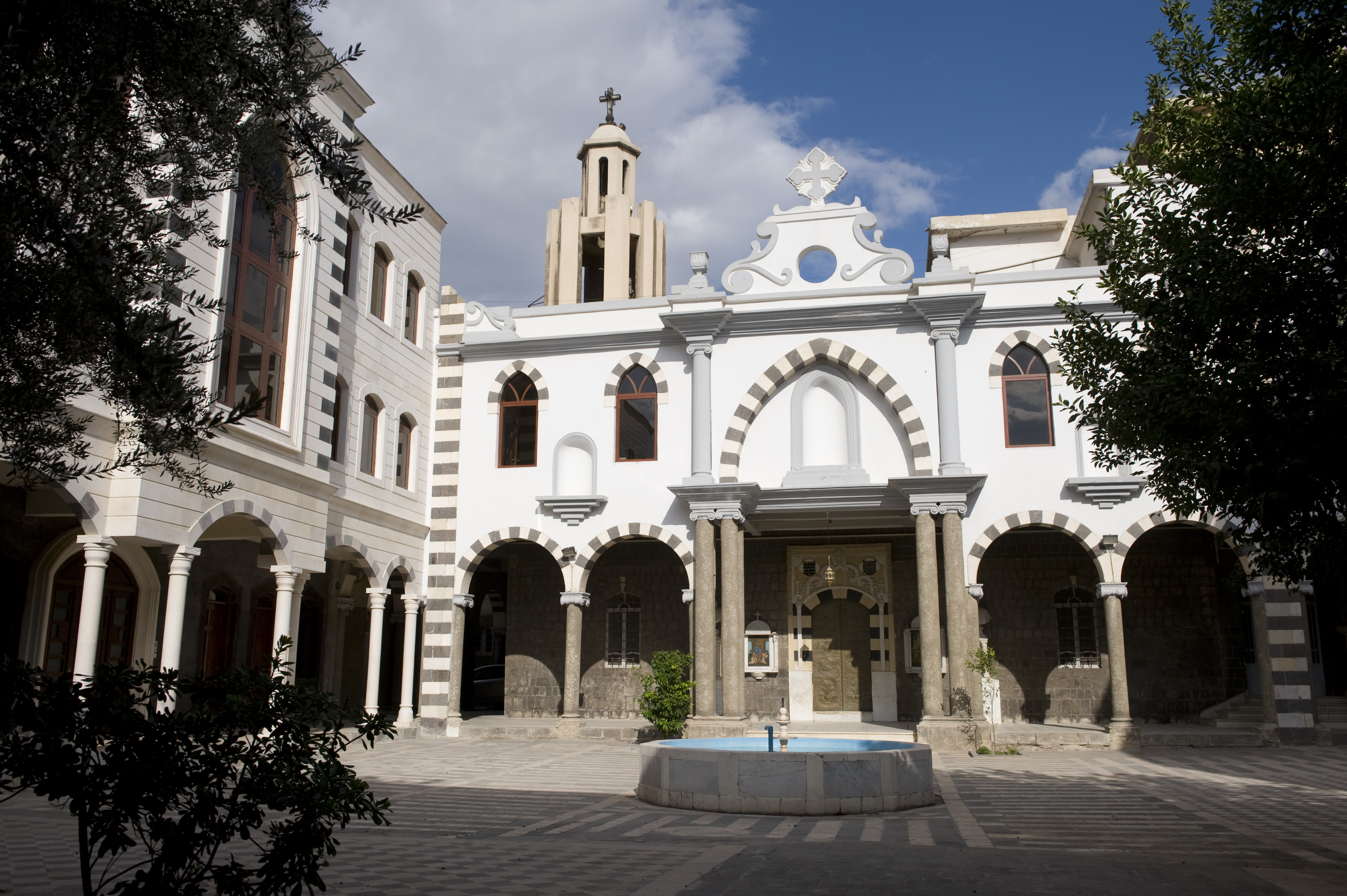
- Cathedral of Saint Paul, Damascus

Location
- Country: Syria

Statistics
- Population: (as of 2013); 14,000
- Parishes: 5

Information
- Denomination: Catholic Church
- Sui iuris church: Syriac Catholic Church
- Rite: West Syriac Rite
- Established: 1633
- Cathedral: Syriac Catholic Cathedral of Saint Paul
- Secular priests: 7

Current leadership
- Pope: Leo XIV
- Patriarch: Ignatius Joseph III Younan
- Archeparch: Youhanna Battah

Website
- dasycach.com

The Syriac Catholic Archeparchy of Damascus is a Syriac Catholic Church ecclesiastical territory or eparchy of the Catholic Church in Syria. While a metropolitan see, the Archeparchy of Damascus is without suffragans and is exempt directly to the Syriac Catholic Patriarchate of Antioch. It has its cathedral in the archepiscopal see and Syrian national capital Damascus.

== History ==
It was established in 1633 in its present status, on territory previously without a Syriac Catholic ordinary or ecclesiastical territory.

Pope John Paul II visited the archeparchy in May 2001.

== Ordinaries ==
Metropolitan Archeparchs of Damascus

(incomplete : first centuries unavailable)

- Clément Michel Bakhache (1900.09.24 – 1922.08.03), emeritate as Titular Archbishop of Chalcedon of the Syriacs (1922.08.03 – death 1958.07.04)
- Grégoire Pierre Habra (1924.03.24 – death 1933.03.21), previously Archeparch (Archbishop) of Mossul of the Syriacs (Iraq) (1901.08.16 – 1924.03.24)
- Iwannis Georges Stété (1933.10.16 – 1968.08.20), emeritate as Titular Archbishop of Bostra (1968.08.20 – 1975.02.27)
- Clément Abdulla Eliane Rahal (1968.08.20 – death 1971.05.30)
- Clément Georges Schelhoth (1972.07.07 – 1978.09.04), later Auxiliary Eparch of the patriarchate Antioch of the Syriacs (Lebanon) (1978.09.04 – 1979), emeritate as Titular Archbishop of Hierapolis in Syria of the Syriacs (1978.09.04 – 1991.10.04)
- Eustathe Joseph Mounayer (1978.09.04 – 2001.05.15), previously Titular Bishop of Hierapolis in Syria of the Syriacs (1971.05.10 – 1978.09.04) & Auxiliary Bishop of the patriarchate Antioch of the Syriacs (Lebanon) (1971.05.10 – 1978.09.04), later Bishop of Curia of the Syriacs (2001.05.15 – retired 2006)
- Gregorios Elias Tabé (2001.06.24 – 2019.06.22), succeeding as former Coadjutor Archeparch of Damascus of the Syriacs (1999.05.08 – 2001.06.24); previously Titular Bishop of Batnæ of the Syriacs (1995.06.24 – 1996.05.25) & Auxiliary Bishop of Antioch of the Syriacs (Lebanon) (1995.06.24 – 1997), Titular Bishop of Mardin of the Syriacs (1996.05.25 – 1999.05.08) & Bishop of Curia of the Syriacs (1997 – 1999.05.08)
- Youhanna Battah (2019.07.12 - ...)

== Source and External links ==
- Official Site (in Arabic)
- GCatholic
- Catholic-hierarchy.org
