= Huthaifa al-Batawi =

Al-Qaeda member (died 2011)

Abu Huthaifa al-Batawi (Arabic: أبو حذيفة البطاوي, romanized: ʾAbū Ḥuḏayfā al-Baṭṭāwī) was a commander in the Islamic State of Iraq (ISI) militant group and its leader in Baghdad under the emir of the ISI, Abu Bakr al-Baghdadi. He was killed during an attempted jailbreak on May 8, 2011.

Al-Batawi was accused of being the mastermind of the 2010 Baghdad church massacre in which 70 people died. His subordinates were also accused of being behind bombings against the Al Arabiya television station's Baghdad bureau and the city's central bank. On November 27, one month after the church bombing, Iraqi security forces announced they had captured Al-Batawi and a number of other ISI militants.

On May 8, 2011, in a Baghdad prison mutiny, al-Batawi overpowered a police officer who was leading him to an interrogation room, taking his weapon and shooting him dead. al-Batawi had been unshackled for interrogation. He then freed a number of other ISI prisoners associated along with him in the church massacre and killed Iraqi Brigadier General Moayeh al-Saleh, the counter-terrorism chief for Baghdad's central Karrada district, before being himself killed in a firefight. 17 people were killed overall, including 11 senior ISI militants, according to the Baghdad police spokesman. Another police source said eight inmates, most facing death sentences, were killed along with nine security officers, three of them senior officials.
