= Archdiocese of Baghdad =

The term Archdiocese (or Archeparchy) of Baghdad may refer to several ecclesiastical jurisdictions in Baghdad, Iraq:

- Patriarchal Province of Seleucia-Ctesiphon, a historical archdiocese of the Church of the East, whose patriarchs resided in Baghdad from the 8th to the 13th century
- In the Catholic Church:

- Armenian Catholic Archeparchy of Baghdad
- Chaldean Catholic Archeparchy of Baghdad
- Latin Catholic Archdiocese of Baghdad
- Syriac Catholic Archeparchy of Baghdad

- Eastern Orthodox Archdiocese of Baghdad
