= Syriac Catholic Cathedral of Saint Paul =

Coordinates: 33°30′33.62″N 36°18′59.72″E

- كاتدرائية القديس بولس السريانيه الكاثوليكيه
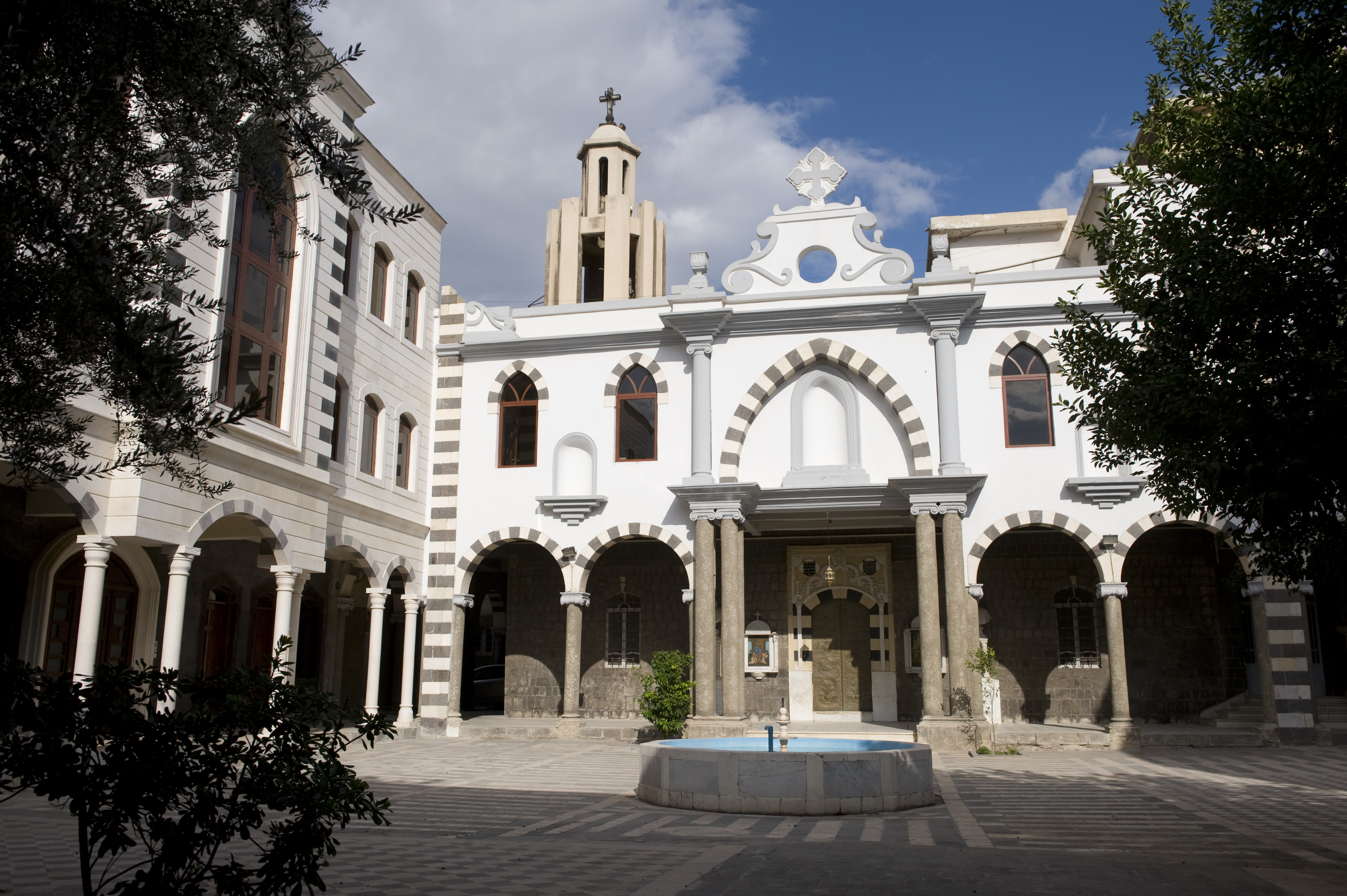
- Syriac Catholic Cathedral of Saint Paul
- Location: Damascus, Syria
- Denomination: Syriac Catholic Church

History
- Status: Cathedral

Syriac Catholic Cathedral of Saint Paul (Arabic: كَاتِدرَائِيَّة مَار بُولُس, romanized: Kâtidrâîyye Mâr Bûlüs) is the cathedral of the Syriac Catholic Church, located in Damascus, Syria. It is the see of the Syriac Catholic Archeparchy of Damascus and is located in the Christian quarter of Damascus, 100 m west of Bab Sharqi.

== See also ==
- Catholic Church in Syria
