= 2013 Baghdad Christmas Day bombings =

Terrorist incident in Iraq

- Location: Baghdad, Iraq
- Date: 25 December 2013
- Target: Christians
- Attack type: Bombings
- Deaths: 38
- Injuries: 70

On 25 December 2013, three bombings occurred in two locations in Baghdad, Iraq. They targeted Christians, killing 38 people and wounding 70 others.

== Bombings ==
Two bombs first exploded simultaneously in an outdoor market in the Christian section of Athorien in Baghdad. The market attack killed 11 people and wounded 14 others.

A few minutes later, about half a mile away, a car bomb went off near St. John's Roman Catholic Church in Baghdad's southern Dora neighborhood. According to officials, "The bomb detonated at the end of Christmas prayers as worshippers were leaving the church." This bombing killed 27 and wounded another 56.

In total, the bombings targeting the two Christian-populated sites killed 38 and wounded 70. No group claimed responsibility for the attacks.

== Reaction ==
- The United States Embassy in Baghdad condemned the attacks in a statement: "The Christian community in Iraq has suffered deliberate and senseless targeting by terrorists for many years, as have many other innocent Iraqis. The United States abhors all such attacks and is committed to its partnership with the government of Iraq to combat the scourge of terrorism."

== See also ==
- 2004 Iraq churches attacks
- 2008 attacks on Christians in Mosul
- 2010 Baghdad church attack
