= Dioceses of the Church of the East =

The dioceses of the Church of the East are listed at:

- Dioceses of the Church of the East to 1318
- Dioceses of the Church of the East, 1318–1552
- Dioceses of the Church of the East after 1552
