= Basile Georges Casmoussa =

Catholic archbishop (born 1938)

- Apostolic Visitor of the Syrian faithful for Western Europe
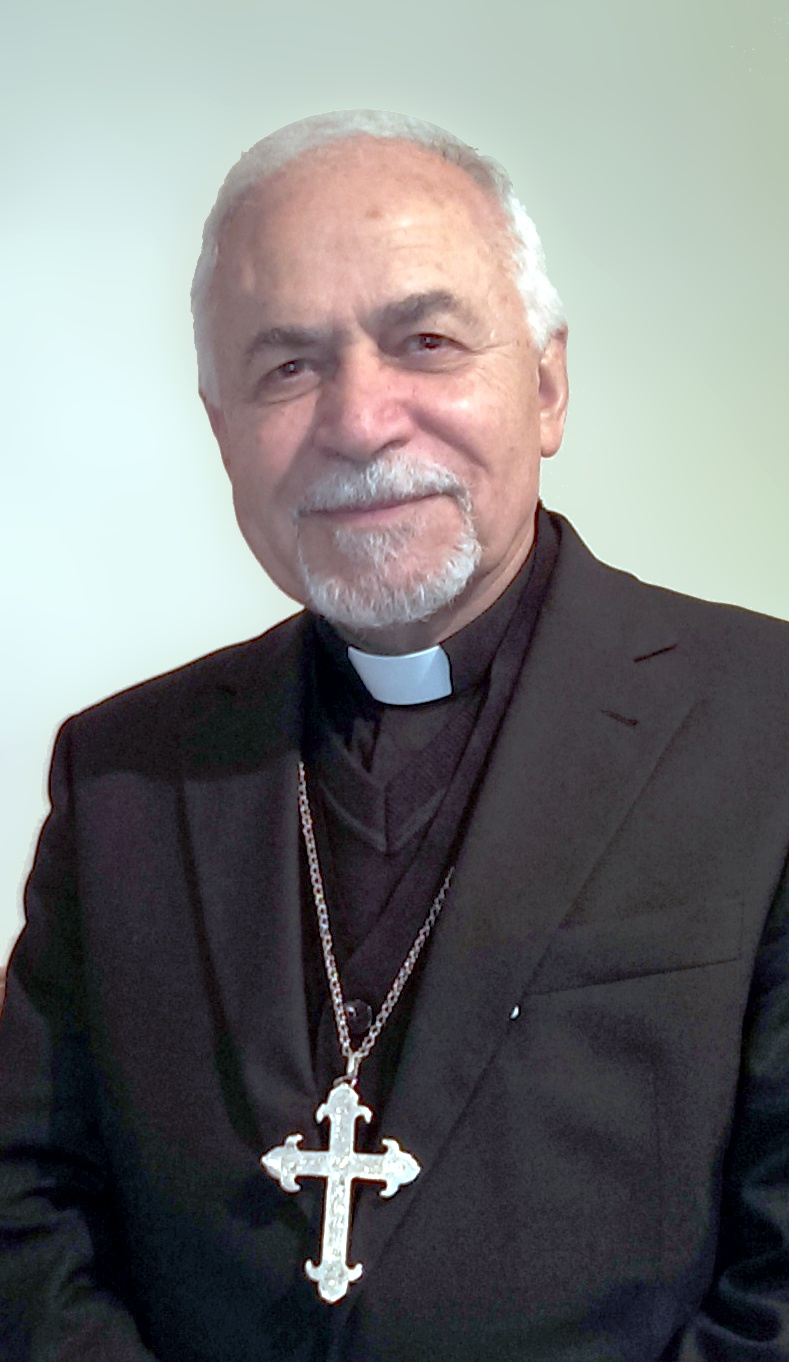
- Basile Georges Casmoussa in 2013
- Native name: باسيل جورج قس موسى
- Church: Syriac Catholic Church
- In office: 2014 – 2017
- Predecessor: Jules Mikhael Al-Jamil
- Successor: Flaviano Al-Kabalan
- Previous posts: Curial Bishop of Antioch (2011); Archeparch of Mosul (1999-2010)

Orders
- Ordination: 10 June 1962
- Consecration: 9 December 1999 by Ignatius Moses I Daoud

Personal details
- Born: 25 October 1938 (age 87) Qaraqosh, Mosul Province, Kingdom of Iraq

Basile Georges Casmoussa (born 25 October 1938 in Qaraqosh, Iraq) is a Syriac Catholic prelate who served as Apostolic Visitor of the Syrian Catholics in Western Europe from 2014 to 2017. He previously served as Archbishop of Mosul from 1999 to 2010 and as a curial official for the Patriarchate of Antioch from 2011 to 2014.

Casmoussa was ordained as a priest in June 1962 and worked for three decades as the editor of Christian Source and was active in the International Union of the Catholic Press. He was elected Archbishop of the Syriac Catholic Archeparchy of Mosul in May 1999, taking up the post in December. The eparchy of Mosul had 35,000 Syriac Catholics, 36 priests, and 55 religious. Although many Iraqi Christians have left the country because of attacks following the 2003 invasion of Iraq, Casmoussa chose to stay.

Casmoussa was kidnapped, reportedly by gunmen in Mosul, at the age of 66 on 17 January 2005. Although there were fears that this marked a new wave of attacks on Christians in Iraq, it appeared that the motive was principally for ransom, reportedly US$200,000. The kidnapping was widely condemned. The Archbishop was freed one day later on January 18 with no ransom being paid.

On Tuesday, 1 March 2011, Pope Benedict XVI, gave his consent to the canonical election (made by the Synod of Bishops of the Patriarchal Syriac Catholic Church) of Father Yohanna Petros Mouche, until now the Protosyncellus (Vicar General) of the Archeparchy of Mosul, as the new archbishop-elect of the Archeparchy of Mosul, succeeding Casmoussa. Casmoussa was transferred to the Syriac Catholic Patriarchal Curia.

On Monday, 13 January 2014, Pope Francis appointed him Apostolic Visitor of the Syriac Catholics in Western Europe.

On Wednesday, 21 June 2017, Pope Francis accepted his resignation as Apostolic Visitor of the Syriac Catholics in Western Europe and appointed Mgr. Rami Al-Kabalan as his successor.

== Positions ==
Catholic Church titles
| Preceded by Cyrille Emmanuel Benni | Archeparch of Mosul; 1999 - 2010 | Succeeded by Yohanna Petros Mouche |
| Preceded by Jules Mikhael Al-Jamil | Apostolic Visitor of the Syrian faithful for Western Europe; 2014 - 2017 | Succeeded by Rami Al-Kabalan |
