= Syriac Catholic Patriarchal Exarchate of Basra and the Gulf =

Eastern Catholic missionary jurisdiction in Iraq

The Syriac Catholic Patriarchal Exarchate of Basra, Iraq and the Gulf is an exarchate (Eastern Catholic pre-diocesan jurisdiction) of the Syriac Catholic Church sui iuris (Antiochian Rite in Syriac language) for southern Iraq and the Gulf states, notably Kuwait. It serves the extremely small Christian minority in Basra however recently the population has slightly increased due to some Christian refugees from the war torn Northern Iraq settling in Basra fleeing conflict with ISIL.

It depends directly on the Syriac Catholic Patriarch of Antioch, without belonging to his or any other ecclesiastical province.

== History ==
It was established in 1991 on territory previously without proper Ordinary of the particular church sui iuris.

== Exarchs of Basra and the Gulf ==
- Athanase Matti Shaba Matoka (1997 – 2001), while Archeparch (Archbishop) of Baghdad of the Syriacs (Iraq) (1983.07.15 – retired 2011.03.01); previously Titular Bishop of Dara Syrorum of the Syriacs (1979.08.25 – 1983.07.15) & Auxiliary Eparch of Baghdad of the Syriacs (Iraq) (1979.08.25 – 1983.07.15)
- Father Charbel Issou (2001 – 2003)
- Father Eshak Marzena (2003 – 2014)
- Monsignor Emad Ekleemes (2014 – 2020)
- Athanasius Firas Dardar (2020.09.10 – ...), while Titular Bishop of Tagritum of the Syriacs (2020.09.10 – ...)

== Source and External links ==
- GCatholic, with incumbent bio links
- Catholic Hierarchy
