= Syriac Catholic Archeparchy of Baghdad =

Syriac Catholic ecclesiastical territory in Iraq

Eparchy of Baghdad

Location
- Country: Iraq

Information
- Denomination: Catholic Church
- Sui iuris church: Syriac Catholic Church
- Rite: West Syriac Rite
- Established: 28 September 1862

Current leadership
- Pope: Leo XIV
- Patriarch: Ignatius Joseph III Yonan
- Eparch: Yousif Abba

The Syriac Catholic Archeparchy of Baghdad is a Syriac Catholic Church ecclesiastical territory or archeparchy of the Catholic Church in Iraq. It is not a metropolitan see and is directly exempt to the Syriac Catholic Patriarch of Antioch, though not part of his or any other ecclesiastical province, and in Rome depends on the Congregation for the Oriental Churches.

The cathedral is the Sayidat al-Nejat Cathedral, in the episcopal see and national capital of Baghdad.

== History ==
The Archeparchy of Baghdad was established on 28 September 1862 on Iraqi territory that had previously been without an episcopal ordinary or ecclesiastical territory of the Syriac Catholic Church.

== Episcopal ordinaries ==
Archeparchs (Archbishops) of Baghdad

- Atanasio Raffaele Ciarchi (1872 – ?)
- Athanase Ignace Nuri (1894.03.11 – retired 1908), Titular Archbishop of Hierapolis in Syria of the Syriacs (1908 – death 1946.11.09)
- Atanasio Giorgio (Cyrille) Dallal (1912.09.04 – 1926.07.31), later Archeparch (Archbishop) of Mossul of the Syriacs (Iraq) (1926.07.31 – death 1951.12.14)
- Atanasio Behnam Kalian (1929.08.06 – death 1949.02.17), Titular Bishop of Bahtnæ of the Syriacs (1921.02.26 – 1929.08.06), Auxiliary Eparch (Auxiliary Bishop) of the patriarchate Antioch of the Syriacs (Lebanon) (1921.02.26 – 1929.08.06), Auxiliary Eparch of Mardin and Amida of the Syriacs (Turkey) (1921.02.26 – 1929.08.06)
- Atanasio Paolo Hindo (1949.08.05 – death 1953.08.14), previously Titular Bishop of Arethusa of the Syriacs (1949.01.18 – 1949.08.05)
- Athanase Jean Daniel Bakose (1953.12.02 – death 1983.01.12)
- Athanase Matti Shaba Matoka (1983.07.15 – 2010.06.26), succeeded as former Titular Bishop of Dara Syrorum of the Syriacs (1979.08.25 – 1983.07.15) & Auxiliary Eparch of Baghdad of the Syriacs (1979.08.25 – 1983.07.15); later Patriarchal Exarch of Basra and the Gulf of the Syriacs (Iraq) (1997 – 2001)
- Yousif Abba (2011.03.01 – present)

== See also ==
- Syriac Catholic Archeparchy of Mossul (non-metropolitan archdiocese in northern Iraq)
- Syriac Catholic Patriarchal Exarchate of Basra and the Gulf (in southern Iraq and Kuwait)

== Source and External links ==
- GCatholic with incumbent bio links
- Catholic Hierarchy
