= Jules Mikhael Al-Jamil =

Syriac Catholic prelate

Mar Jules Mikhael Al-Jamil
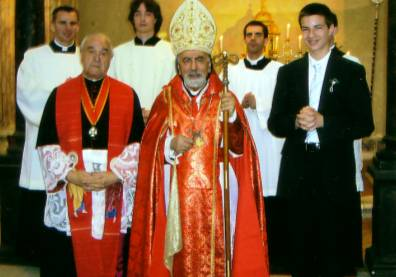
- Archbishop Jules Mikhael Al-Jamil in the centre
- Church: Syriac Catholic Church

Orders
- Ordination: 7 Jun 1964 by Qurellus Emanuel Bunni
- Consecration: 9 Nov 1986 by Ignatius Antony II Hayyek

Personal details
- Born: November 18, 1938 Bakhdida, Iraq
- Died: December 3, 2012 (aged 74) Rome, Italy
- Denomination: Syriac Catholic
- Education: Pontifical Lateran University

Jules Mikhael Al-Jamil (Syriac: ܝܘܠܝܘܣ ܡܝܟܐܝܠ ܓܡܝܠ; Arabic: يوليوس ميخائيل الجميل; November 18, 1938 – December 3, 2012) was a Syriac Catholic prelate who served as an auxiliary bishop for the Patriarchate of Antioch from 1986 until his death in 2012.

== Life ==
He was born in Bakhdida and joined the nearby Mar Behnam Monastery at a young age. After ordination to the priesthood in 1969, he moved to Lebanon where he spent several years in the Charafet monastery, the seat of the Syriac Catholic Church.

He was ordained honorary archbishop of Tikrit in 1986 and later spent several years in Europe where he received his doctorate from the Pontifical Lateran University in Rome for his thesis on Christian communities under Islamic rule.

He died of a stroke in Rome on December 3, 2012, and was buried in his birthplace in Iraq.
