= Syriac Catholic Archeparchy of Mosul =

Syriac Catholic ecclesiastical territory in Iraq

Archeparchy of Mosul
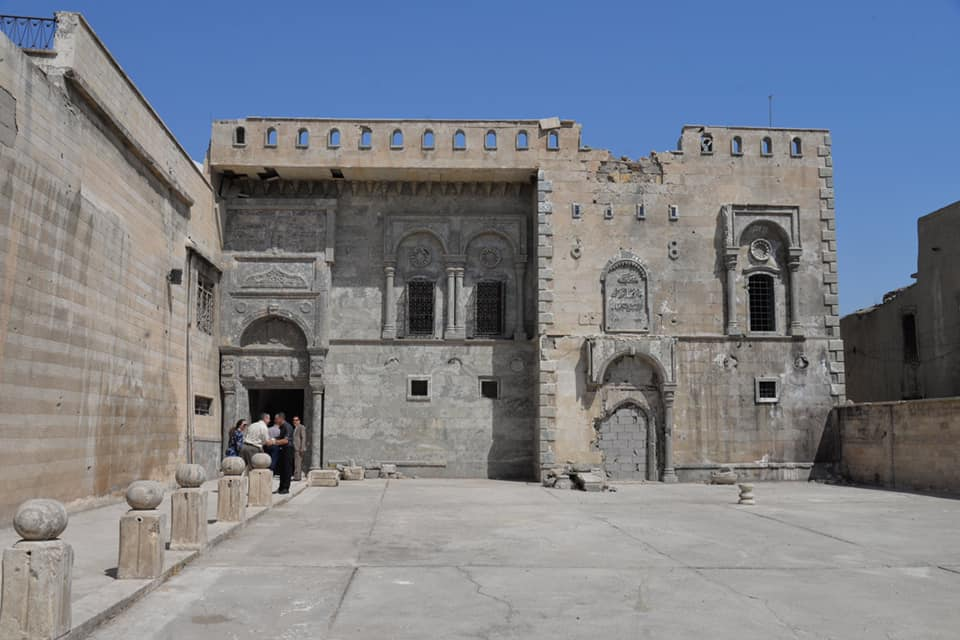

Location
- Country: Iraq

Statistics
- Population: 45,000
- Parishes: 15

Information
- Denomination: Catholic Church
- Sui iuris church: Syriac Catholic Church
- Rite: West Syriac Rite
- Established: 1790
- Secular priests: 56

Current leadership
- Pope: Leo XIV
- Patriarch: Ignatius Joseph III Yonan
- Eparch: Younan (Benedict Qusay Mubarak Abdullah) Hano

The Syriac Catholic Archeparchy of Mosul (or informally Mossul of the Syriacs) is a Syriac Catholic Church ecclesiastical territory or archeparchy in northern Iraq. It is not a metropolitan see and is immediately exempt to the Syriac Catholic Patriarch of Antioch and the Roman Congregation for the Oriental Churches, and not part of any ecclesiastical province. Its cathedral is the Syriac Catholic Cathedral in the episcopal see of Mosul.

== History ==
The Archeparchy of Mosul was established in 1790 from territory with no previous Syriac Catholic ordinary or territory.

== Statistics ==
As of 2014, it pastorally served 45,000 Catholics in 15 parishes and two missions with 82 priests (56 diocesan, 26 religious), one deacon, 36 lay religious (33 brothers, three sisters) and 15 seminarians.

== Episcopal ordinaries ==
Archeparchs (Archbishops) of Mosul

- Cyrille Behnam Benni (1862 – 1893.10.12), later Eparch of Mardin and Amida of the Syrians (Turkey) (1893.10.12 – 1897.09.13), Patriarch of Antioch of the Syrians (Lebanon) ([1893.10.12] 1894.05.18 – death 1897.09.13)
- Grégoire Pierre Habra (born Syria) (1901.08.16 – 1924.03.24), later Metropolitan Archbishop of Damascus of the Syrians (Syria) (1924.03.24 – death 1933.03.21)
- Atanasio Giorgio (Cyrille) Dallal (1926.07.31 – death 1951.12.14), previously Archeparch of Baghdad of the Syrians (Iraq) (1912.09.04 – 1926.07.31)
- Jules Georges Kandela (1952.03.07 – 1959.08.23), previously Titular Bishop of Cephas ([1951.04.26] 1951.08.15 – 1952.03.07); later Auxiliary Eparch of the patriarchate Antioch of the Syrians (Lebanon) (1959.08.23 – 1971) & Titular Archbishop of Seleucia Pieria (1959.08.23 – death 1980.04.15)
- Cyrille Emmanuel Benni (1959.10.23 – death 1999.12.09)
- Basile Georges Casmoussa (1999.09.22 – 2011.03.01), later Bishop of Curia of the Syrians (2011.03.01 – ...), Apostolic Visitor in Western Europe of the Syrians (2014.01.13 – 2017.06.21), Apostolic Visitor in Australia of the Syrians (2017.06.21 – ...)
- Yohanna Petros Mouche (2011.03.01 – ...), no previous prelature.

== See also ==
- List of Catholic dioceses in Iraq

== Sources and external links ==
- GCatholic, with Google photo - data for all sections
