= Qaraqosh =

Town in Nineveh, Iraq

Qaraqosh ܩܪܩܘ݂ܫ
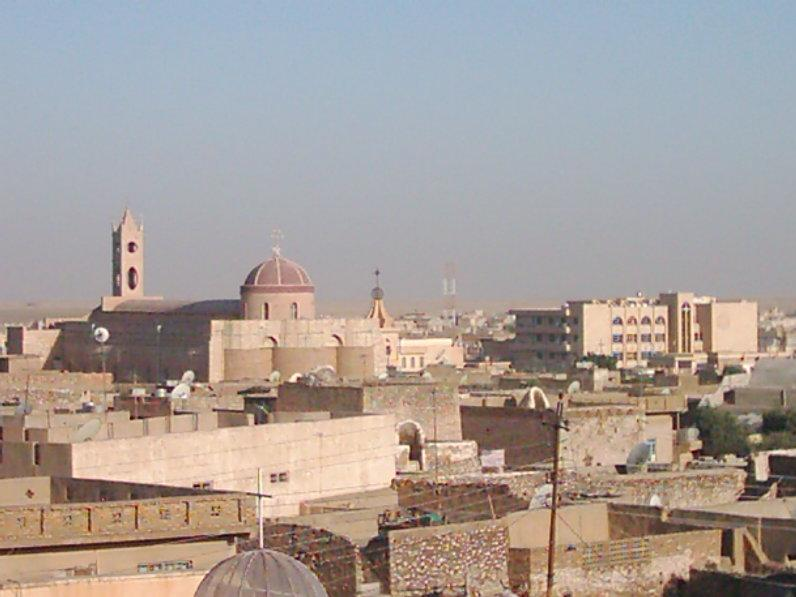
- A view of Bakhdida

- Location within Iraq
- Coordinates: 36°16′11″N 43°22′39″E
- Country: Iraq
- Governorate: Nineveh
- Municipality: Al-Hamdaniya District

Government
  - Mayor: Isam Behnam Da'aboul

Population
  - Total: 35,000 (current)
- 50,000 (prior to IS invasion)
- Time zone: UTC+3 (Arabia Standard Time)

Qaraqosh (Syriac: ܩܪܩܘ݂ܫ, romanized: Qaraqoš; Arabic: بغديدا, romanized: Baḡdīda (official name), or Arabic: بخديدا, romanized: Baḵdīda, also known as al-Ḥamdāniyya or Qara-Qūš; a Turkic placename meaning "Black Bird") is a city in the Nineveh Governorate, of Iraq located about 32 kilometres (20 mi) southeast of the city of Mosul and 60 kilometres (37 mi) west of Erbil amid agricultural lands, close to the ruins of the ancient Assyrian cities Kalhu and Nineveh. The city has an Assyrian Christian majority.

Qaraqosh is connected to the main city of Mosul by two main roads. The first runs through the Assyrian towns of Bartella and Karamlesh, which connects to the city of Erbil as well. The second, which was gravel before being paved in the 1990s, is direct to Mosul. All of its Assyrian Christian citizens fled to the Kurdistan Region after the IS invasion on August 6, 2014. The town was under control of IS until October 19, 2016, when it was liberated as part of the Battle of Mosul after which residents have begun to return. According to archbishop Nizar Semaan, by July 2024 about half of the city's original 50,000 residents had returned to Qaraqosh.

Local Assyrians, who are ethnically distinct from Arabs and Kurds, speak the Qaraqosh dialect of Northeastern Neo-Aramaic.

== Etymology ==
The present name of the town, Qaraqosh, is first attested in a source from the sixteenth century. It is of Turkic origin, meaning 'Black Bird', and was introduced either by the Ottomans after their conquest of the area at the beginning of the sixteenth century or by the Turkoman rulers of the region in the fifteenth century. The local population, however, when speaking in their Aramaic dialect, still refer to the town by its former name. The name Bakhdida (Syriac: ܒܝܬ ܟܘܕܝܕܐ; Beth Khdeda), is of uncertain origin and when translated from the Syriac language it has two components Beth which means "house", and Khodida which could either mean "Youths" in Aramaic or actually "Baghdadak" a diminutive form of Baghdad, Old Persian meaning "God's gift". Some also think that Bakhdida comes from the Aramaic Beth Deta, meaning "Land of the Kite".

== Security ==
As of October 2016, the city is under the control of the Nineveh Plain Protection Units. On November 25, 2017; Nineveh Plain Protection Units (NPU) celebrated the completion of its new military camp in Bakhdida, Nineveh Plain.

== Education ==
Students from the village were harassed in University of Mosul; many female students were forced to wear an Islamic dress for fear of being attacked. On May 2, 2010, a convoy of buses carrying students from Bakhdida to the University of Mosul was the target of a coordinated attack, which killed and injured more than a hundred.

The Iraqi Ministry of Education started the construction of a subsidiary of the University of Mosul which in 2014 became the University of AL-Hamdaniya, which is planned to serve the whole Nineveh Plains region. The University of AL-Hamdaniya currently consists of two colleges: The college of Education and the college of Administration and Economics. The University is based at the Mosul-Erbil road, Al-Hamdaniya intersection.

== History ==
=== Pre-Christian accounts ===
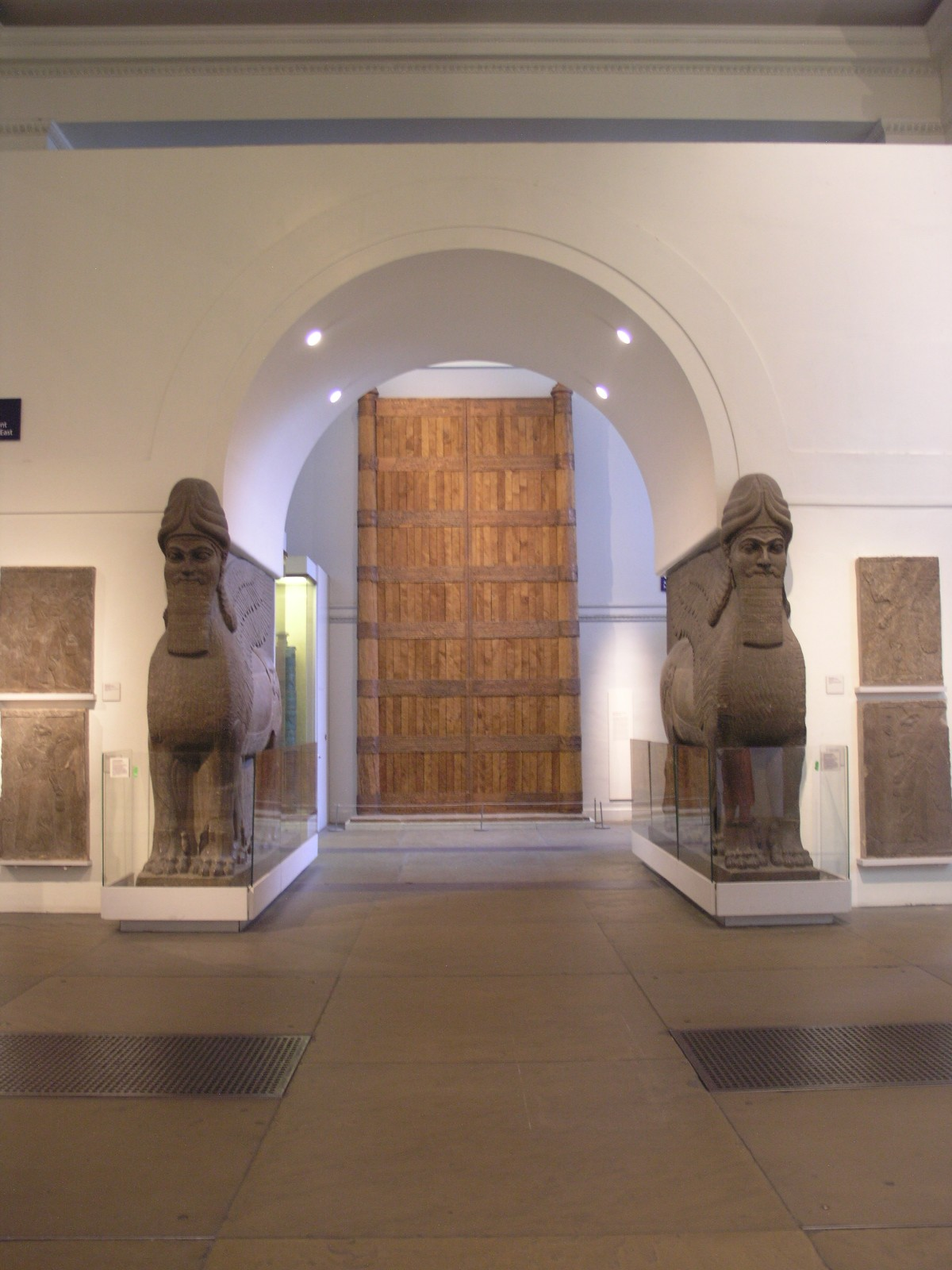
"Balawat Gates" displayed at the British Museum

It is thought that the ancient city of Rasin mentioned in some texts, the second city built by the Assyrian king Nimrud, was in Bakhdida.

=== Early Christian history ===
The Assyrians of Bakhdida became Christians during early Christianity. With the Christological disputes of the 4th century, they followed the Church of the East teachings, but switched to the Syriac Orthodox Church through the influence of Shapur of Baghdeda in the 7th century and the arrival of Assyrian refugees from Tikrit in the 11th century.

=== Raids of Persians and Kurds ===
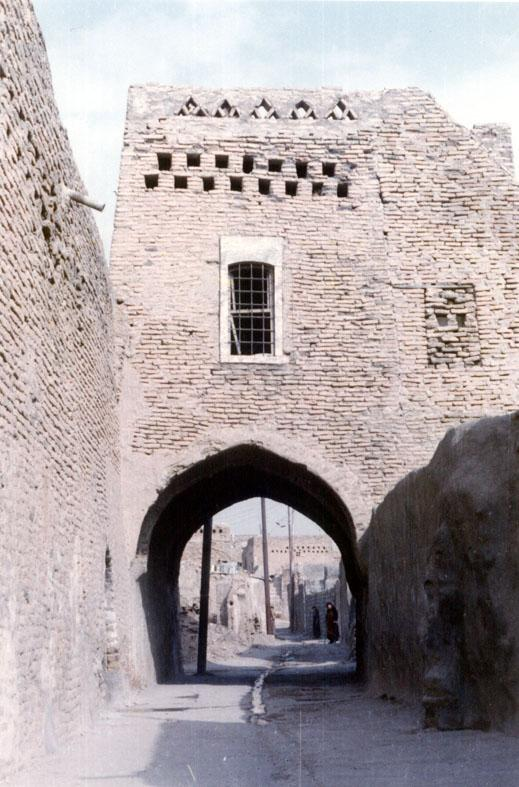
"Qaṭartā d'Beth īnā", an example of brick constructions in the old centre

In their literature and writings, the Assyrians of Bakhdida remember vividly the raids of the Persians and Kurds on their village and churches. In 1171, while the governors of Mosul and Damascus were fighting each other, the Kurds used the opportunity to attack the Mor Mattai Monastery. According to the 13th-century writer Bar Hebraeus, in 1261 the Kurds came down to Mosul, killing many Christians who refused to follow Islam and looting their homes and churches. The Kurds then occupied the Monastery of Saint John of Dailam and killed many of its nuns and those who had sought refuge there. In 1288, a battle took place between the Kurds and Iraqi Turkmen near Baghdida. In 1324 Baghdida was attacked by the Kurds again, in which many homes and four churches were burned.

=== Afshar–Ottoman wars ===
In the early 18th century, Persians under the leadership of Nader Shah invaded the Mosul region and most of the inhabitants of Baghdida escaped to Mosul with all their valuables, in accordance with the governor's orders. Mosul was harassed and then besieged for months. However, the Christians defended it and after months of blockade, the Persians finally signed a peace agreement with Mosul's governor Hasan Pasha Al Jalili, and withdrew in 1743. To reward the Christians for their bravery, the Jalili governor permitted many churches in the Mosul region to be restored.

=== After the 2003 US invasion ===
==== Politics since 2005 ====
The people of Bakhdida got the chance to vote for the first time on 30 January 2005. Ayad Allawi led the votes in the town. However many Assyrians, Shabaks and Yazidis were not allowed to vote, which led to demonstrations against the results.

Ayad Allawi Secular list	3,080	31%
Nahrain list (Assyrian list)	2,664	27%
Assyrian Democratic Movement	2,466	25%
Kurdistan Alliance	744	7%

The next parliamentary elections on 7 March 2010, saw the rise of local candidates with the Assyrian Democratic Movement coming second. Only 52% of registered voters participated in this election. Due to the rise of extremism in Iraq shortly after the US-led invasion, many of the villagers in Mosul and Baghdad were targeted for being Christians.

On 22 November 2006 Yeshu' Hadaya, the leader of a National Syriac movement was assassinated in Bakhdida.

=== IS attacks and invasion ===
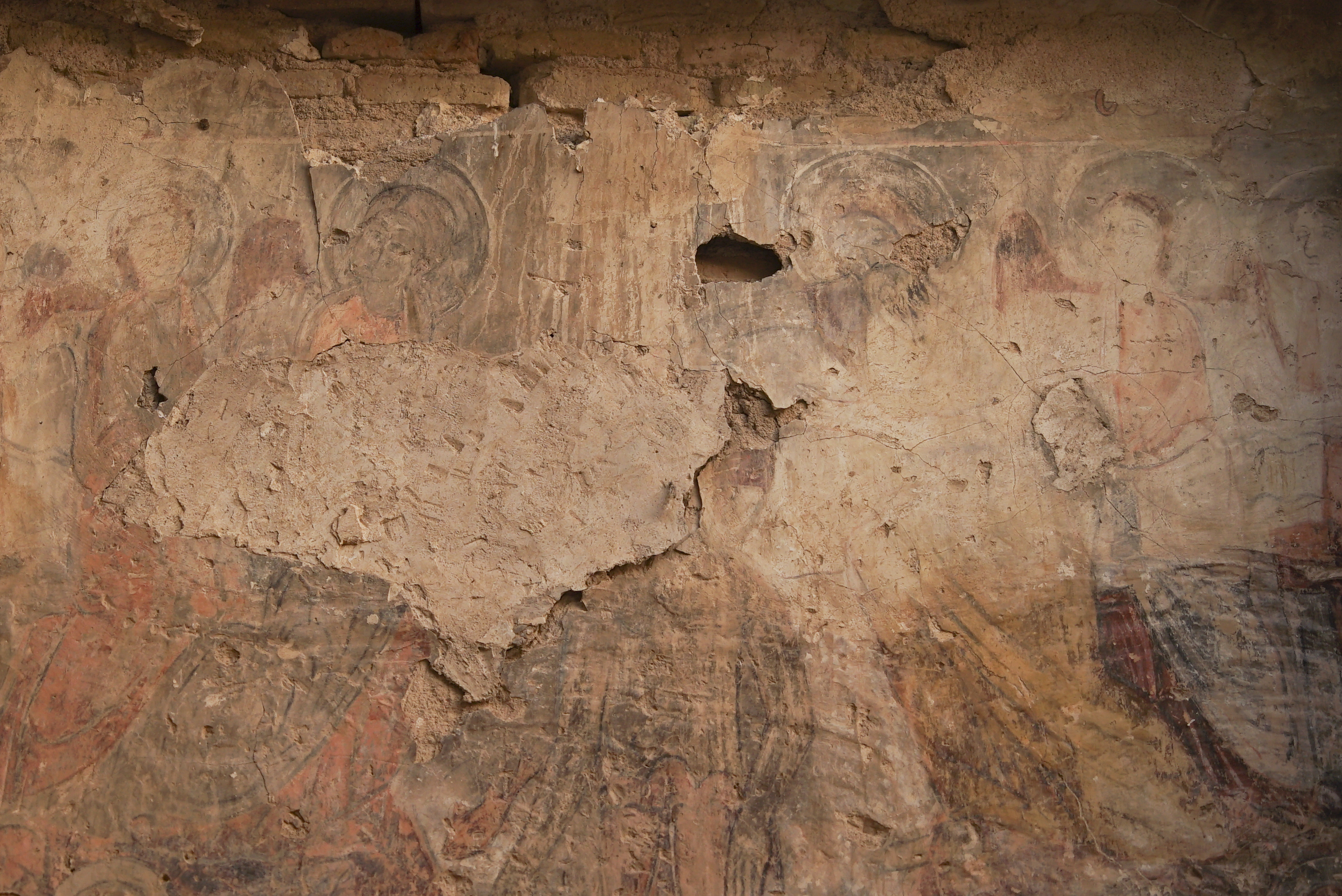
Wall of a church destroyed by ISIS in Bakhdidag

At the beginning of July 2014, IS forces attempted to occupy the city. The Kurdish Peshmerga and the Assyrian Qaraqosh Protection Committee successfully defended it, while elders, women, and children fled to neighboring towns, thus joining other Christian refugees from nearby Mosul that had previously escaped the city in fear of the extremists. The Islamists proceeded to cut off the town's water supply. This, together with the rise in the price of oil following IS's invasion of nearby oil field and an embargo imposed by IS forcing nearby Muslim villages to stop trade with Bakhdida, rendered life difficult in the town also burdened with incoming refugees. On August 6, 2014, the Kurdish troops withdrew from the city and the next day Islamists from IS invaded the city. Much of the population, including recent arrivals, was left joining the 150,000 Assyrians fleeing, though they were forced to walk towards Erbil without their cars and possessions as Kurdish forces feared Islamist infiltration.

All of its citizens fled to Kurdistan Region after the IS invasion on 6 August 2014. The town was under control of IS until 19 October 2016, when it was liberated as part of the Battle of Mosul.

=== Post–IS ===
Currently, the Nineveh Plain Protection Units run the security profile in the city and participated alongside the Iraqi Army in the liberation efforts of the city.

On 26 September 2023, a fire broke out at the Al Haytham Wedding Hall during a Syriac Catholic wedding in the city, which killed at least 114 people, and injured 150.

== Geography ==
It is 32 miles (51 km) southeast of Mosul.

== Climate ==
Bakhdida has a hot-summer Mediterranean climate (Köppen climate classification Csa). Most rain falls in the winter. The average annual temperature in Bakhdida is 20.7 °C (69.3 °F). About 468 mm (18.43 in) of precipitation falls annually.

Climate data for Bakhdida
Month	Jan	Feb	Mar	Apr	May	Jun	Jul	Aug	Sep	Oct	Nov	Dec	Year
Mean daily maximum °C (°F)	12.6 (54.7)	14.9 (58.8)	18.6 (65.5)	24.6 (76.3)	32.1 (89.8)	38.8 (101.8)	42.7 (108.9)	42.5 (108.5)	38.2 (100.8)	30.8 (87.4)	21.9 (71.4)	14.7 (58.5)	27.7 (81.9)
Mean daily minimum °C (°F)	2.1 (35.8)	3.6 (38.5)	6.3 (43.3)	10.6 (51.1)	15.8 (60.4)	20.0 (68.0)	23.4 (74.1)	22.5 (72.5)	17.9 (64.2)	12.6 (54.7)	8.3 (46.9)	3.5 (38.3)	12.2 (54.0)
Average precipitation mm (inches)	78 (3.1)	79 (3.1)	88 (3.5)	64 (2.5)	25 (1.0)	0 (0)	0 (0)	0 (0)	1 (0.0)	15 (0.6)	49 (1.9)	69 (2.7)	468 (18.4)
Source: Climate-Data.org, Climate data

== Archaeology ==
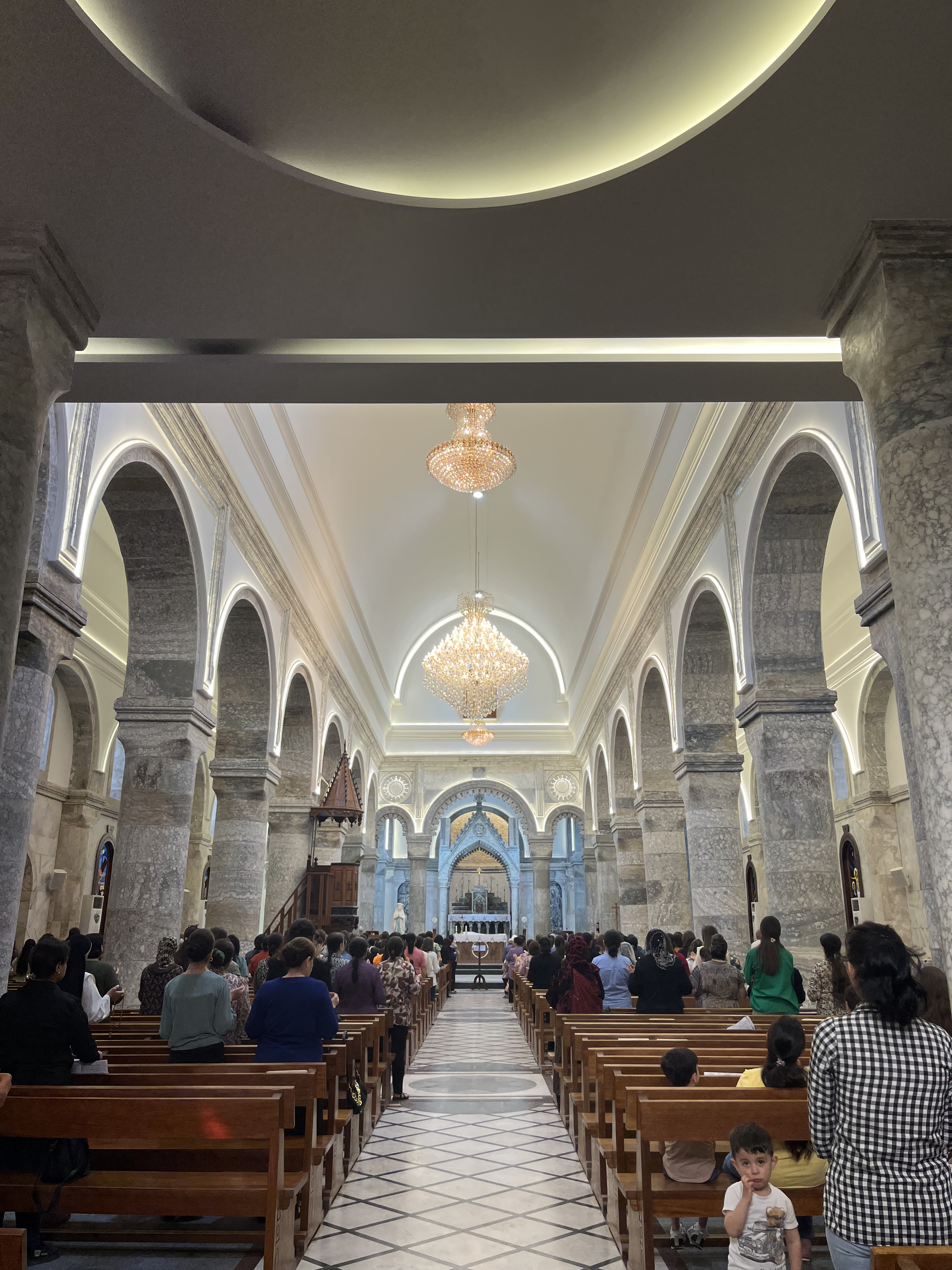
The Immaculate Church in Bakhdida

Since the late 19th century, various locations on the outskirts of the town were excavated by Hormuzd Rassam. In Balawat (the ancient Assyrian city of Imgur-Enlil) a number of Assyrian artifacts have been excavated; they are currently displayed in the British Museum and Mosul Museum. There is a lot of interest in the archaeology of Baghdida today. It has many Assyrian remains, like those of Tel Bashmoni (Beth Shmoni), Tel Muqortaya, Tel Karamles, Tel Mar Bihnam and others. These mounds were fortresses, temples or buildings that belonged to the Assyrian capital of Nimrud. Throughout 1922, 1927, and 1935, archaeologists found gold pieces and cylinder seals, as well as an Assyrian statue (now in Mosul museum) in a well in the church of Mar Zina. In 1942 an Assyrian bathroom and several graves were found near the church of Bashmoni. Furthermore, during the 1980s excavations in the grounds of the Church of Mar Youhanna (Saint John), archaeologists found human remains inside graves in the eastern side and at a depth of one and a half metres. These graves were built with typical Assyrian large rectangular bricks.

References to Athur (Assyria) continued in texts from Bakhdida. Mapharian Athanasius Ibrahim II of Tur Abdin visited Tikrit, Baghdad, and Arbil to attend to his congregation. According to Afram Abdal al-Khouri and his book al-Lu'lu' al-Nadheed fi Tareekh Deir Mar Bihnam al-Shaheed(The Layers of Pearls in the History of the Monastery of Martyred Mar Bihnam), 1951, p. 219, Sony writes: "in 1365 the Mapharian came to Athur or Mosul and was welcomed by Nour al-Din the Chief of Baghdeda … " (Sony 1998, 699). Last but not least, Sony writes that in 1294–1295 (according to the Mar Bihnam monastery archives) a certain king "came to Lower Athur, the city of Saint Mar Bihnam … " (Sony 1998, 95).

== See also ==
- Assyrian homeland
- Assyrians in Iraq
- Proposals for Assyrian autonomy in Iraq
- List of Assyrian settlements
- Balawat
- Bartella
- Karamlish
- List of largest cities in Iraq
