= Saint Elian =

Saint Elian may refer to:

- Saint Elian (Wales) (fl. 450) also Llanelian, Catholic saint who founded a church in North Wales
- Saint Elian (Syria) (died 284 CE), Roman Orthodox saint from Homs martyred for refusing to renounce Christianity
  - Church of Saint Elian in Homs, Syria
  - Monastery of St. Elian in Al-Qaryatayn, Syria

== See also ==
- Elian (disambiguation)
- Eglwysilan
- Llanelian (disambiguation)
