= Elian =

Elian or Elián (Spanish) or Élian (French) can refer to:

== People ==
- Saint Elian (Syria) (died 284)
  - Church of Saint Elian (Arabic: كنيسة مار اليان, Kaneesat Mar Elian) is a church in Homs, Syria
  - Monastery of St. Elian a Syriac Catholic monastery near the town of Al-Qaryatayn, along a trade route between the two major cities of Palmyra
- Saint Elian (Wales), a 5th-century Welsh saint
- Elián González, a Cuban boy at the center of a 2000 custody and immigration controversy
- Elián Herrera (baseball) (born 1985), Dominican Republic baseball player
- Elián Herrera (model) (born 1991), Venezuelan model
- Élian Périz (1984) Spanish female runner who specializes in the 800 metres
- Michael Elian

== Other ==
- Elian's Dublin, a Spanish international school in Bray, County Wicklow, Ireland
- Elián (film), a 2017 documentary film about Elián González
- Eretrian school, a school of philosophy also called the Elian School

== See also ==
- Eliana
