= Julian Yacoub Mourad =

Syrian Catholic archbishop (born 1968)

The Most Reverend Julian Yacoub Mourad
- Archbishop of Homs of the Syriacs
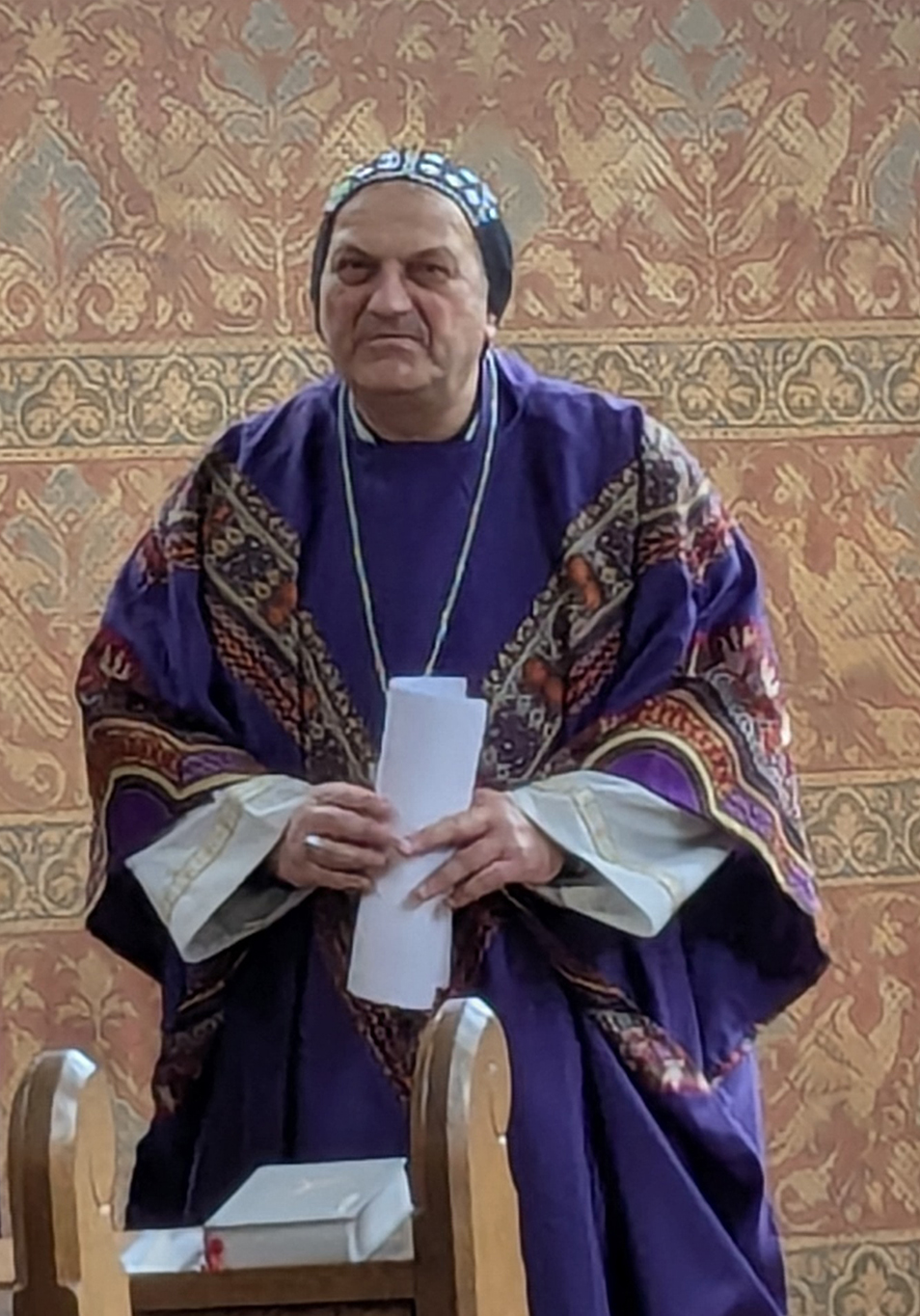
- Church: Syriac Catholic Church
- Appointed: 7 January 2023
- Installed: 3 March 2023
- Predecessor: Théophile Philippe Barakat
- Other post: Prior of the Monastery of Saint Elian (2000–2015)

Orders
- Ordination: 2 June 1991 (deacon) by Ignace Antoine II Hayek; 28 August 1993 (priest) by Raboula Antoine Beylouni
- Consecration: 3 March 2023 by Ignace Joseph III Younan

Personal details
- Born: Jacques Mourad; 28 June 1968 (age 58) Aleppo, Aleppo Governorate, Syrian Arab Republic
- Denomination: Catholicism

Ordination history
History
Diaconal ordination
- Ordained by: Patriarch Ignace Antoine II Hayek
Priestly ordination
- Ordained by: Archbishop Raboula Antoine Beylouni
Episcopal consecration
- Principal consecrator: Patriarch Ignace Joseph III Younan
- Co-consecrators: Archbishop Denys Antoine Chahda, Archbishop Youhanna Battah, Bishop Flaviano Al-Kabalan, Bishop Matthias Mrad

Julian Yacoub Mourad (born Jacques Mourad, 28 June 1968) is a Syriac Catholic (Note: The Syriac Catholic Church is one of the autonomous Eastern Catholic particular churches that is in full communion with the Pope of the Catholic Church, and uses the West Syriac (or Antiochian) Rite.) monk and prelate who has been the Archbishop of Homs since 2023. He was previously the prior of the Monastery of Saint Elian, near al-Qaryatayn, Syria, from 2000 to 2015.

He was born and raised in Aleppo, Syria, as a member of a Syriac Catholic family that was originally from Turkey. Mourad graduated from a Catholic seminary in Lebanon and shortly after became a deacon, a monk, and a priest. He was a member of a monastic community founded by the Italian Jesuit priest Paolo Dall'Oglio and worked with him for several years to restore the Monastery of St. Moses the Abyssinian in Syria, until 2000. At that time Mourad started to restore the Monastery of Saint Elian and became its head. He was also the priest of the nearby town of al-Qaryatayn, in Homs Governorate. He stayed there until 2015, when Islamic State advanced into the area and took him and some other Christian residents as prisoners. After over four months in captivity he was able to escape, and later went to Iraq, where he lived at a monastery in Sulaymaniyah and assisted refugees fleeing the war with IS in Iraq. Mourad was elected as Archbishop of Homs by the Syriac Catholic Synod of Bishops in 2022 and was confirmed by Pope Francis in 2023.

== Biography ==
Julian Yacoub Mourad was born as Jacques Mourad on 28 June 1968, in Aleppo, Syria. His grandfather, also named Jacques Mourad, was a member of the Syriac Orthodox Church in southeastern Turkey, but had to flee during the Sayfo, the genocide by the Ottoman Empire, in 1915. He settled in Aleppo, modern-day Syria, and later left Orthodoxy for Catholicism because of a quarrel with an Orthodox bishop, joining the Syriac Catholic Church.

When he was growing up, Mourad attended the Armenian Catholic School in Aleppo and was taken by his father to Mass at Syriac, Armenian, Greek, Maronite, Chaldean, and Roman Catholic churches. He began studying for the priesthood at a Catholic seminary in Lebanon at the age of eighteen. There he obtained degrees in philosophy, theology, and liturgy. During that time he also visited the Monastery of St. Moses the Abyssinian (Mar Musa) in Syria, where he met the Italian Jesuit priest Paolo Dall'Oglio in 1986. Dall-Oglio was fluent in Arabic and had been ordained in the Syriac Catholic rite. They worked on a project of restoring the monastery, which dates back to the 6th century, and they also formed a monastic community known as al-Khalil, which was dedicated to starting dialogue between the Muslim and Christian population.

Mourad was ordained as a deacon in Lebanon on 2 June 1991, by Ignace Antoine II Hayek, Patriarch of Antioch of the Syriacs and head of the Syriac Catholic Church. He returned to Syria and on 20 July 1993, became a professed member of the Monastery of St. Moses the Abyssinian. Mourad was also ordained as a priest on 28 August 1993, at the Cathedral of Our Lady of the Assumption in Aleppo, by Syriac Catholic Archbishop Raboula Antoine Beylouni. Mourad first visited the 5th-century Monastery of Saint Elian (Mar Elian) near the town of al-Qaryatayn, Homs Governorate, in 1996, and was asked by his bishop to begin a project to restore it in 2000. He accepted the task, becoming the head of the monastery as its prior, and also became the village priest of al-Qaryatayn. He was involved in the restoration and archeological excavations at the monastery over the next fifteen years, and in his role as a priest he promoted cooperation with both the Muslim and Syriac Orthodox population in the town. The Muslims in al-Qaryatayn called him Ya Muhtaram ("Oh respected One"), and later they called him Abouna ("our Father").

After the Syrian civil war broke out and the fighting reached their town in 2012, Mourad allowed thousands of people from the nearby areas, both Christian and Muslim, to take shelter there. The other members of the monastic community left the monastery, but Mourad stayed behind. In May 2015, the Islamic State (IS) captured Palmyra and the surrounding area in Homs Governorate. On 21 May 2015, Jacques Mourad and a deacon named Boutros were kidnapped by IS. He spent the next four months and twenty days as a prisoner of IS. Three months into his captivity, 250 other people from al-Qaryatayn were also taken hostage. Mourad was initially sent to Raqqa before being taken to Palmyra, where the other Christian captives from the village were held. During his time as a prisoner of IS in Raqqa he was kept in a bathroom and was beaten and threatened with execution unless he converted from Christianity to Islam, which he refused. When an IS member put a knife to his throat and threatened him, Mourad said "Lord, have mercy on me!" and the man went away. He spent much of his time praying while being held prisoner.

They were kept in Palmyra for 25 days before being released to al-Qaryatayn, after signing a document that put restrictions on them, including not allowing them to leave the village. Mourad was able conduct religious services, but people were mostly confined to their homes, and being in IS-controlled territory, the town was bombed by Syrian and Russian aircraft. With the assistance of some of the Muslim residents in al-Qaryatayn, he was able to be smuggled out across the desert on a motorcycle to the government-controlled city of Homs. Over the next several days he and his Muslim friends were able to organize the escape of another 58 Christian residents. After escaping from captivity, a few months later, in 2016, he went to Sulaymaniyah, Kurdistan Region, Iraq, where he also worked in a Syriac Catholic mission serving refugees from the Nineveh Plains. Since the IS invasion of Northern Iraq in 2014, many Iraqi Christians fled the area, including into Iraqi Kurdistan. By 2020 the al-Khalil monastic community that Mourad was part of had seven members, who were scattered among Iraq, Syria, and Italy, and they had a small presence at the Monastery of Maryam al-Adhra in Sulaymaniyah. Mourad also spent time in Europe advocating for ending the Syrian civil war. As of November 2019 he was still living at the Monastery of Maryam al-Adhra in Sulaymaniyah, Iraq, and many of the refugees that had been there returned to their homes.

In March 2022 he oversaw the start of restoration work at the Monastery of Saint Elian, which had been destroyed by IS militants. In June 2022 he was elected as Archbishop of Homs by the Synod of Bishops of the Syriac Catholic Church, and his appointment was confirmed by Pope Francis on 7 January 2023. His consecration as bishop took place on 3 March 2023, at the Holy Spirit Cathedral in Homs, with his principal consecrator being Ignace Joseph III Younan, the Patriarch of Antioch of the Syriacs. Also present at his consecration were Cardinal Mario Zenari, the apostolic nuncio to Syria, Melkite Greek Catholic Patriarch Youssef Absi, Syriac Orthodox Patriarch His Holiness Moran Mor Ignatius Aphrem II, and many bishops. Mourad took the name Julian Yacoub as a bishop. Until then the archeparchy (Note: An archeparchy is the Eastern Catholic equivalent of an archdiocese in the Latin Church.) of Homs has not had an archbishop since the death of Théophile Philippe Barakat in 2020. The archeparchy that Mourad presides over includes the Monastery of Saint Elian and al-Qaryatayn, and while it is a metropolitan see without any suffragan dioceses, it includes the titular sees of Hama and Nabk. Since becoming archbishop, he has worked to reestablish regional committees for the purpose of training catechists across Syria, being responsible for catechism in the entire country.

== Personal life ==
Mourad speaks Arabic, English, French, Italian, and Syriac.

In November 2023 he stated that the two-state solution should be implemented to resolve the Israeli–Palestinian conflict and called for peace both in Palestine and in the rest of the Middle East.

He welcomed the fall of the Assad regime in December 2024 and met with the new authorities in Homs, who promised Christians would have freedom of worship. However, in January 2025 he told Agenzia Fides that prisons are being filled up and people are disappearing. He also stated that only Christian and Alawite soldiers have been disarmed, and crimes against Christians are taking place, including torture and murder for refusing to convert to Islam.

In a conference in Rome, organised by pontifical foundation Aid to the Church in Need, Maurad told the audience that "the Church in Syria is dying", saying that none of the efforts made by the Church, both in Syria and abroad, are making a difference: "because the causes are not related to the Church, but rather to the country’s disastrous political and economic situation. You can’t stop a wave of migration without first establishing a well-defined political government model in Syria and a solid security system". He went on to say that Syria risks turning into Afghanistan. "The Syrian people continue to suffer violence, reprisals, and tragic and regrettable events that undermine all the international claims and popular demands to put an end to this bloodbath. We are become more and more like Afghanistan. We don’t have that level of violence yet, but we’re not that far off either. People are under all sorts of pressure. Don’t think we are heading towards greater freedom, religious or otherwise."

In the same conference, the Archbishop was critical of an alleged peace deal with Israel over the status of the Golan Heights, which he fears would "deprive the inhabitants of Damascus of water sources and enslave them. Who would accept a treaty such as this? Where are the human rights values that should help ensure that decisions are fair for both parties?"

== Notes ==
Catholic Church titles
Vacant Title last held by Théophile Philippe Barakat	Archbishop of Homs of the Syriacs; 2023–present	Incumbent
