= Popoli (disambiguation) =

Popoli may refer to:

- Popoli (magazine), international magazine of the Jesuits in Italy
- Popoli, Kastoria, historical region in Kastoria regional unit
- Giacinto de Popoli, Italian painter of the Baroque period
- Popoli until 2023 name of Popoli Terme, comune and town in the province of Pescara in the Abruzzo region of Italy

== See also ==
- Pepoli
