= Flaviano Al-Kabalan =

Syriac Catholic bishop (born 1979)

Most Reverend Flaviano Rami Al-Kabalan
- Titular Bishop of Aretusa dei Siri
- Church: Syriac Catholic Church
- Appointed: 28 March 2020
- Other posts: Patriarchal Procurator to the Holy See (since 2020); Apostolic Visitor for Syriac Catholics in Western Europe (since 2017); Apostolic Administrator of Homs (2021–2023)

Orders
- Ordination: 16 July 2005 by Théophile Georges Kassab
- Consecration: 13 September 2020 by Ignatius Joseph III Yonan

Personal details
- Born: Rami Al-Kabalan; 17 July 1979 (age 46) Zaydal, Syria
- Education: Pontifical Lateran University, Pontifical Oriental Institute
- Motto: In verbo Tuo laxabo rete

Flaviano Rami Al-Kabalan (born 17 July 1979) is Syrian-born Syriac Catholic hierarch, who serves as the Patriarchal Procurator of the Syriac Catholic Patriarchate of Antioch to the Holy See. He is the Titular Bishop of Aretusa dei Siri and the Apostolic Visitor for Syriac Catholics in Western Europe.

== Early life and priesthood ==
Al-Kabalan was born in Zaydal, near Homs, Syria. He began his ecclesiastical studies at the Minor Seminary in Aleppo before moving to the Major Seminary in Charfet, Lebanon. He later moved to Rome, residing at the Pontifical Greek College of Saint Athanasius and the Pontifical French Seminary. He was ordained a priest by Archbishop Théophile Georges Kassab for the Syriac Catholic Archeparchy of Homs on 16 July 2005.

He holds a license in theology from the Pontifical Lateran University and a Doctorate in Eastern Canon Law from the Pontifical Oriental Institute (2015). From 2007 to 2011, he served as a parish priest in Al-Nabk and Yabroud. In 2013, he was appointed assistant to the patriarchal procurator in Rome and became the Postulator for the cause of beatification of Bishop Flavianus Michael Malke.

== Apostolic and Episcopal ministry ==
On 21 June 2017, while still a priest, Al-Kabalan was appointed by Pope Francis as the Apostolic Visitor for the Syriac Catholic faithful in Western Europe.

On 27 March 2020, Patriarch Ignatius Joseph III Yonan appointed him as the Procurator of the Patriarchate of Antioch to the Holy See. The following day, 28 March 2020, Pope Francis appointed him Titular Bishop of Aretusa dei Siri, at which time he assumed the name Flaviano. On 30 March 2020, he was also named a Counselor of the Apostolic Penitentiary.

He received his episcopal consecration on 13 September 2020 at the Archbasilica of Saint John Lateran in Rome from Patriarch Ignatius Joseph III Yonan, with Archbishop Denys Antoine Chahda and Archbishop Giorgio Demetrio Gallaro serving as co-consecrators.

On 21 October 2021, Al-Kalaban was appointed Apostolic Administrator of the Syriac Catholic Archeparchy of Homs, a position he held until 3 March 2023.
