= Archeparchy of Homs =

Archeparchy of Homs may refer to:

- Melkite Greek Catholic Archeparchy of Homs
- Syrian Catholic Archeparchy of Homs
