= Monastery of Saint Moses the Abyssinian =

Former Syriac Orthodox and current Syriac Catholic monastery in Syria

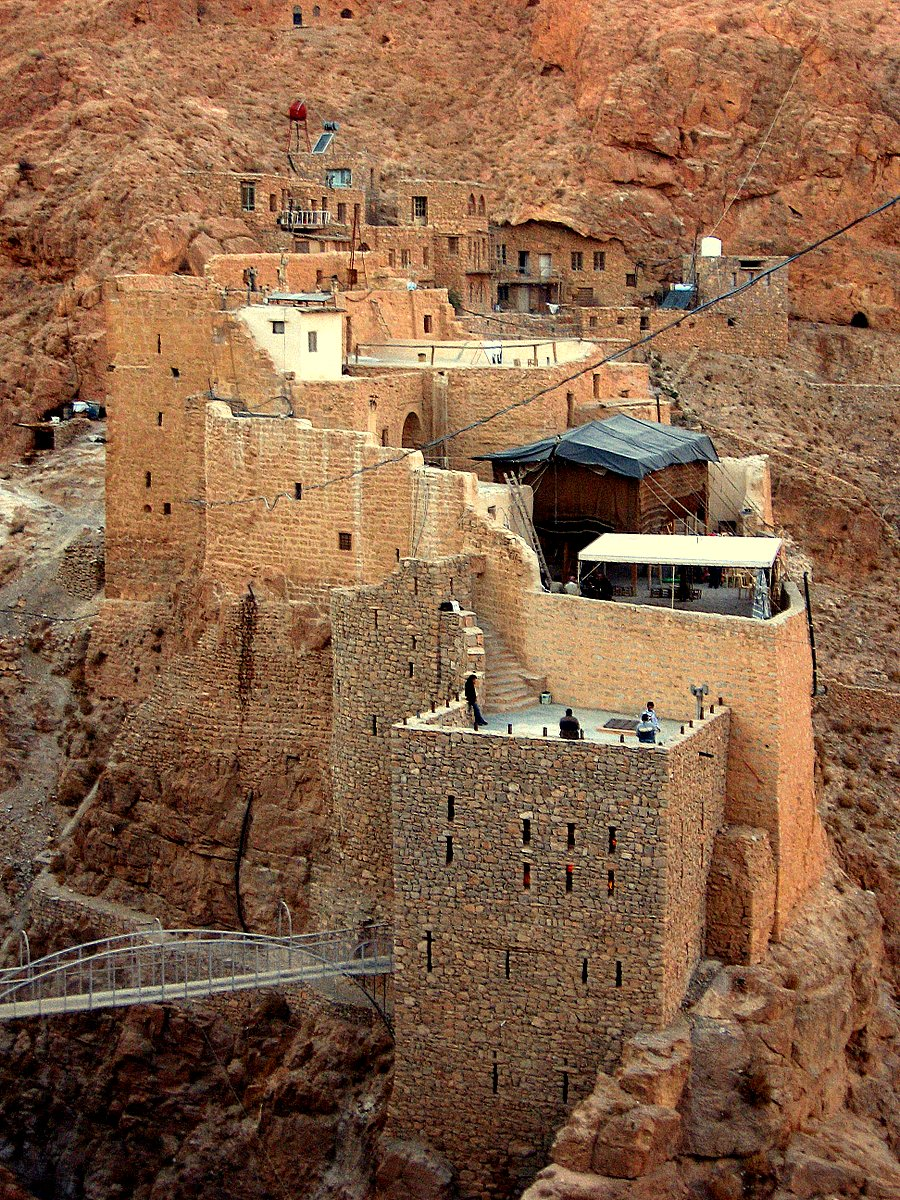

- Location within Syria
- Interactive map of Monastery of Saint Moses the Abyssinian

Monastery information
- Other name: Deir Mar Musa al-Habashi
- Order: Al-Khalil Monastic Community of Deir Mar Musa al-Habashi
- Established: 6th century
- Dedication: Saint Moses the Abyssinian
- Diocese: Syriac Catholic Church

Site
- Location: Nabk, Syria
- Coordinates: 34°1′18″N 36°50′32″E
- Public access: Yes

The Monastery of Saint Moses the Abyssinian (Syriac: ܕܝܪܐ ܕܡܪܝ ܡܘܫܐ ܟܘܫܝܐ, romanized: Dayrā d-Mār Mūše Kūšāyā; Arabic: دير مار موسى الحبشي, romanized: Dayr Mār Mūsá al-Ḥabashī), named after Moses the Black, is a monastic community of the Syriac Catholic Church located near the town of Nabk, Syria, approximately 80 km (50 mi) north of Damascus, on the eastern slopes of the Anti-Lebanon Mountains. The main church of the monastic compound hosts precious frescoes dating to the 11th and 12th centuries.

== Name ==
The monastery is dedicated to Moses the Black, an Egyptian thief-turned-monk and Desert Father. Some inscriptions and manuscripts, however, refer to this Moses as the prophet Moses, with the earliest references to Moses the Black dating from the 17th century. It is possible that the association with the desert father arose with the arrival of several Abyssinian monks in the 15th century.

== History ==
The monastery is situated atop a steep, rocky promontory that extends from a deep gorge nestled between two cliffs in the elevated area south of Nabk. The earliest historical reference is by John Chrysostom in a 6th-century manuscript, describing a "convent of Mushe, on the hill called 'the Great Head,' east of Natpha, in the province of Damascus." Subsequent history is preserved in inscriptions found within the monastery itself. It served as the seat of a bishopric until the end of the 14th century, when it was relocated to the diocese of Hama and Mardin, and later to Jerusalem and Damascus.

An ancient building, stone circles, lines, and tombs were recently discovered near the monastery in 2009 by archaeologist Robert Mason of the Royal Ontario Museum. Mason suggested that the ruins may date back 10,000 years and were likely constructed in the Neolithic period (such as the Heavy Neolithic Qaraoun culture of the Anti-Lebanon).

The lack of evidence for a farming community before the 6th century suggests that the original structures for what is now the monastery were either state impositions or monastic/ecclesiastical foundations. The two oldest extant structures on the site were likely Roman watchtowers built to oversee the road from Palmyra to Damascus. The earliest manuscript and coinage attestations indicate that the monastery was likely founded in the sixth century, supported by the network of lavra in nearby rock-faces which seem to date from this period. The site was largely rebuilt in both the 11th and 16th centuries. Its 11th-12th century frescoes, dating from between 1058 and 1208, represent 'the only full program of mediaeval church decoration to have survived in greater Syria' and provide important evidence of the growth of the medieval Syrian school of painting.

The larger 'Roman' tower seems to have been reconstructed in the 12th century, with well-dressed, well-lain stonework and vaulting on the ground floor, suggesting the involvement of professional engineers and masons, likely in response to a series of earthquakes in 1138 and again in 1157. The tower also yields pottery almost exclusively from the 14th century, including a piece of Yuan-dynasty Longquan celadon stoneware from China.

In 1838, the place, named Deir Mar Musa, was noted as having a Syriac population. The monastery was abandoned some time in the 19th century after intermittent activity from the 15th century onwards. In 1981, all but one room in the upper terrace had collapsed, but the chapel was still intact, with its walls adorned with peeling, painted stucco, though the roof and ciborium had been burned for as firewood. An orientalist Jesuit priest, Paolo Dall'Oglio, restored the community in 1992 with deacon Jacques Mourad (now Archbishop of Homs) under the Syriac Catholic Church; the community was a double monastic community (men and women, which is normally contrary to the XX canon of the Second Council of Nicaea), named "Al-Khalil Monastic Community of Deir Mar Musa al-Habashi", devoted to four tasks: prayer, work, hospitality and dialogue.

== Gallery ==
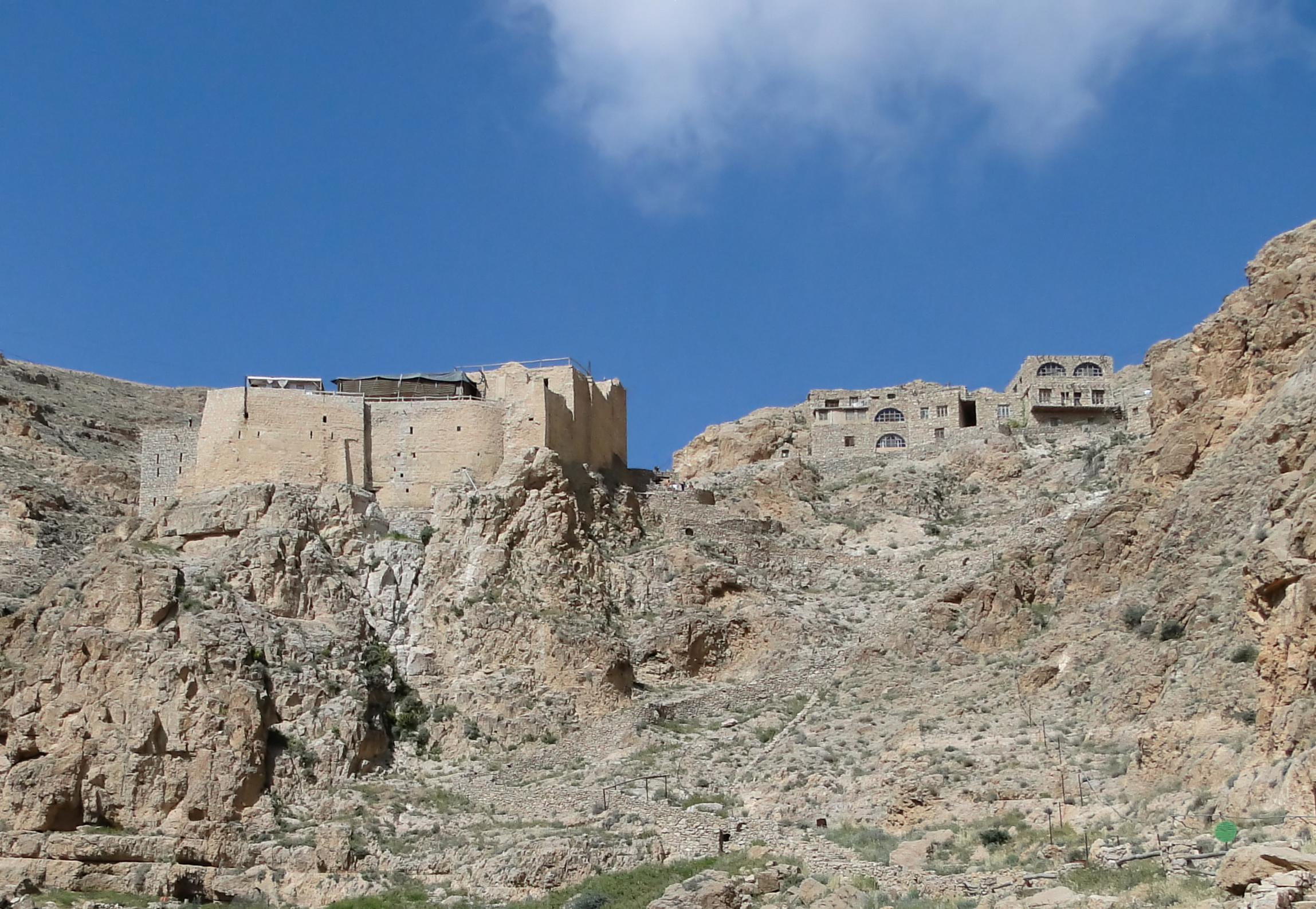
View of the monastery

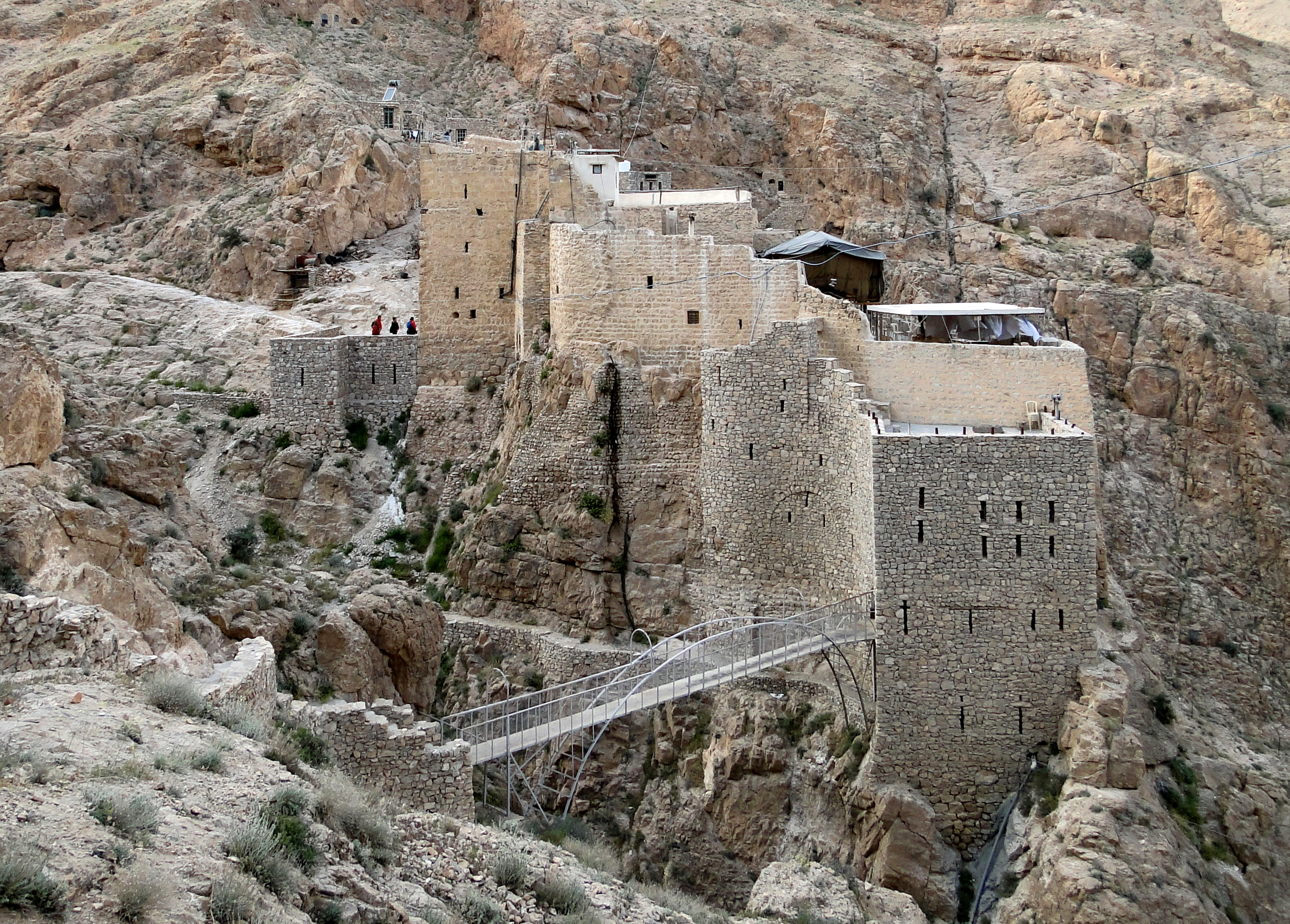
View of the oldest building of the monastery

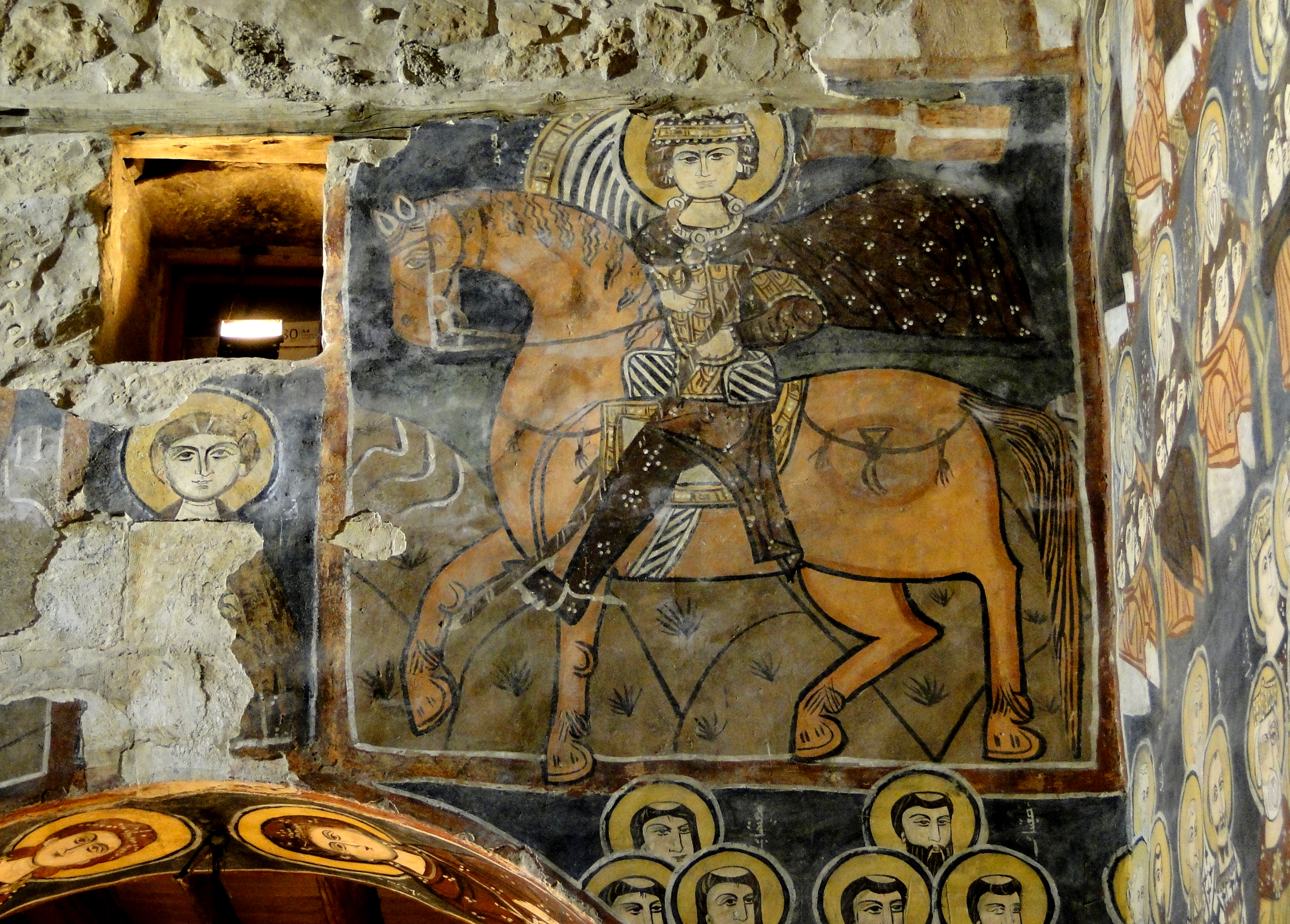
Fresco depicting Saint Bacchus at the monastery

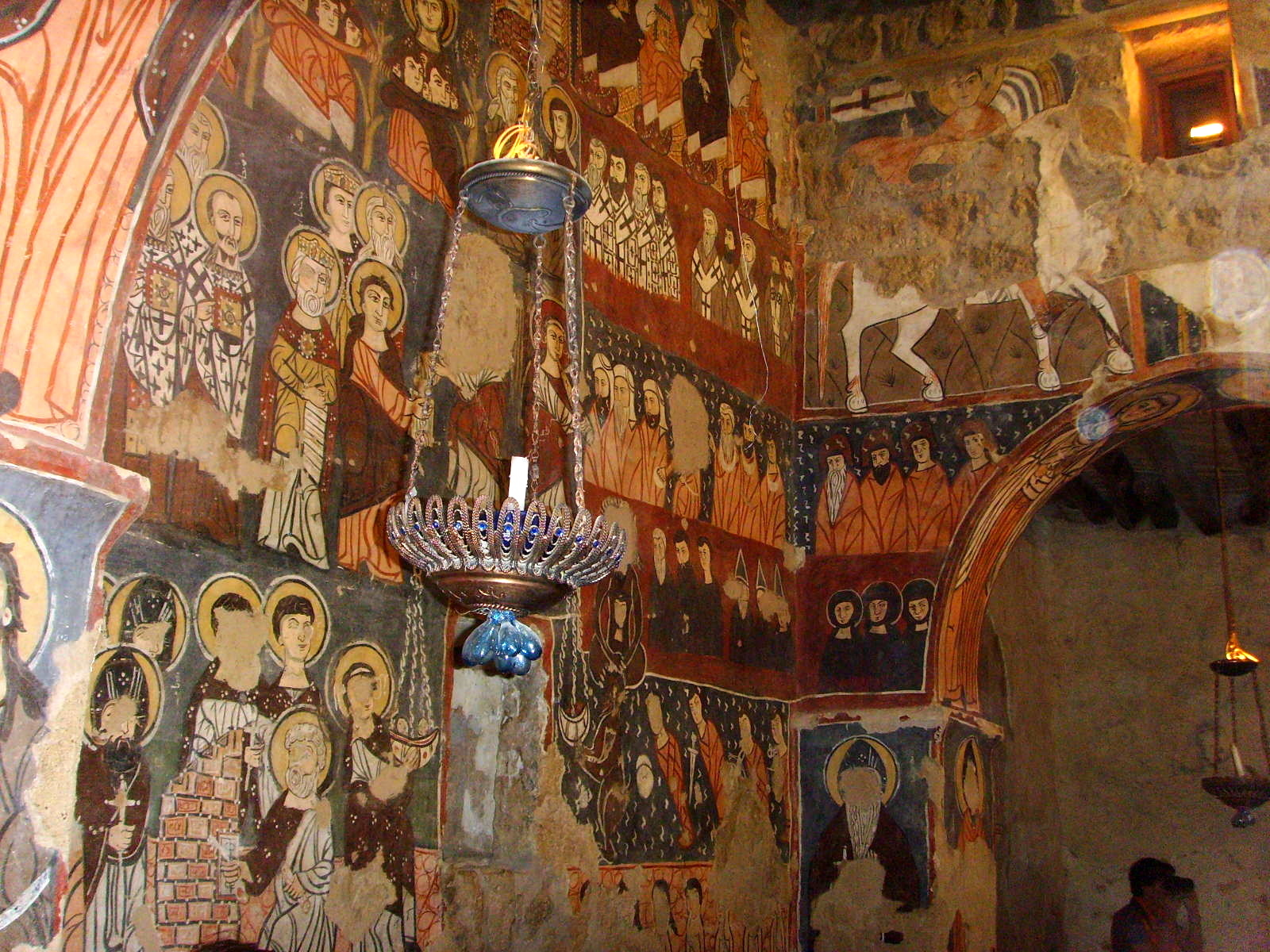
Restored fresco inside the church

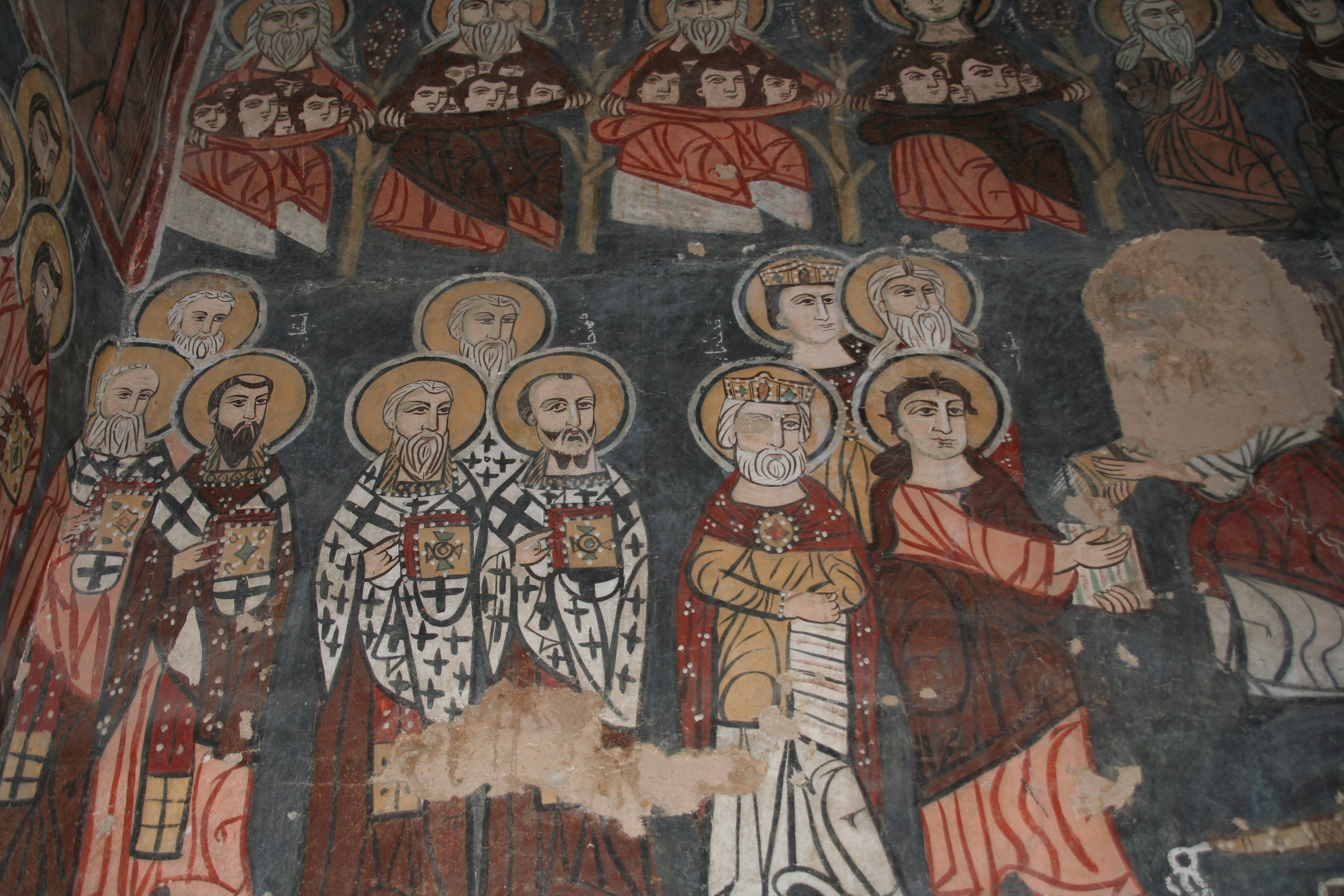
Detail of a fresco representing the Last Judgement, the elect are led by the first martyrs Stephen and James

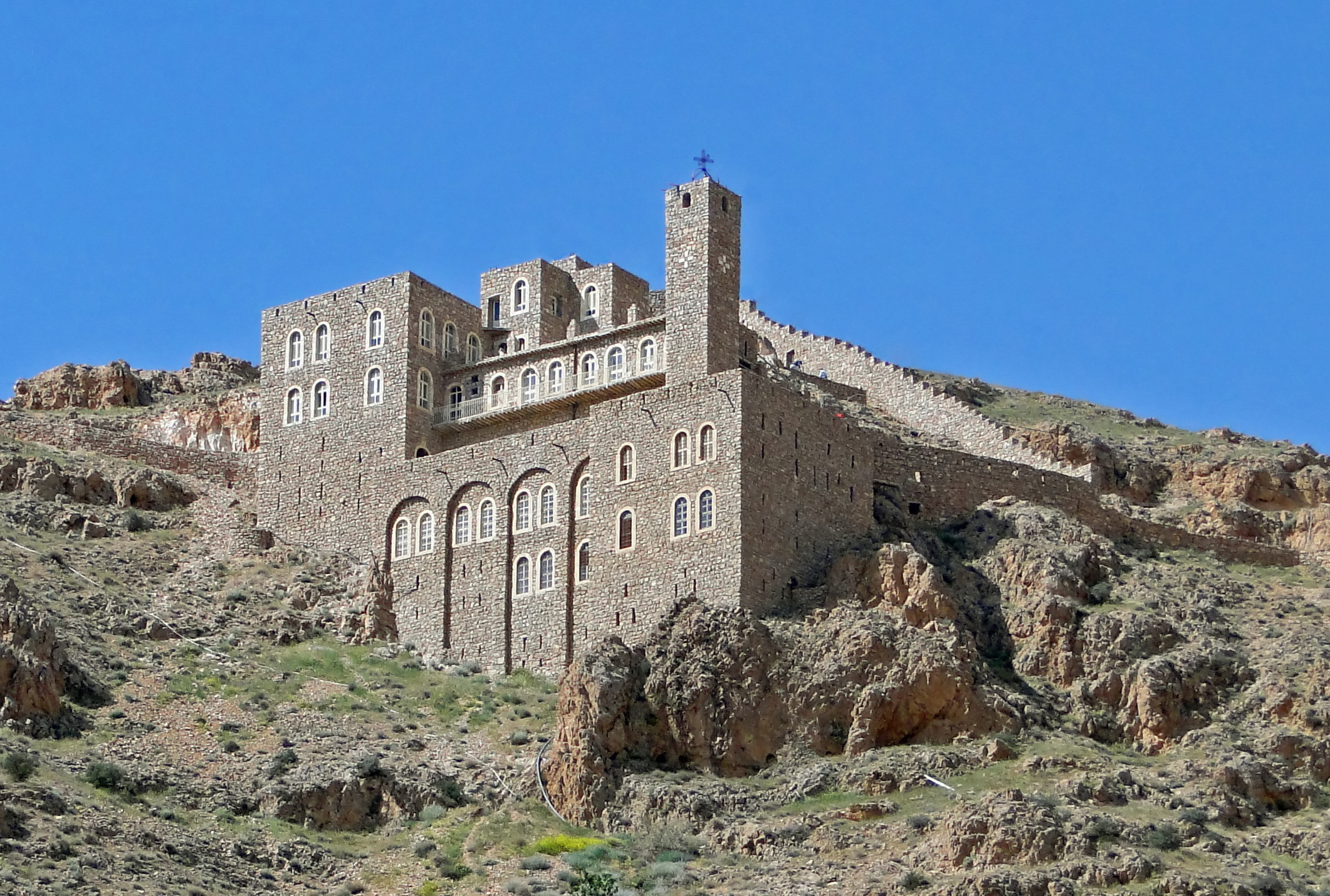
Building reconstructed in 1991

== See also ==
- Monastery of St. James the Mutilated
- Mor Hananyo Monastery
- Syriac Catholic Eparchy of Our Lady of Deliverance in the United States

== Bibliography ==
- Robinson, E.; Smith, E. (1841). Biblical Researches in Palestine, Mount Sinai and Arabia Petraea: A Journal of Travels in the year 1838. Vol. 3. Boston: Crocker & Brewster.
- Dodd, E. Cruikshank (2011). Brock, Sebastian P.; Butts, Aaron Michael; Kiraz, George A.; Rompay, Lucas Van (eds.). Gorgias Encyclopedic Dictionary of the Syriac Heritage. Gorgias Press, LLC. ISBN 978-1-59333-714-8.
