= Frans van der Lugt =

Dutch Jesuit (1938–2014)

The Reverend Frans van der Lugt SJ

Orders
- Ordination: 29 May 1971

Personal details
- Born: Franciscus Joseph Wilhelmus van der Lugt; 10 April 1938 The Hague, Netherlands
- Died: 7 April 2014 (aged 75) Homs, Syria
- Denomination: Roman Catholicism
- Education: University of Lyon

Franciscus Joseph Wilhelmus van der Lugt, SJ, known as Frans van der Lugt or Pater Frans (10 April 1938 – 7 April 2014), was a Jesuit priest from the Netherlands who established a community centre and farm near the city of Homs, Syria, where he worked for the betterment of people with disabilities and for harmony among Christian and Muslim people.

His cause for canonization has been on hold since 2022 after discovery of his controversial comments minimizing clerical sex abuse.

== Biography ==
Van der Lugt was born into a banker's family and grew up in Amsterdam. His father was Godefridus Wilhelmus Antonius van der Lugt, president of the Nederlandsche Landbouwbank. His brother Godfried van der Lugt became a top executive with the Postbank and later the ING Group. Van der Lugt studied as a psychotherapist but left the Netherlands for the Middle East in the 1960s, where he joined the Jesuits and spent two years in Lebanon where he studied Arabic. In 1966 he went to Syria, where he lived for nearly fifty years.

Van der Lugt started a community center and farm in 1980, the Al-Ard Center, just outside the city of Homs. The farm had vineyards and gardens in which much of the work was done by people with disabilities, providing an unprecedented resource in a society in which such people are usually hidden from view. In reconciling people from different religious backgrounds, van der Lugt emphasised the humanity of people as the common ground, rather than stressing commonality in the theologies of different faiths. He saw connection with the earth as part of a common bond. To this end, he conducted annual eight-day treks across the mountains for teenagers of all faiths.

Christians and Muslims are going through a difficult and painful time and we are faced with many problems. The greatest of these is hunger. People have nothing to eat. There is nothing more painful than watching mothers searching for food for children in the streets...I will not accept that we die of hunger. I do not accept that we drown in a sea of hunger, letting the waves of death drag us under. We love life, we want to live. And we do not want to sink in a sea of pain and suffering.

— Pater Frans, in a video made January 2014. Translated from Arabic.

After the siege of Homs, van der Lugt cared for the sick and the hungry. He gained international exposure at the beginning of 2014 when he made a number of YouTube videos, asking the international community for help for the citizens of the besieged city. He refused to leave, despite the dangerous situation. In February, The Economist reported that he was probably the last European in the city and stayed because he was "the shepherd of [his] flock": He declined being evacuated during a UN operation in 2014 that saved 1400 people from the besieged city.

Van der Lugt was known for helping Christians and Muslims alike; the Al-Ard Center aimed to foster dialog between people of different faiths. In an interview in 2012, he explained how they held a church service after a bombardment; by this time, he said, all the Catholics had left, leaving only Orthodox Christians and Muslims to celebrate Palm Sunday in his church. The imam preached at the service. Van der Lugt later said that the sermon had removed from him any residual tendencies to place emphasis on dogma.

=== Death and reactions ===
He was shot around 09:30 am on Monday, 7 April 2014, aged 75. He was the second foreign-born Jesuit in that area to fall victim to the Syrian civil war: Paolo Dall'Oglio was kidnapped in 2013. A Vatican spokesperson "expressed 'great pain' over his death", according to the BBC, and the Dutch foreign minister Frans Timmermans called his murder "cowardly".

Pope Francis appealed to end violence in Syria upon van der Lugt's death, saying:

Last Monday in Homs, Syria, the Rev. Fr. Frans van der Lugt was assassinated, a Dutch Jesuit brother of mine, 75 years old, who arrived in Syria about 50 years ago; he always did good to all, with gratitude and love, and therefore he was loved and respected by Christians and Muslims. His brutal murder has filled me with deep pain and it made me think of a lot of people still suffering and dying in that tormented country, my beloved Syria, already too long in the throes of a bloody conflict, which continues to reap death and destruction. I also think of the many people abducted, both Christians and Muslims, in Syria and in other countries as well, among which are bishops and priests.

== Possible sainthood ==
Following van der Lugt's death, there was enthusiasm that he could be beatified in the Catholic Church as a martyr for the Christian faith. The superior general of the Jesuits and the Bishop of Aleppo were reportedly in support of beginning the process. However, it was reported in 2022 that van der Lugt had previously made comments to tourists minimizing the Catholic clerical sex abuse crisis, and that the discovery of said comments had derailed the canonization efforts.

== Bibliography ==
- (in Dutch) : Paul Begheyn sj (red.)Frans van der Lugt sj 1938–2014 – Bruggenbouwer en martelaar in Syrië, editor Valkhof Pers, Nijmegen, October 2015, ISBN 9789056254490
