= Théophile Philippe Barakat =

Syrian Syriac Catholic hierarch (1952–2020)

- Archeparch of Homs
- Native name: فيليب بركات
- Church: Syriac Catholic Church
- Archdiocese: Archeparchy of Homs
- In office: 15 April 2016 – 13 June 2020
- Predecessor: Théophile Georges Kassab
- Successor: Julian Yacoub Mourad

Orders
- Ordination: 15 August 1976 by Ignatius Antony II Hayyek
- Consecration: 7 May 2016 by Ignatius Joseph III Yonan

Personal details
- Born: 1 July 1952 Zaidal, Homs Governorate, Syrian Republic
- Died: 13 June 2020 (aged 67)

Théophile Phillippe Barakat (1 July 1952 – 13 June 2020) was a Syriac Catholic archeparch.

Barakat was born in Syria and was ordained to the priesthood in 1976. He was the Syriac Catholic archeparch of the Syriac Catholic Archeparchy of Homs in 2016.

He died on 13 June 2020.
