= Théophile Georges Kassab =

- Archeparch of Homs
- Native name: تيوفيل جورج كساب
- Church: Syriac Catholic Church
- Archdiocese: Archeparchy of Homs
- In office: 8 May 1999 – 22 October 2013
- Predecessor: Ignatius Moses I Daoud
- Successor: Théophile Philippe Barakat

Orders
- Ordination: 6 October 1974
- Consecration: 3 March 2000 by Ignatius Moses I Daoud

Personal details
- Born: 5 June 1945 Zaidal, Mandatory Syrian Republic, French Empire
- Died: 22 October 2013 (aged 68) Ajaltoun, Mount Lebanon Governorate, Lebanon

Théophile Georges Kassab (5 June 1945 − 22 October 2013) was a Syrian Syriac Catholic archbishop.

Ordained to the priesthood in 1974, Kassab was elected archbishop of the Syriac Metropolitan Archeparchy of Homs, Syria in May 1999, before being ordained archbishop of the title in March 2000.

He died in October 2013, while receiving treatment at the Maronite Saint Georges Hospital in Ajaltoun, Lebanon.
