= Llanelian =

Llanelian may refer to:

- Llanelian Road, home field for Colwyn Bay F.C., Wales
- Llanelian-yn-Rhos, a settlement near the village of Betws yn Rhos, Conwy County Borough, Wales
- Saint Elian (Wales), saint who founded a church in North Wales around the year 450

== See also ==
- Llaneilian, a village in Anglesey.
