= Popoli (magazine) =

Italian magazine

- Categories: Roman Catholicism
- Frequency: Monthly
- Founded: 1915; 110 years ago
- Country: Italy
- Based in: Milan
- Language: Italian
- Website: www.popoli.info

Popoli is an Italian Jesuit magazine. Founded in 1915, the magazine is published by the San Fedele Cultural Foundation of Milan.

== History ==
=== Le Missioni della Compagnia di Gesù (The Missions of the Society of Jesus) ===
In the winter of 1914, Giuseppe Petazzi, a Jesuit priest, began preparations for the publication of a fortnightly journal, named Le Missioni della Compagnia di Gesù, publishing the first issue in January 1915. The magazine aimed at promoting the work of the missions, with a specific reference to members of the Society of Jesus (the Jesuits) in Italy. The publication featured images and began to publish every month in 1943.

In 1954, the magazine changed its format from "note-book" to the larger sized format of the present publication. In 1970, the magazine was renamed Popoli e Missioni (Peoples and Missions) with the publisher's new association with the Italian headquarters of Pontifical Mission Societies. At this time, the publication introduced color photographs to become more international in its focus.

=== Popoli ===
In 1987, the magazine entered its third iteration with the adoption of the new title Popoli and the end of its cooperation with the Pontifical Mission Societies. In 1993, the first lay correspondent joined the editing team.

The magazine paid increasingly more attention to the imbalances between the global North and the South, following in the footsteps of Giuseppe Bellucci (editor-in-chief from 1976), who would ask "are we heading for a new type of exploitation, or a fairer world?". Increasingly, Popoli took on the role of combining information and news with its existing mission role. Father Bellucci left the magazine in 1998 following 22 years of service, and after a brief tenure of Father Giustino Béthaz's as editor-in-chief, Father Bartolomeo Sorge, former editor of both Civiltà Cattolica and Aggiornamenti Sociali, took the lead in 1999. In 2006, Stefano Femminis became editor-in-chief, the first layman to lead a Jesuit magazine in Italy.

Popoli has spent the last several years paying increased attention to the dynamics of immigration in Italy and the transformation of a multi-ethnic society. Since 2010, the magazine has been available online, with a wider range of contents and articles than its paper equivalent. One year later, Popoli became the first Catholic magazine in Italy to develop an iPad app.

== Aims ==
According to Father Bellucci, the magazine aims to:

- Emphasize the cultural and religious values of people in the world. To take the reader, with the aid of the articles and the photos, onto a journey of discovery of one's neighbor.
- Pay special attention to embedding the Gospel into the world's varied cultural areas.
- Stress the ecumenical side of the publication's mission, including dialogue between the Catholic Church and other religious faiths.

== In-house Correspondents ==
- Maurizio Ambrosini – Sociologist
- Stefano Bittasi S.I. – Jesuit and Bible Scholar
- Anna Casella – Anthropologist
- Giacomo Poretti – Comedian
- Paolo Dall'Oglio S.I. – Syria-based Jesuit
- Silvano Fausti S.I. – Jesuit and Bible Scholar
- Thomas J. Reese S.I. – Jesuit and Journalist (Washington)
- Fabrizio Valletti S.I. – Jesuit (Scampia, Naples)
