= Matthew Nakkar =

Syriac Catholic bishop (1795 - 1868)

Matthew Gregory Nakkar (1795 – 22 March 1868) was a Bishop of the Miaphysite Syriac Orthodox Church, who converted to Eastern Catholicism and became a bishop of the Syriac Catholic Church.

== Biography ==
Matthew Nakkar was born in 1795 in a family in which from generation to generation for 600 years monopolized the Jacobite see of Mosul. At age 25, he was ordained a priest and served under his uncle, the Metropolitan, and in 1826 succeeded him as Metropolitan. Matthew Nakkar since his childhood brought up to hate the Catholics, and as subsequently confessed in his "Memoirs" tirelessly preached against Catholic teaching and doing everything possible to stop the Catholics to spread their faith. However, despite the opposition of the Catholic Church and not of the Ottoman Empire, the number willing to Catholicism is constantly growing. Between 1825 and 1830 almost all Jacobites of Damascus and southern Lebanon, including Bishop James al-Haliani, joined to Catholic Church.

== Conversion to Catholicism ==
The patriarch of the Syriac Orthodox Church sent Matthew Nakkar to Damascus to be coped with the problems. His task was to seize by the Turkish authorities of Bishop James al-Haliani, however, Matthew was unable to catch him, because al-Haliani managed to hide in the mountains near the Lebanese Maronites. All that managed to Saint Matthew - it recovered to jail 25 people to Catholicism, after which he went to Jerusalem to meet the Passover. Matthew Nakkar hoping to witness the descent of the Holy Fire - a miracle, which was one of the major arguments against Catholicism. The contemplation of this miracle, as expected in March, was to give him the strength and determination in the fight against Catholics.

On Holy Saturday of 1832 Nakkar with his deacon came to the Church of the Holy Sepulchre. While they mingled with the crowd who wanted to light their own candles from the miraculous fire, Matthew Nakkar heard that the fire does not burn any hands or face, or even hair. As soon as he had lit his candle, he held it to his deacon's beard which immediately broke out in flames. Matthew accused his deacon due to lack of faith, but the incident sowed doubt in his mind that had not had before.

Soon after he went to Aleppo, which became the seat of the Patriarch of the Syriac Catholic Church. Local Catholics staged a lavish reception to Matthew Nakkar, however, failed to appease his persecutor, they save only that started a month of Ramadan and the Turks, as Muslims, were not set up to organize the hunt in the holy month. Metropolitan of Mosul Matthew Nakkar was forced to stay in the city for a month. Thanks to the error of his servant, he stopped at the founding fathers of the Lazarists, whose monastery servant took over the hotel. Since the monks warmly received Matthew, he decided to stay in the monastery, the decision also influenced by his curiosity and desire to debate with Catholics who he considered "heretics." The discussions mainly focused on provisions of Chalcedon and the question about the number of natures in Christ. Soon it became clear to Matthew Nakkar that the Catholics arguments are much more difficult to refute than he thought before. A special impression of was made on him from evidence in the writings of Saint Ephrem the Syrian, one of the most revered Jacobite saints. Matthew Nakkar asked the monks permission to use their library to prepare arguments. The study of the Fathers of the Church in the monastery library, as well as discussions with the monks and the incident of the Holy Fire, led to his admission into the Catholic Church on November 27, 1832. He was admitted to the Syriac Catholic Church by Patriarch Ignatius Peter VII Jarweh.

== Catholic missionary activity among Syriac Orthodox Christians ==
From Aleppo Matthew went directly to Mardin - the main stronghold of Jacobites. Here, as a result of his preaching of Catholicism converted 54 people. On hearing this, the patriarch of the Syriac Orthodox Church denounced him to the Turkish authorities, accusing Matthew in getting to the Pope of gold, with which he allegedly persuaded Jacobites to the adoption of Catholicism and refusing to obey the Sultan. By order of the Governor Nakkar was captured and imprisoned, and later he was sent to the Jacobite Monastery, where he held two weeks in an empty tank, starved and beaten regularly, claiming to renounce Catholicism and curse the Council of Chalcedon. Two weeks later, the exhausted Matthew was taken to a hut outside the monastery, hoping that he would die there. But the next morning heard the groans of Bishop passing by the daughter of the leader of local Kurds, who told his servants to break down the door and moved to his home dying. Having recovered his freedom, Matthew returned to his preaching, through which the end of the year joined to the Catholic Church the Jacobite Metropolitan of Mardin. In 1835 he became bishop in the newly formed Diocese of Nabq and Cariati. In this position he remained for 33 years until his death. During this time his diocese joined tens of thousands of Jacobites, together with them, he experienced fellow Maronite war and related anti-Christian pogroms.

== Death ==
Matthew Nakkar died on 22 March 1868 and his grave is in the Syro-Catholic Patriarchal Monastery in Sharfeh, on the territory of Lebanon.
