= Arethusa (see) =

Episcopal see in Roman Syria

Arethusa (or Aretusa) was a city in the Roman province of Syria, near Apameia. The modern Arabic name of the city is Al-Rastan.

== Ecclesiastical history ==
Arethusa's episcopal list (325–680) is given in Gams (p. 436). It was a Latin see for a brief period during the Crusades (1099–1100). According to the hagiography of its Bishop Marcus of Arethusa, under the Roman Emperor Flavius Julius Constantius (337–361), Marcus destroyed a heathen temple, which under Emperor Julian, he was ordered to rebuild. To avoid this, he fled from the city, but eventually returned to save the Christian people from paying the penalty in his stead, and underwent very cruel treatment at the hands of the pagan mob (Sozomen, Historia Ecclesiastica, x, 10) in 362. He was later canonized.

Marcus is said to have been the author of the Creed of Sirmium (351) and is counted by Tillemont as an Arian in belief and in factious spirit. He was struck from the Roman Martyrology for years, but research by the Bollandists vindicated him and restored his name to the rolls. The Roman Martyrology commemorates him on 29 March, with the description: "Saint Mark, Bishop of Arethusa in Syria, who in the time of the Arian controversy held firm to the orthodox faith and was severely maltreated under Julian the Apostate. Saint Gregory of Nazianzus lauds him as an outstanding and saintly old man." The Eastern Orthodox Church celebrates him on 20 March.

=== Titular see ===
Arethusa is now a titular episcopal see in both the Roman Rite and the West Syriac Rite.
