= Monastery of St. Elian =

Christian monastery in central Syria

- Deir Mar Elian al-Sheikh
- Location within Syria

Monastery information
- Other name: Mar Elian
- Order: Syriac Catholic
- Established: 5th century
- Disestablished: 21 August 2015
- Dedication: St. Julian (Mar Elian)

People
- Abbot: Jacques Mourad

Site
- Location: Al-Qaryatayn, Homs, Syria
- Coordinates: 34°14′10″N 37°13′30″E
- Visible remains: ?

The Monastery of St. Elian is a Syriac Catholic monastery near the town of Al-Qaryatayn, along a trade route between the two major cities of Palmyra and Damascus in the Homs Governorate of central Syria. It was destroyed on 21 August 2015 by members of the Islamic State of Iraq and the Levant (ISIL or ISIS), whose acts of terror in the Syrian Civil War include widespread vandalism and violence against non-Salafists and historical heritage. St. Elian Monastery housed a 5th-century tomb and served as a major pilgrimage site, particularly to those seeking a cure for bodily ailments. Parts of the monastery, including the foundations, were 1,500 years old.

== Destruction by ISIL ==
ISIL released images showing the demolition of the monastery. The group had captured the area earlier in August. The group also imprisoned a number of Christian civilians. The monastery's superior, Jacques Mourad, was abducted by ISIL in May 2015 and escaped after 5 months of captivity. Threatened with execution, he escaped from the ISIL-held territory. The area around the monastery was recaptured by the Syrian Arab Army from ISIS in April 2016. The bones and broken sarcophagus of Mar Elian were rediscovered and recovered in the ruins of the site at that time.

== Art and architecture ==
The Monastery of St. Elian was constructed using stone decorated with circular patterns. It notably featured graffiti left behind by worshippers from other faiths, including Stars of David and Arabic script. The building also bore an inscription stating the monastery was under the protection of a local Muslim ruler, Emir Sayfudullah, reflecting the peaceful coexistence of Muslims and Christians living in region around the fifteenth century.

The monastery was renovated extensively in the early 2000s, replacing the facade and restoring the recently excavated lower level.

Through various excavation efforts throughout the 21st century, the original structure is believed to have been a basic one, consisting of mud and brick walls with simple post and lintel entrances. Archeologists have also unearthed a large plastered iconostasis and a stone sarcophagus at the site, which some believe contained the bones of Mar Elian himself.

== The rebirth of the monastery ==
Since 2022, it has been restored through extensive efforts. The community led by Father Jacques Mourad rebuilt the monastery, including the crypt and church, and returned the relics of Mar Elian.

== List of bishops and abbots ==
Abouna Jacques Mourad (2000–2015)
Mor Julius Zmarya (1707–1735?)
Mor Cyril Jirjis Fattal (1727–1756) and bishop of Homs
