= Paolo Dall'Oglio =

Italian Jesuit priest and peace activist

The Reverend Fr Paolo Dall'Oglio SJ
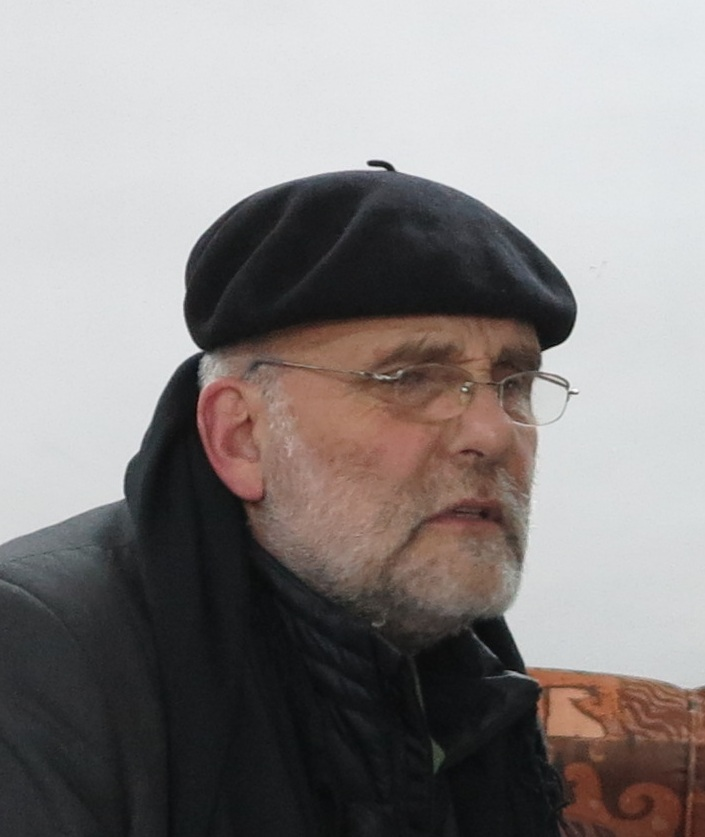
- Paolo Dall'Oglio, December 2012 in Iraq

Personal life
- Born: 17 November 1954 Rome, Italy
- Died: 29 July 2013 (disappeared, presumed dead)
- Education: Naples Eastern University "L'Orientale"; Pontifical Gregorian University

Religious life
- Religion: Christianity
- Denomination: Syriac Catholic Church
- Order: Society of Jesus
- Ordination: 1984

Senior posting
- Post: Superior of The al-Khalil monastic Community of Deir Mar Musa al-Habashi
- Period in office: 1992–2013

Paolo Dall'Oglio (born 17 November 1954) is an Italian Jesuit priest and peace activist. He was exiled from Syria by the government in 2012 for meeting with members of the opposition and criticizing the alleged actions of the Syrian government during the Syrian civil war. He was kidnapped by Islamic State of Iraq and the Levant on 29 July 2013.

Before his kidnapping, he had served for three decades at the Deir Mar Musa Al-Abashi, a 6th-century monastery 80 kilometres (50 mi) north of Damascus. He has been credited with the reconstruction of the Mar Musa complex and its reinvention as a centre of interfaith dialogue.

In February 2019, news emerged that he may still be alive inside Deir ez-Zor Governorate, Syria.

== Biography ==
In 1975, Paolo Dall'Oglio joined the Jesuit order. He spent his novitiate in Italy before starting university studies of Arabic language and Islamic studies in Beirut, Lebanon, and Damascus, Syria.

In 1982, he explored the ruins of the old Syriac Monastery of St. Moses the Abyssinian (Deir Mar Musa) that can be traced back to the 6th century and had been abandoned since the 19th century.

Paolo Dall'Oglio - Interview in 2011 on the Syrian tradition of coexistence and the present scenario of confrontation ⇒ playlist

In 1984, Dall'Oglio was ordained priest in the Syriac Catholic rite. In the same year, he obtained a degree in Arabic language and Islamic studies from Naples Eastern University "L'Orientale" and in Catholic theology from the Pontifical Gregorian University.

In 1986, he obtained another master's degree in Missiology from the Pontifical Gregorian University.

In 1989, he obtained a PhD degree from the Pontifical Gregorian University. He wrote his doctoral dissertation on the topic "About Hope in Islam".

In 1992, with deacon Jacques Mourad, Paolo “officially” founded under the authority of the Syriac Catholic Church a double monastic community (men and women, which is normally contrary to the XX canon of the Second Council of Nicaea), named "the Al-Khalil Monastic Community of Deir Mar Moussa al-Habashi", devoted to four tasks: prayer (in Arabic salat), work (amal), hospitality (dayafa) and dialogue (hiwar), dedicated to Muslim-Christian dialogue.

In 2009, Dall'Oglio obtained the double honorary doctorate of the Université catholique de Louvain and the KU Leuven.

He contributed regularly to the magazine Popoli, the international magazine of the Italian Jesuits, established in 1915.

== Role in the Syrian civil war ==
In 2011, Dall'Oglio wrote an article pleading for a peaceful democratic transition in Syria, based on what he called "consensual democracy". He also met with opposition activists and participated in the funeral service for the 28-year-old Christian filmmaker Bassel Shehadeh, who had been murdered in Homs.

The Syrian government reacted sharply and issued an expulsion order. Dall'Oglio ignored the order for a couple of months and continued living in Syria. However, following the publication of an open letter to UN special envoy Kofi Annan in May 2012, he obeyed his bishop who urged him to leave the country. He left Syria on 12 June 2012 and joined in exile the newly established Deir Maryam al-Adhra of his community in Sulaymaniyah, Iraqi Kurdistan.

In December 2012, Dall'Oglio was awarded the Peace Prize of the Italian region of Lombardy that is dedicated to persons having done extraordinary work in the field of peacebuilding.

In late July 2013 Dall'Oglio entered rebel held territory in eastern Syria but was soon kidnapped by the militants of the Islamic State of Iraq and the Levant, while walking in Raqqa on 29 July. Opposition sources from Raqqa said that Paolo Dall'Oglio has been executed by the extremist group and his body thrown into a ground hole in the city of Raqqa, called “Al-Houta”. Dead Assad loyalist soldiers would have often been thrown into the same hole. The claims are not yet independently confirmed.

However, the Rewards for Justice Program offers $5 million for information on the ISIS network responsible for kidnapping Christian clerics: Maher Mahfouz, Michael Kayyal, Yohanna Ibrahim, Boulos Yazigi, and Paolo Dall’Oglio.

In 2023, Pope Francis wrote the preface for Il mio testamento, a collection of previously unpublished spiritual conferences that Dall'Oglio gave to his monastic community soon before his expulsion from Syria.

== Selected bibliography ==
- (in Italian) Speranza nell'Islam: Interpretazione della prospettiva escatologica di Corano XVIII, 365 pp., Marietti, Milano 1991, ISBN 978-8-8211-7461-2
- (in French) Amoureux de l'islam, croyant en Jésus, in cooperation with Églantine Gabaix-Hialé, preface by Régis Debray, 190 pp., Les Editions de l'Atelier, Paris 2009, ISBN 978-2-7082-4044-5
- (in Italian) La sete di Ismaele. Siria, diario monastico islamo-cristiano, Gabrielli Editori, Verona 2011, ISBN 978-8-8609-9141-6
- (in French) La démocratie consensuelle, pour l’unité nationale, 27 July 2011, published on the official website of the monastery of Mar Musa
- (in French) La rage et la lumière, in cooperation with Églantine Gabaix-Hialé, Les Editions de l'Atelier, Paris, May 2013
- (in Italian) Il mio testamento, the Ambrosian Center, 2023, ISBN 978-8-8689-4614-2

== See also ==
- Frans van der Lugt
