= Elian's Dublin =

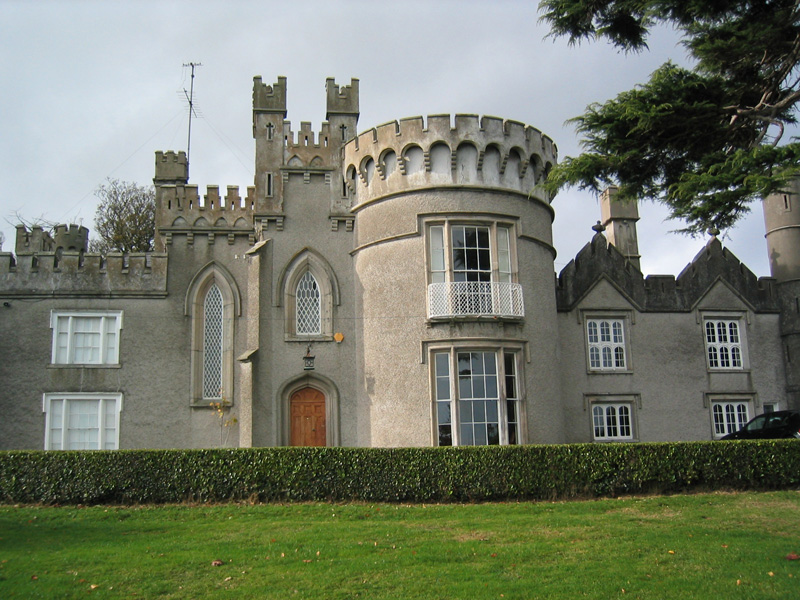

Location
- Ballyman Road; Bray, County Wicklow; Ireland
- Coordinates: 53.2076°N 6.1379°W

Information
- School type: Spanish international school, High school
- Founded: 1985
- Closed: 2008?
- Staff: 30-40
- Gender: Mixed
- Age range: 13-18
- Enrollment: 150-300

Elian's Dublin was a private Spanish international school in Bray, County Wicklow, Ireland, 18 kilometres (11 mi) from the centre of Dublin. The Spanish government recognised it as a Centro Privado Español en el Extranjero, and it offered primary through bachillerato (high school) classes. A part of the IALE Elian's education group, it was located in Jubilee Hall, a castle in Bray.
