= Syriac Catholic Archeparchy of Homs =

Eastern Catholic archeparchy in Syria

Coordinates: 34.7333°N 36.7167°E

Archeparchy of Homs (-Hama-Nabk) Archidioecesis Hemesena Syrorum (-Epiphaniensis-Nabikensis)
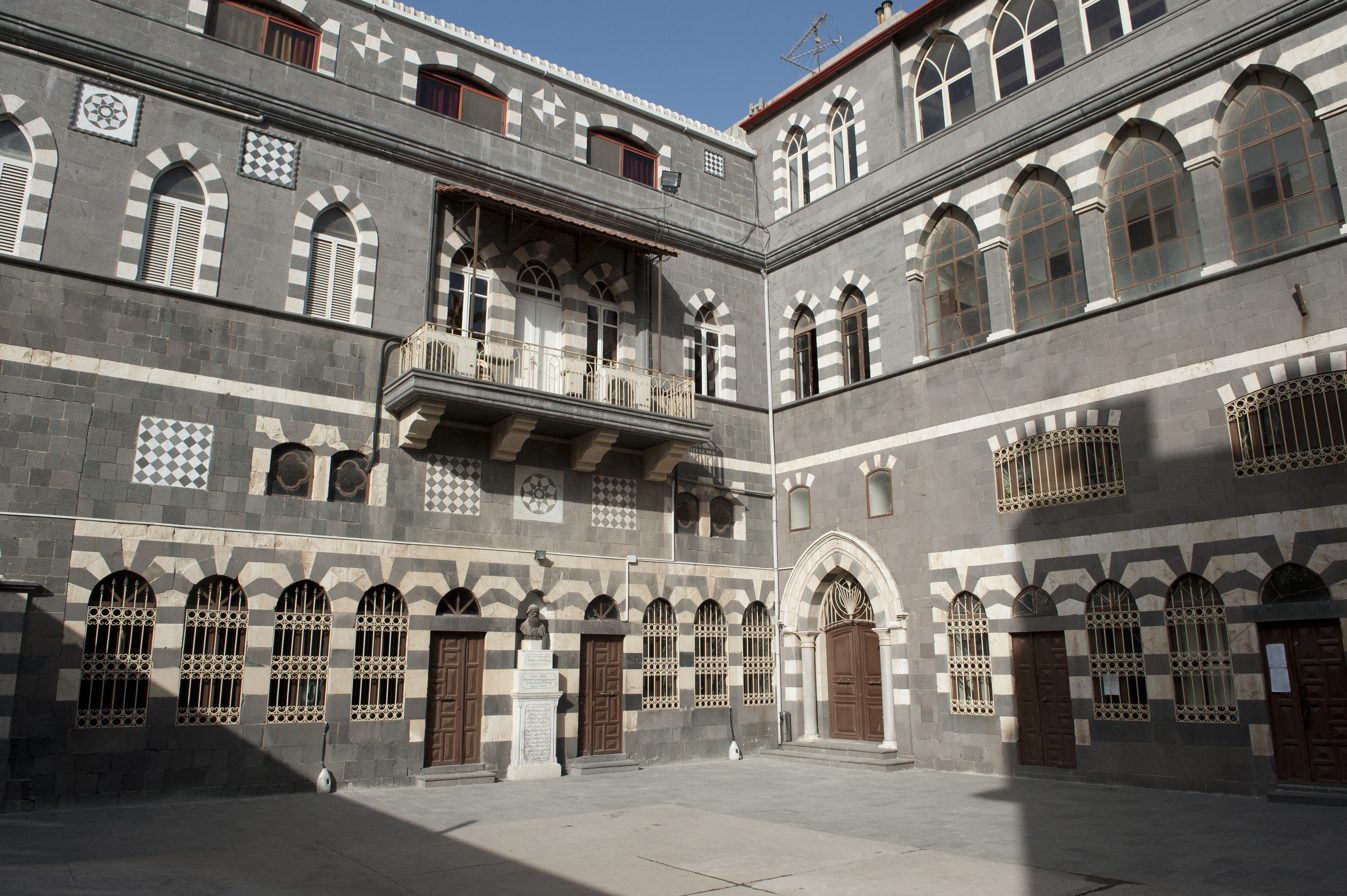
- Holy Spirit Cathedral, Homs

Location
- Country: Syria

Statistics
- Population: (as of 2023); 10,500
- Parishes: 15

Information
- Denomination: Catholic Church
- Sui iuris church: Syriac Catholic Church
- Rite: West Syriac Rite
- Established: 1678
- Cathedral: Syriac Catholic Holy Spirit Cathedral
- Secular priests: 20

Current leadership
- Pope: Leo XIV
- Patriarch: Ignatius Joseph III Younan
- Archeparch: Julian Yacoub Mourad

The Syriac Catholic Archeparchy of Homs (-Hama-Nabk) (informally Homs of the Syriacs) is a nominally metropolitan archeparchy (Eastern Catholic archdiocese) of the Syriac Catholic Church sui iuris (Antiochian Rite in Syriac language) in Syria. It has no suffragans. The seat of the archeparchy is the Holy Ghost Cathedral in Homs, Syria.

Since March 2023, it is headed by Archbishop Julian Yacoub Mourad (born Jacques Mourad).

== History ==
Established in 1678 as (nominally) Metropolitan Archdiocese of Homs (or Emesa).

It later gained the merged-in titles of the suppressed eparchies of Hama of the Syriacs and Nabk of the Syriacs.This latter merger occurred some time after the death of its eparch Mar Matthew Nakkar in 1868.

== Episcopal ordinaries ==
Metropolitan Archeparchs (Archbishops) of Homs (Emesa)

- (all unavailable)

Metropolitan Archeparchs (Archbishops) of Homs-Hama-Nabk

- ...
- Gabriel Homsi (1816 – death 1858)
- Gregorio Giorgio Sciahin (1872.05.18 – death 1913)
- Joseph Rabbani (1927.04.29 – retired 1947.12.14), emeritates first as Titular Archbishop of Constantina (1947.12.14 – 1951.02.24), later as Titular Archbishop of Nacolia (1951.02.24 – 1973.05.02)
- Joseph Jacob Abiad (1971.05.11 – death 1982.07.31)
- Théophile Jean Dahi (1984.08.01 – retired 1994.07.01)
- Basile Moussa Daoud (1994.07.06 – 1998.10.13); previously Eparch (Bishop) of Cairo of the Syriacs (Egypt) ([1977.07.02] 1977.07.22 – 1994.07.01); later Patriarch of Antioch of the Syriacs (Lebanon) ([1998.10.13] 1998.10.20 – 2001.01.08), President of Synod of the Syriac Catholic Church (1998.10.20 – 2001.01.08), Prefect of Congregation for the Oriental Churches (2000.11.25 – 2007.06.09), Grand Chancellor of Pontifical Oriental Institute (2000.11.25 – 2007.06.09), Patriarch ad personam (2001.01.08 – 2012.04.07), Cardinal-Patriarch (2001.02.21 – 2012.04.07)
- Théophile Georges Kassab (1999.12.18 – death 2013.10.22), also Apostolic Administrator of the patriarchal proper diocese Beirut of the Syriacs (Lebanon) (2008.02.02 – 2009.01.20)
- Théophile Philippe Barakat (2016.4.15 – 2020.6.13)
  - Flaviano Al-Kabalan, Apostolic Administrator (2021.10.21. – 03.03.2023)
- Julian Yacoub Mourad (2023.01.07 – present), consecrated Archbishop 3 March 2023.
