= Julian of Emesa =

Syrian Christian physician and martyr

Ilyan of Homs
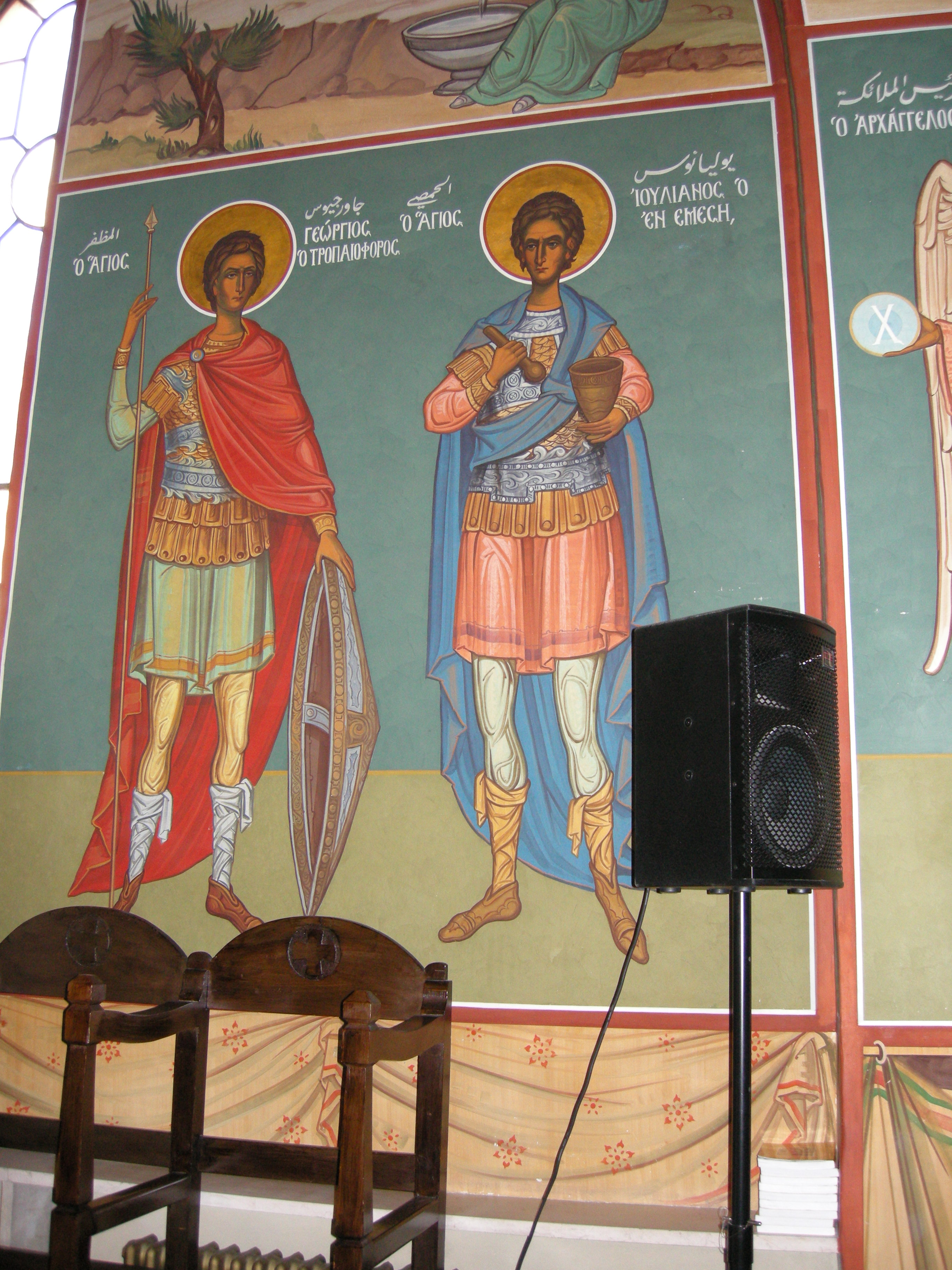
- Mural in the Cathedral of Our Lady of the Annunciation, Jerusalem, depicting Ilyan (Julian) of Homs as a physician (right), next to Saint George
- Born: Homs, Syria
- Died: 284 or 312 AD; Homs, Syria
- Honored in: Catholicism; Eastern Orthodoxy; Oriental Orthodoxy; Church of the East; Anglican Communion
- Major shrine: Homs, Antioch
- Feast: February 6: Eastern Orthodoxy; Catholicism; February 7: Oriental Orthodoxy; Ancient Church of the East
- Patronage: Homs, Syria; Brownsville, Pennsylvania; physicians, the sick, sons, and children

Julian of Emesa (Greek: Ἰουλιανός ὁ ἐν Ἐμέσῃ; Latin: Julianus Emesenus) or Elian al-Homsi (Arabic: إليان الحمصي), also spelt Elyan or Ilyan, was a third-century Christian from Emesa (modern Homs, in Syria) who reputedly practiced as a physician or healer. He was martyred, either in 284 or 312, for his refusal to renounce Christianity.

Venerated as a saint, his feast day is 6 February in the Catholic and Eastern Orthodox traditions, and 7 February in the Anglican, Oriental Orthodox and the Ancient Church of the East traditions.

The Church of Saint Elian was founded in 432 on the claimed spot of Julian's death, with his remains placed in a sarcophagus in a small chapel to the right of the church's main crypt.

== See also ==
- Monastery of St. Elian

== Bibliography ==
- Beattie, Andrew; Pepper, Timothy (2001). The Rough Guide to Syria. Rough Guides. ISBN 978-1-85828-718-8.
- Mannheim, Ivan (2001). Syria & Lebanon Handbook: The Travel Guide. Footprint Travel Guides. ISBN 978-1-900949-90-3.
