= Elian (Welsh saint) =

Fifth-century saint

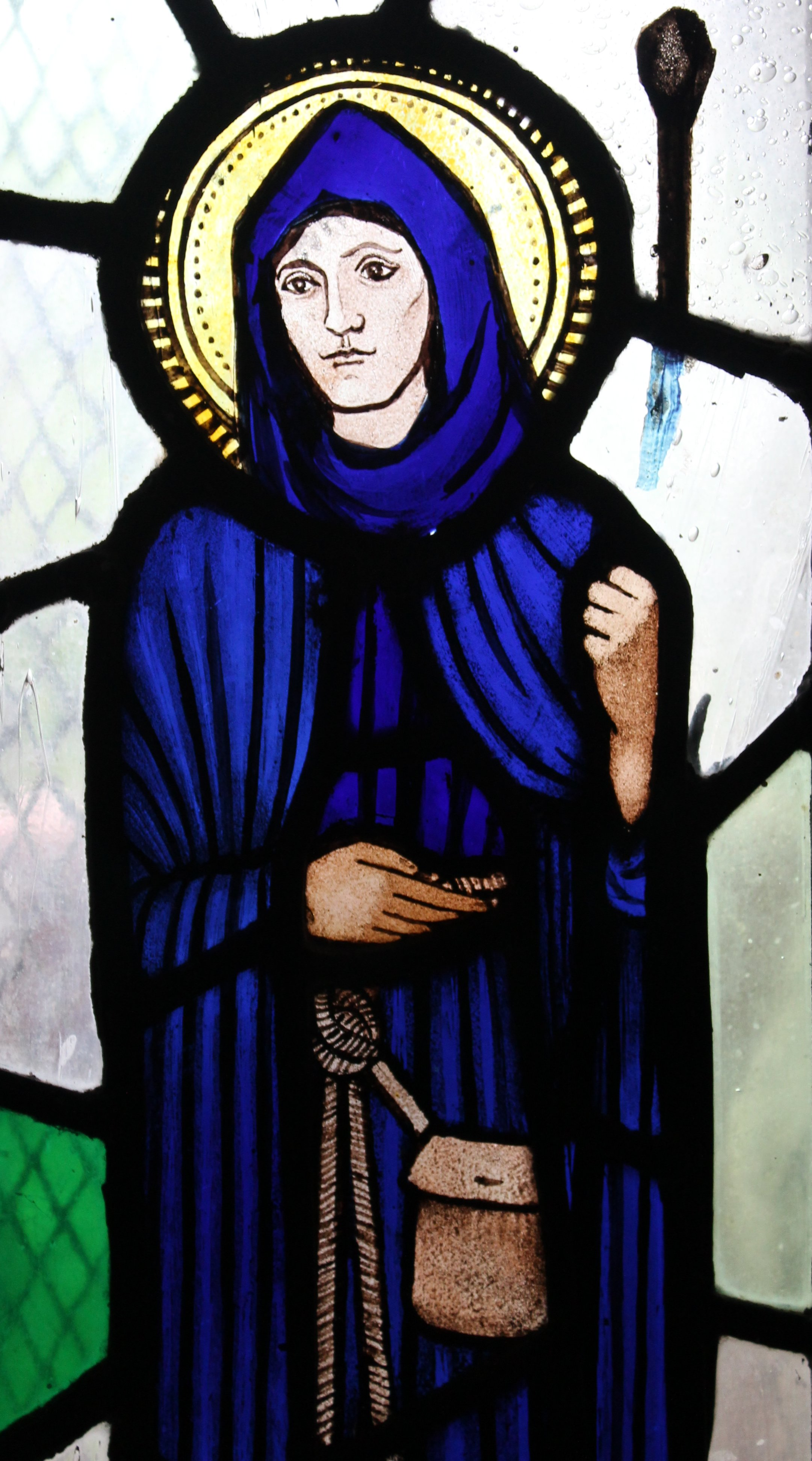
Elian shown in a stained glass window by Trena Cox in St Trillo's Chapel, Rhos-on-Sea (1934)

Elian was a saint who founded a church in North Wales around the year 450. His feast day is 13 January.

The legend of St. Elian says he was related to Isfael (another Welsh saint) and laboured in the missions of Cornwall, England.

Tradition holds that he came by sea from Rome bringing with him oxen and other livestock and landed in Anglesey at Porth yr Yehen, where he built his church. One folk tale says he forbade the keeping of greyhounds after one killed or disturbed a doe in his care.

According to tradition, Elian and Saint Cybi used to meet at Llanfrydog, midway between Llanelian and Holyhead, to confer on religious matters. Saint Eilian was especially invoked for the healing of sick children.

Llanelian Road in Colwyn Bay, North Wales, is named after him, as is St. Elian's Church in Llanelian. His nearby holy well, Ffynnon Elian, was, at one time, one of the most famous holy wells in Wales. The former civil parish of Llanelian-yn-Rhos in Conwy County Borough was named after him. His connection with Eglwysilan near Caerphilly is unclear.
