= Church of Saint Elian =

Church in Homs, Syria

Saint Elian Church
- كنيسة مار اليان
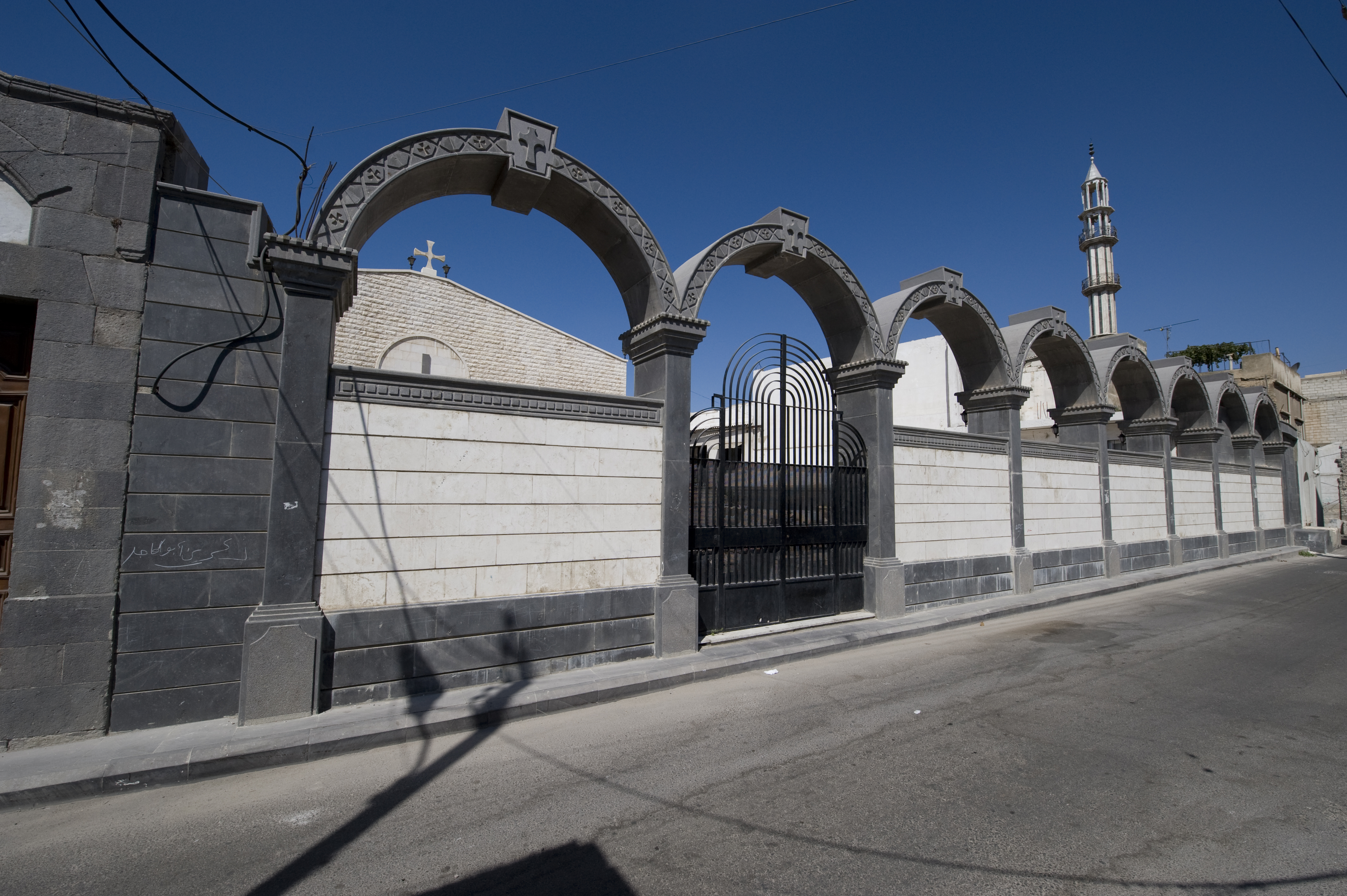

Religion
- Affiliation: Antiochian Orthodox Church
- Ecclesiastical or organizational status: Active
- Year consecrated: AD 432

Location
- Location: Homs, Syria
- Interactive map of Saint Elian Church
- Coordinates: 34.7288°N 36.7243°E

Architecture
- Type: Church
- Style: Byzantine architecture

The Church of Saint Elian (Arabic: كنيسة مار اليان, Kaneesat Mar Elian) is a church in Homs, Syria, located along Tarafa bin al-Abd Street near the Gate of Palmyra. The Feast of St. Elian is held annually at the church on February 6 and attracts a large number of pilgrims from all around Syria. Elian is also known in English as Julian. The only other Orthodox Christian church in the world named after St. Julian/Elian is in Brownsville, Pennsylvania, United States, and named St Ellien Antiochian Orthodox Church, built in 1917.

== Festal hymns and prayers ==
There are two Troparia written for St Elian/Julian. Here they are in both Arabic and English. The first is the standard one for a martyr.

طروباريّة باللحن الثّالث Troparion in Tone 3

أَيـُّها القِدِّيسُ اللابِسُ الجِهاد، وَالطَّبِيبُ الشّافي إِيليان، تشفع إلى الإلهِ الرَّحيم، أَنْ يُنْعِمَ بِغُفرانِ الزَّلاّتِ لِنُفُوسِنا O Saint clothed in strife and healing physician Julian, intercede with the merciful God that He may graciously grant forgiveness of sins to our souls.

طروباريّة غيرُها باللحن الرّابع، وزن: طاشي بروكاتالافه Another Tropar in Tone 4 (Having Learned)

لِنَمْدَحْ جَمِيعُنا بِأَناشِيدِ التَّعظِيم، شَهِيدًا صِنْدِيدًا وَطَبِيبًا يُعْطِي الشِّفاء، يَلِيقُ بِهِ التَّكْرِيم، مُنْجِدًا في الشَّقاءِ، بِانْعِطافٍ وَرَحمة، مُبْرِئَ السُّقَماءِ بِأَدْوِيَةِ النِّعمة، عَنَيتُ إِلْيانَ الحِمْصِي، شَفِيعَنا العَظِيم Let us all sing songs of veneration of the valiant martyr and unmercenary healing physician with honor befitting, supported in misery with light and mercy, reducing sickness with grace, namely Julian of Homs, our great intercessor.

Frescos inside the church

The following prayer for blessing oil for anointing the sick for healing is also associated with St Julian. "O God, Almighty and Eternal, whose property it is to forgive, to sustain and heal, Who wills that the sick and infirm may be cleansed and purged of their sins and may be cured and restored to perfect health and well-being, do Thou, O merciful Master Who lovest mankind, through the prayers and intercessions of the Holy Great Martyr Julian the unmercenary physician, light of Homs and healer of the universe, bless and sanctify this oil with Thy life-giving and restorative power. As the Holy Julian didst confess his faith with courage even unto death and victory and didst heal the poor and sick with generous charity, grant that this blessed oil may be an unction of strengthening both to souls and bodies, cooling fever, banishing pain, repairing what has been afflicted, granting soothing and refreshing sleep and restoring to peace and serenity and health and soundness the minds and bodies of those who are anointed therewith. O merciful Master protect and defend Thy servants (N.) from all evil, from all envy and from every illness of spirit or body, banish every inimical power, bless and cure them (N.) through Thy power, and the intercessions of Holy Julian, for all the powers of heaven praise Thee, and Thine is the kingdom and the power and the glory, together with Thine all-holy and life-creating Spirit, and Thine only-begotten son, both now and ever and unto ages of ages. Amen."

== History ==
The church is named after Saint Elian, a native of Emesa (now Homs), who was martyred for his refusal to renounce Christianity in 284 AD at the hands of his father, a Roman officer. St. Elian was a physician by trade and various miracles of healing are attributed to him. The church itself was founded in 432 on the claimed spot of St. Elian's death, with his remains placed in a sarcophagus in a small chapel to the right of the church's main crypt.

In 1969–70, the church was renovated. During the renovation, the plaster which covered the inner walls of the crypt was removed, revealing ancient frescoes depicting murals of Jesus, Mary, the Apostles, and various Biblical prophets. The frescoes date to at least the 12th century, but it is widely believed to date to the 6th century, making them the oldest surviving church paintings in Syria. Today, they are complemented by new frescoes in the main nave and side-aisles of the church painted by two Romanian iconographers, showing various scenes of St. Elian's lifetime.

== See also ==
- Saint Mary Church of the Holy Belt

== Bibliography ==
- Beattie, Andrew; Pepper, Timothy (2001). The Rough Guide to Syria. Rough Guides. ISBN 978-1-85828-718-8.
- Immerzeel, Mat (2005). "The Wall Paintings in the Church of Mar Elian at Homs: A 'Restoration Project' of a Nineteenth-Century Palestinian Master". Eastern Christian Art. 2. doi:10.2143/ECA.2.0.2004557.
- Mannheim, Ivan (2001). Syria & Lebanon Handbook: The Travel Guide. Footprint Travel Guides. ISBN 978-1-900949-90-3.
