= Ali Sharif al-Emadi =

Qatari economist and businessman (born 1969)

His Excellency Ali Sharif al-Emadi
- علي شريف العمادي
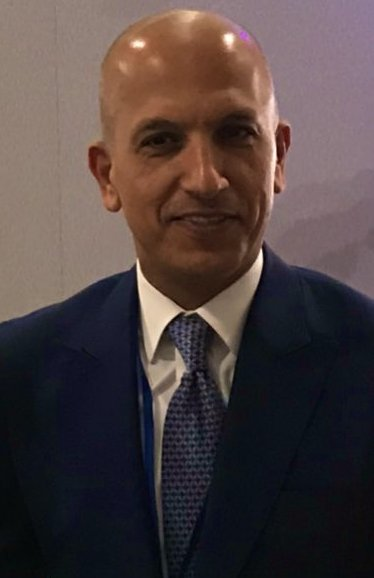
- Al Emadi in 2019

Minister of Finance
- In office 26 June 2013 – 6 May 2021
- Monarch: Tamim bin Hamad
- Prime Minister: Abdullah bin Nasser; Khalid bin Khalifa
- Preceded by: Yousef Hussain
- Succeeded by: Ali bin Ahmed

Personal details
- Born: 3 January 1969 (age 57)
- Education: University of Arizona

Ali Sharif al-Emadi (Arabic: علي شريف العمادي; born 3 January 1969) is a Qatari economist and businessman. He served as the minister of finance from June 2013 to May 2021. He also served as chairman of the QNB Group and was on the board of directors of Ooredoo, Tunisian-Qatari Bank, and Union of Arab Banks.

== Early life and education ==
Al-Emadi was born on 3 January 1969. He holds a bachelor's degree in finance from the University of Arizona.

== Career ==
Al-Emadi worked in the banking control department of the Qatar Central Bank for eight years until 1998. He joined the Qatar National Bank in 1998. He was appointed the bank's chief executive in 2005, succeeding Saeed bin Abdullah al-Misnad in the post. Al-Emadi was included in the Top 100 Powerful Arabs list in February 2013, coming in the 32nd place due to his role in the rapid growth and expansion of the Qatar National Bank. His tenure lasted until June 2013. He was appointed minister of economy and finance on 26 June in a cabinet reshuffle following the ascension of Sheikh Tamim bin Hamad Al Thani as Emir of Qatar. Al-Emadi replaced Yousef Hussain Kamal in the post.

He was named as a member of the administrative council of the Qatar Investment Authority (QIA) on 1 July 2013. He was also made board chairman of Qatar National Bank on 7 July 2013.

The Intercept reported on 2 March 2018 that Jared Kushner and his father, Charles Kushner, made a proposal to Qatar’s finance minister, al-Emadi, in April 2017 to secure investment into 666 5th Avenue asset in his family's company’s portfolio. When his request was not fulfilled, a group of Middle Eastern countries, with Jared Kushner’s backing, initiated a diplomatic assault that culminated in a blockade of Qatar. Kushner specifically undermined the efforts by Secretary of State Rex Tillerson to bring an end to the standoff.

=== Arrest and charges ===
On 6 May 2021, a notice was issued by the Attorney General of Qatar to arrest him on charges of misuse of public money, abuse of function and abuse of power. In late May, al-Emadi was dismissed from his post as the board chairman of Qatar National Bank following his arrest.

In March 2023, Al Elmadi was charged with bribery, abuse of position and power, damage to public funds and money laundering, for which he will stand trial.
