= Mohammed bin Hamad bin Qassim Al Abdullah Al Thani =

Qatari politician

Minister of Commerce and Industry
- In office 19 October 2021 – 12 November 2024
- Monarch: Tamim bin Hamad Al Thani
- Prime Minister: Khalid bin Khalifa bin Abdulaziz Al Thani
- Preceded by: Ali bin Ahmed Al Kuwari
- Succeeded by: Faisal bin Thani bin Faisal Al Thani

Mohammed bin Hamad bin Qassim Al Abdullah Al Thani is a Qatari politician. Previously, he had served as Minister of Commerce and Industry from 19 October 2021 until 12 November 2024.

== Career ==
Until 2012, Al Thani worked as Director of the Risk Management Department at the Qatar Central Bank.

From 2012 to 2017, he was the Secretary of the Personal Representative of Qatar's Emir Sheikh Tamim bin Hamad Al Thani.

From 2018 until 2021, Al Thani served as Deputy-Governor and Vice-Chairman of Qatar Central Bank and Deputy Chairman of the QFC Regulatory Authority. Between November 2018 and October 2021, he was Chairman of the Qatar Financial Markets Authority.

Between October 2021 and November 2024, Al Thani had worked as the Qatari Minister of Commerce and Industry. He is a member of the Board of Directors of the Qatar Investment Authority.
