= Emadi =

Al-Emadi (Arabic: العمادي) is an Arab family and tribal lineage that is commonly found in Qatar and Bahrain. People with the surname include:

- Mohammed bin Abdulrahim Al-Emadi, Qatari businessman
- Mohammed bin Ismail Al-Emadi, Qatari Ambassador, politician and businessman
- Yousef Hussain Kamal Al Emadi, Former Qatari minister of finance, politician and businessman
- Ibrahim bin Hassan alasmakh Al-Emadi, Qatari businessman
- Abdullah bin Mohammed Al-Emadi, Qatari businessman
- Mohammed bin abdulkarim Al-Emadi, Qatari businessman and real estate developer
- Ali Sharif Al Emadi, Former Qatari Minister of finance, economist and businessman
- Nayef bin Abdullah alsiddiqi Al-Emadi, Qatari Ambassador and politician
- Mohammed Ismail Mandani Al-Emadi, Qatari economist and businessman
- Hassan bin Mohammed Rafee Al-Emadi, Qatari ambassador, politician and businessman
- Abdulaziz bin Abdulrahim Al-Emadi, Qatari businessman
- Khalid Kamal Al-Emadi, Qatari Shura council member
- Jassim alasmakh Al-Emadi, Qatari politician
- Abdulhamed bin Abdulrahim Al-Emadi, Qatari businessman
- Dr Abdulaziz Kamal Al-Emadi, Qatari professor
- Ismail Shareef Al-Emadi, Qatari shura council member
- Fareed Asad Al-Emadi, Kuwaiti politician
