= Qatar Finance and Business Academy =

QFBA
- Qatar Finance and Business Academy
- Established: 2009
- Affiliations: Qatar Financial Centre; Qatar Foundation; Bath Consultancy Group; Chartered Institute for Securities & Investment (CISI); Chartered Insurance Institute; Qatar Faculty of Islamic Studies; ICMA Centre; International Management & Finance Academy (IMA); Northumbria University Newcastle
- Location: Doha, Qatar

QFBA (Qatar Finance and Business Academy) is an educational Institution established in 2009. under the endorsement of the Qatar Financial Centre Authority. It is aimed at instructing entry-level to senior executive professionals in financial disciplines which include banking, asset management, capital markets and insurance.

It intends to increase the capacity of and support the creation of financial services expertise concerning the financial sector of Qatar.

This is linked to the Human Development pillar of Qatar Vision 2030, attempting to transform Qatar into a knowledge-based economy.

== Educational partners and certifying bodies ==
- The Chartered Institute for Securities and Investment (CISI) offers teaching and development to financial professionals.
- Chartered Insurance Institute (CII)
- Faculty of Islamic Studies
- ICMA Centre at Henley Business School a part of the Henley Business School and University of Reading.
- International Management & Finance Academy (IMFA), a regional, non-profit, non-governmental institution with a particular focus on banking.
- NYSE Euronext, created by the merger of NYSE Group and Euronext in 2007. They operate the world's largest exchange group. In 2009, NYSE Euronext partnered with Qatar Investment Authority to form the Qatar Exchange, successor to Doha Securities Market.
- Northumbria University Newcastle

== Location ==
QFBA is housed inside the Qatar Financial Centre (Tower 2) situated in West Bay, Doha. The academy occupies five floors which include administration offices, a trading floor simulation room run by Thomson Reuters and coaching pods and conference facilities.
