= Abdalla Al-Hamar =

Qatari diplomat

Ambassador of Qatar to Germany
- Incumbent
- Assumed office September 2024
- Monarch: Tamim bin Hamad Al Thani
- Prime Minister: Mohammed bin Abdulrahman bin Jassim Al Thani
- Preceded by: Sheikh Abdulla bin Mohammed Al-Thani

Personal details
- Education: University of Arizona
- Profession: Diplomat

Abdalla Al-Hamar is a Qatari diplomat currently serving as the Ambassador of the State of Qatar to the Federal Republic of Germany. He has held several ambassadorial positions throughout his career, representing Qatar in countries including Syria, Thailand, Vietnam, Singapore, and Spain.

== Early life and education ==
Al-Hamar studied civil engineering at the University of Arizona in the United States in 1987. After completing his studies, he returned to Qatar and began his professional career in the Ministry of Municipal Affairs and Agriculture. He later transitioned to the Ministry of Foreign Affairs, where he served as head of the information department.

== Diplomatic career ==
Al-Hamar began his career in public service as Director of the Office of the Minister of Municipalities and Agriculture from 1987 to 1996. He subsequently joined the Ministry of Foreign Affairs in 1996, where he worked as Director of the Information and Research Administration in 1997.

Al-Hamar joined the diplomatic service of Qatar in the early 2000s. His first ambassadorial appointment was to Syria, where he served from 2001 to 2003. He was later appointed as the Ambassador to Thailand from 2004 to 2010. In 2014, he was named Ambassador to Vietnam, and subsequently, in 2016, he served as Ambassador to Singapore.

In 2019, Al-Hamar was appointed Ambassador to the Kingdom of Spain. During his tenure in Madrid, he managed Qatar’s diplomatic and economic relations, including overseeing major investment and cultural initiatives. He represented Qatar at several international forums, including events organized by the United Nations World Tourism Organization (UNWTO).

Under the tenure of H.E. Abdalla Al Hamar, Qatar and Spain marked 50 years of diplomatic relations with a joint declaration that included 12 agreements to expand bilateral cooperation.

In 2024, he was appointed Ambassador to Germany, succeeding Sheikh Abdulla bin Mohammed Al-Thani. He presented his credentials to German President Frank-Walter Steinmeier on 5 September 2024, officially beginning his mission.
