= Yousef Hussain Kamal Al Emadi =

Qatari Economist and Politician

Yousef Hussain Kamal
- يوسف حسين كمال

Minister of Finance

Personal details
- Born: 1 January 1948 (age 78) Doha, Qatar

Yousef Hussain Kamal (Arabic: يوسف حسين كمال; born 1 January 1948) is a Qatari economist and politician. He served as Minister of Finance from 1998 until 2013, when he was succeeded by Ali Sharif Al Emadi.

Kamal earned a bachelor’s degree in business administration from Cairo University in 1973, and began his career the same year as a section chief in Qatar’s Ministry of Finance and Petroleum. He later became Director of Financial Affairs and Under Secretary of the Ministry of Finance.

As Finance Minister, Kamal was responsible for implementing monetary and economic policies, including his government’s response to high inflation from 2006 to 2008, as well as a new tax law in 2009. He also helped coordinate the Fourth WTO Ministerial Conference in Doha in 2001, which saw China’s entry into the World Trade Organization. In addition to his official state role, Kamal served as chair of many Qatari institutions both before and during his tenure as Minister of Finance, including Qatar National Bank, Qatar Steel, RasGas, Qatar Financial Centre and the Doha Securities Market. He also served on the boards of Qatar Airways, the Qatar Investment Authority (QIA), Qatari Diar Real Estate Investment Company, and the Qatar Central Bank.

In 2011, Kamal was named Best Finance Minister in the Middle East and North Africa by Euromoney.
