= Zead Khalaf =

Iraqi banker and entrepreneur

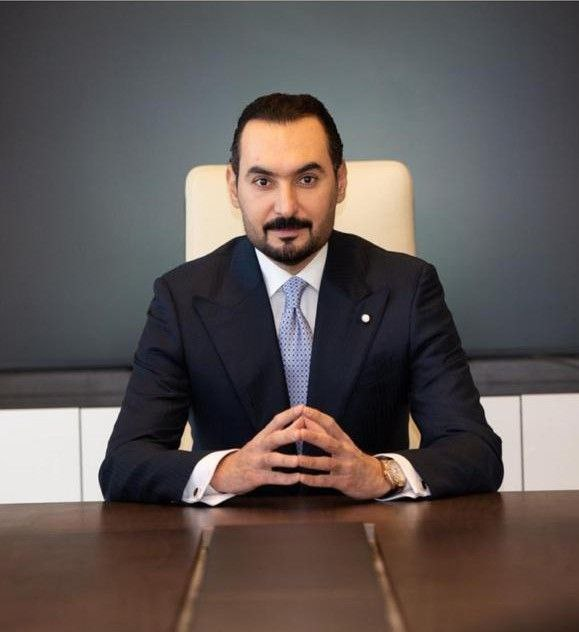
- Born: April 4, 1980 (age 45); Iraq
- Occupations: Banker, entrepreneur
- Organization(s): International Development Bank, ZK Holding
- Title: Chairman of the Board of Directors Of International Development Bank, Chairman of ZK Holding

Zead Khalaf (born April 4, 1980) is an Iraqi banker and entrepreneur. He serves as the Chairman of the International Development Bank one of Iraq's largest private banks and Chairman of ZK Holding, an Abu Dhabi-based conglomerate with diverse investments working in the development of investments and trade between the UAE and Iraq.

Dr. Zead Khalaf holds key positions in several key organizations. He sits on the Board of Directors of the Union of Arab Banks, representing the Iraqi banking sector at the pan-Arab level, and on the Board of the International Chamber of Commerce – UAE.

== Early life and education ==
Zead Khalaf was born on April 4, 1980, into the Khalaf Abed family, which was active in the contracting field. He holds a bachelor's degree in civil engineering from the University of Technology in Baghdad. He has also received an honorary doctorate in financial sciences from International Colleges in London.

== Career ==
In 2011, Zead Khalaf co-founded the International Development Bank (IDB). He formally assumed the position of chairman of the Board of IDB in 2015. Dr. Zead Khalaf’ managed to develop the IDB into a top-tier private bank in Iraq. He oversaw the bank's strategic expansion beyond Iraq's borders, establishing a presence in the United Arab Emirates. In 2024, IDB entered a joint venture with global logistics leader Aramex to enhance logistics and shipping services in Iraq – a partnership that uses IDB's extensive local network of over 7,000 service points.

As Chairman of ZK Holding, he oversees a portfolio of diverse companies operating in finance, insurance, technology, energy, industry, real estate, and e-payments.

In May 2019, he was elected as a board member of the Union of Arab Banks, which unites financial institutions across 22 Arab countries. In this capacity, he represents Iraqi private banks and contributes to setting pan-Arab banking strategies. He has been instrumental in UAB's initiatives to improve compliance, financial inclusion, and inter-bank cooperation in the Arab region. He is also at the Board of Directors of the International Chamber of Commerce in the UAE.

== Recognitions ==
Zead Khalaf was honored by the United Nations for supporting innovations that enhance sustainable development in the Arab region. He was awarded as the most distinguished banking businessman in the world of finance and business.

== Memberships ==
In 2024, Zead Khalaf was awarded the First-class Arab Tourism Medal by the Executive Council of the Arab Tourism Organization.

Zead Khalaf is also a member of the Board of Directors of the Union of Arab Banks, the International Union of Arab Bankers, the Board of Directors of the International Chamber of Commerce in the UAE, and the Board of Trustees of the Arab Academy for Administrative, Financial, and Banking Sciences.
