= Tanzanian Private Equity Association =

Tanzanian Private Equity & Venture Capital Association
- Abbreviation: TAVCA
- Formation: 2013
- Legal status: Non-profit company
- Location: Dar es Salaam, Tanzania
- Website: www.tavca.com

The Tanzanian Private Equity & Venture Capital Association (TAVCA) is a non–profit lobbying body facilitating the creation of an environment fostering sustainable private equity ("PE") and venture capital ("VC") investment in Tanzania.

TAVCA facilitates dialogue on a sustainable code of conduct for the African PE context, customised to a Tanzanian setting. TAVCA identifies innovative structured financial instruments and designs policy to stimulate investment for the empowerment of Tanzanians.

== History ==
Events endorsing a PE platform customised to Tanzania include:

=== Experts in VC and PE financing required ===
Opening a consultative seminar on venture capital and private equity financing organised by the Tanzania Private Sector Foundation (TPSF), Dr Mary Nagu, Minister of State Prime Minister’s Office, Investment and Empowerment told participants that given the numerous investment opportunities emerging in various sectors of the economy, the country requires experts in venture capital and private equity.

=== Alternative source of finance to companies in Tanzania ===
At the end of 2014 over 200 local and international investors met in Dar es Salaam "to deliberate on expanding investment opportunities in Tanzania through non banking financial instruments, specifically, Venture and Private Equity Financing." Opening the proceedings, Tanzania Vice President, Dr Mohamed Gharib Bilal said, “The efforts to develop the private equity and venture capital as an alternative source of finance to our companies in Tanzania is warmly welcomed and unconditionally supported ...”

=== In the wake of US$180 million African-focused PE fund ===
TAVCA was established in 2013 in the wake of the US$180 million private equity fund, PMEA African Infrastructure Opportunities plc (LON: PMEA), the Sovereign Wealth Fund of the Qatar Investment Authority (2007 Alternative Investment Market listing). Learning from the mistakes of purely private investments and the dynamics of patronage networks, TAVCA is playing a part in establishing an ethically performing sustainable industry in Tanzania.

== External sources ==
- PMEA African Infrastructure Opportunities plc: http://www.londonstockexchange.com/exchange/prices-and-markets/stocks/summary/company-summary/IM00B1WSL611IMUSDAIM.html
- Policy Discussion Paper: The Role for Private Equity in Tanzania - Development Leadership: http://www.tavca.com/TAVCA_PE_Paper.pdf
- Seminar springboard for private equity lobby formation: http://www.ippmedia.com/frontend/?l=62779
- SMEs stagnant for lack of investment: http://www.busiweek.com/index1.php?Ctp=2&pI=2139&pLv=3&srI=79&spI=454
- Tanzania: Pension Funds Dominate Venture Capital Fund: http://allafrica.com/stories/201411100178.html
- Public invited to access venture capital: http://www.ippmedia.com/frontend/?l=81335
- Tanzania private sector gets 1.5 million into jobs: http://www.busiweek.com/index1.php?Ctp=2&pI=2163&pLv=3&srI=49&spI=27
- Tanzania: Benefits of Venture Capital Financing Scheme Spelt Out: http://allafrica.com/stories/201411100119.html
