= Hassad Food =

Qatari agricultural company

Hassad Food Company
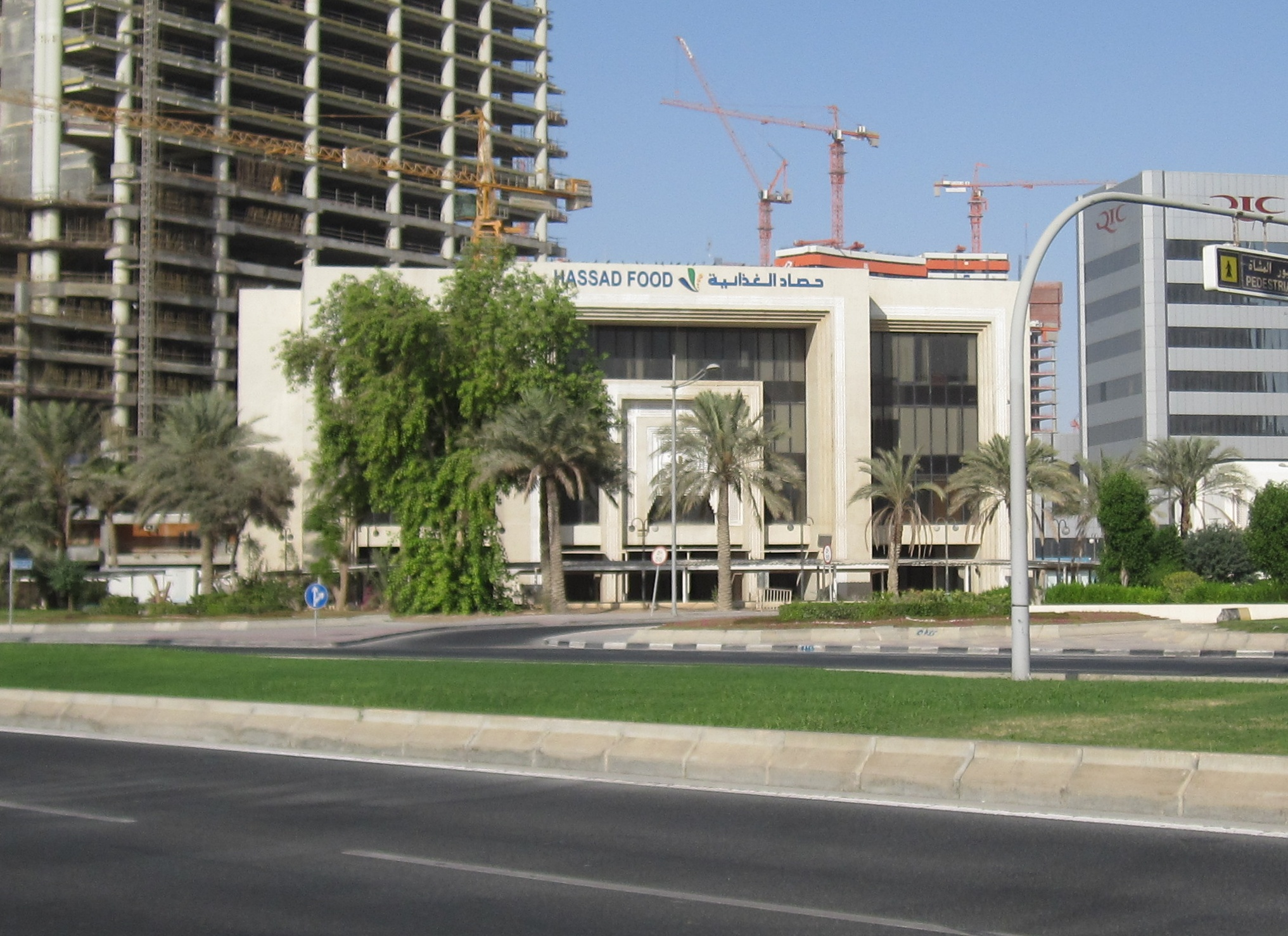
- Hassad Food headquarters in Doha (2011)
- Native name: حصاد الغذائية
- Type: Private
- Industry: Investment
- Founded: 2008; 18 years ago
- Headquarters: Doha, Qatar
- Key people: Ali Hilal Al Kuwari (CEO)
- Owner: Qatar Investment Authority
- Website: www.hassad.com

The Hassad Food Company is an investment arm of the Qatar Investment Authority with a primary focus on the field of agriculture. The company has the stated goal of meeting 60% of Qatar's food demand.

== History ==
Hassad Food was established in 2008 with the aim of attaining food self-sufficiency for Qatar.

== Investments ==
It was announced in June 2013 that the company was planning on investing $500 million in India in order to secure the production of coffee, rice and cardamom. As part of this objective, the company acquired majority ownership of Indian food production company Bush Foods Overseas Ltd in April 2013. In December 2014, Hassad Food submitted a First Information Report against Bush Food Overseas Ltd on the basis that they had allegedly falsified their financial statements and inventory records.

Hassad Food officially declared its intent to invest $400 million into Turkey's agriculture industry in October 2014. In April 2015, the company revealed its plans to invest $1 billion in Sudan.

== Subsidiaries ==
=== Hassad Australia ===
Established in November 2009, the company's Oceania-based subsidiary Hassad Australia represents its first significant overseas investment. Lindsay Falvey is the Foundation Director. In October 2013, Hassad Australia's annual production output was estimated to be 100,000 sheep and 150,000 tonnes of grain.

As of June 2014, Hassad Australia owns thirteen farms measuring 750,000 ha. in Australia for the purposes of sheep and wheat production. The company's total investment in Australia's agriculture industry was valued at a reported $500 million as of 2015. Criticism has been leveled at the company's land grabbing activities within Australia.

Up to 2017, Hassad Food had invested more than $500 million to buy prime agricultural land in Australia, to own 3,000 square kilometres, with five properties in New South Wales, one in Victoria, one in Queensland, three in South Australia and three in Western Australia. The company was proposing to invest another $500 million in Australia. Senator Bernardi has said, "We can have a debate and a discussion about the wisdom of foreign ownership of some of our strategic assets, but I do not know how anyone can justify a government that is recognised by its peers and our allies as the funder of terrorism owning such resources in our own country". A history of the whole Hassad Australia venture was released in 2019 by Lindsay Falvey.

=== Zulal Oasis ===
Zulal Oasis was formed as a subsidiary of Hassad Food in 2013, as a joint venture with Oasis Agrotechnology, S.L, a Spanish company that is a consortium of four Spanish companies in Almería, Spain. Oasis and its constituent companies have more than 30,000 hectares under cultivation in Almería. Oasis was responsible for adapting the proprietary hydroponic technology of one of its members for use in the unique environmental conditions in the Gulf, i.e., very high summer temperatures together with high humidity. Zulal Oasis has achieved year round production of vegetables, which is unique in Qatar, by developing a dry air cooling system that uses no water, unlike commonly used evaporative cooling systems. As much as 87% of Zulal Oasis vegetable produce is classified in the top band of EU grading standards, and less than 1% of vegetable produce is rejected. Agricultural yield per unit of water used is highest using Zulal Oasis technology, compared to both other greenhouse technologies and open field cultivation. Because an aggregate of 98% of Qatar's fruit and vegetable imports is imported via one road from Saudi Arabia, Zulal Oasis has the primary goal of reaching 50 to 70 percent vegetable self-sufficiency for Qatar. The company's primary facility is a research and development greenhouse in Al-Shahaniya which uses a specially designed dry air cooling system and crop growing system. This system is intended to be more cost-effective while also broadening the scope of viable crop options. Around 200 hectares of land are allocated to the company.

== See also ==
- Qatar
- 2017 Qatar diplomatic crisis
