= Abdullah bin Khalid Al Attiyah =

Former governor of the Central Bank of Qatar

Governor of the Central Bank of Qatar
- In office January 1990 – May 2006
- Preceded by: Majid Muhammad Majid al-Saad
- Succeeded by: Abdullah bin Saud al-Thani

Personal details
- Born: 1953 (age 72–73)

Abdullah bin Khalid Al Attiyah is a Qatari banker and former governor of the Central Bank of Qatar.

He was born in 1953 in Qatar. He has degrees in public policy from Johns Hopkins University and in public administration from Central Michigan University.

Al Attiyah worked as first secretary in the Qatari embassy to the USA from 1978 to 1982. Then he worked in Qatar National Bank since 1982, and was chosen as the chief executive of Qatar National Bank from December 1986 to January 1990. He was appointed governor of the Qatar Monetary Agency in 1990. He retired in May 2006. The position of the governor of the central bank was elevated to a ministerial rank in 1992.
