= Ali bin Towar al-Kuwari =

Qatari Television Presenter and author

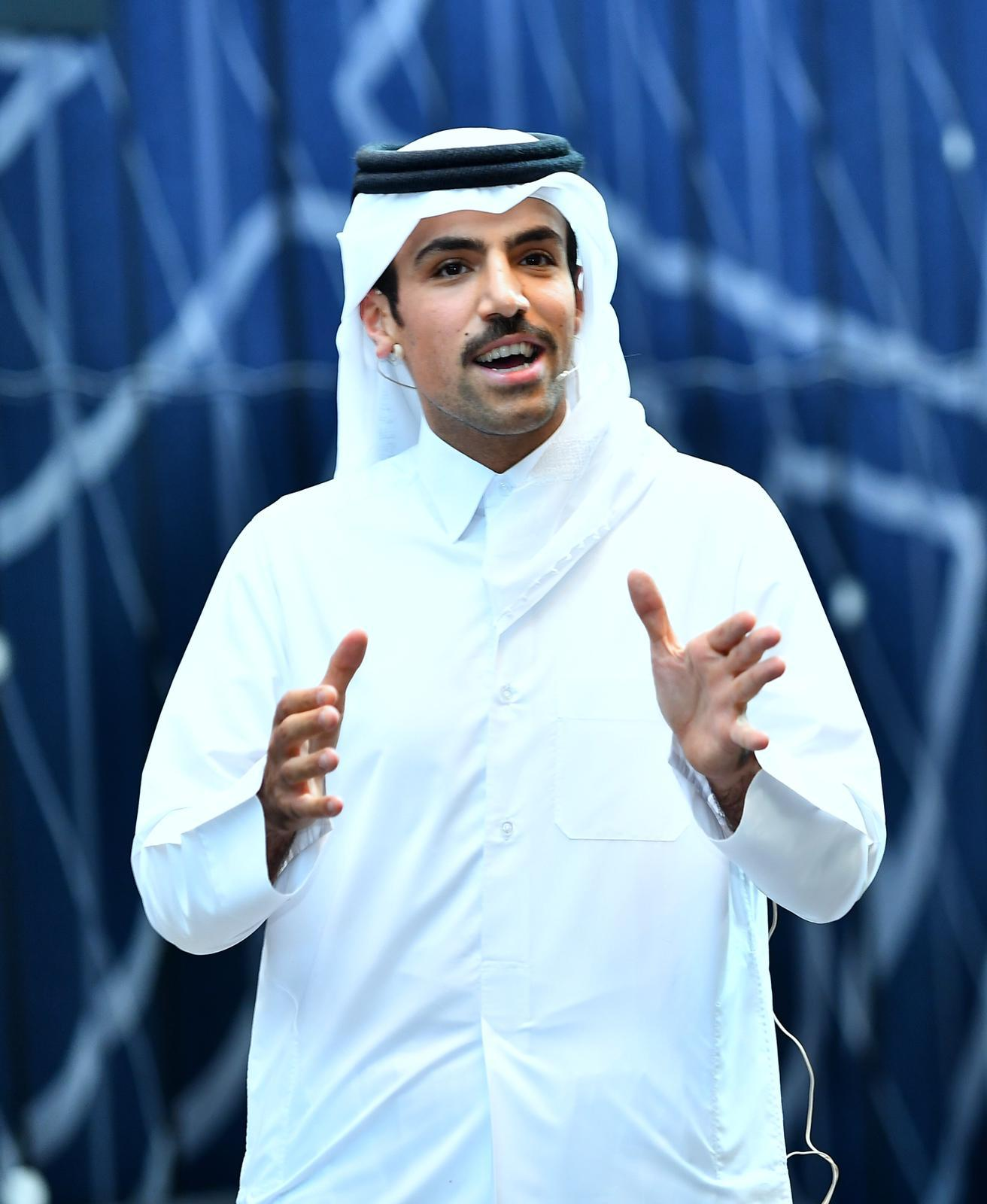
- Born: 6 December 1990 (age 35); Doha, Qatar
- Citizenship: Qatar
- Education: Bachelors of international Relations, MBA
- Alma mater: University of San Diego
- Occupations: television presenter, writer, traveller, entrepreneur
- Organization: Ali Bin Towar Network
- Known for: Tv Presenter
- Notable work: Khota El Rahala
- Website: www.alibintowar.com

Ali bin Towar al-Kuwari (Arabic: علي بن طوار الكواري; born 6 December 1990) is a Qatari television presenter, traveler, athlete, and author of The Life of an Adventurer. He is also the brand ambassador of Ooredoo, an international telecommunication company based in Doha, Qatar.

Ali is known for his work as host of Khota El Rahala on Qatar TV and Al Jazeera TV, an Arabic travel series, and is named among the 'most influential young personalities' in Qatar and the Persian Gulf region.

== Early life ==
Born and grew up in Doha, Qatar, Ali attended primary and secondary education in Qatar and moved to the United States to pursue higher studies. He graduated with a bachelor's degree in international relations in 2014 and received a Master of Science in Business Administration (MBA) from the University of San Diego in 2015.

== Career ==
Ali has hosted numerous television shows on Qatar TV and Al Jazeera Documentary channels including Khota El Rahala for which he rose to fame. In this series he visits various countries of the world to enrich viewers with engaging travel and cultural experiences among different people and communities.

He has represented many brands and official bodies as an ambassador and, in 2020, was chosen as the brand ambassador of Ooredoo. He was brand ambassador of Vodafone Qatar.

Ali is also one of the founding members of Drago for Education campaign, which collects donations to build schools in Gaza.

== Books ==
- The Life of an Adventurer
