= Qatar National Broadband Network =

Information technology company in Qatar

- Founded: 2011; 15 years ago
- Headquarters: Doha, Qatar
- Key people: Essa Al Kuwari (chairman); Ahmad Al Kuwari (CEO)
- Website: qnbn.qa

Qatar National Broadband Network (Qnbn) is a shareholding company owned by the Government of Qatar. It was set up in 2011 by the Supreme Council of Information & Communication Technology (ictQATAR) as one of the region’s first government initiatives giving full support for Qatar’s fiber optic network rollout.

== Role ==
In line with Qatar National Vision 2030 and Qatar ICT Strategy 2015, Qnbn develops a broadband infrastructure to provide an ICT infrastructure for homes, government, businesses and key sectors across the economy.

Qnbn signed agreements with state licensed telecommunication operators in Qatar to bring fiber broadband to the country, and plans to achieve maximum coverage of households and businesses. Qnbn promotes excellence in broadband infrastructure at QITCOM 2014, on 26–28 May 2014 at the Qatar National Convention Center (QNCC).

== Regulation/License ==
ictQATAR issued an Authorization to Qnbn on July 14, 2011 followed by a 25-year license in July 2012 to provide Qatar with fiber optic broadband throughout the country, offering wholesale broadband fiber optic infrastructure services to licensed network service providers and operators.
Qnbn focuses upon the deployment of a passive dark fiber network infrastructure, providing equal and open access to telecommunication service providers, on a wholesale basis, and owners and operators of private networks, on a retail basis, thereby enabling end users to efficiently leverage high speed fiber in Qatar.

== Merger with Gulf Bridge International ==
In 2024, Qatar Investment Authority announced plans to merge the telecommunications businesses of QNBN and Gulf Bridge International (GBI). They expected to close the transaction in Q4 2024.
