= Faisal bin Thani bin Faisal Al Thani =

Qatari politician

Minister of Commerce and Industry
- Incumbent
- Assumed office 12 November 2024
- Monarch: Tamim bin Hamad Al Thani
- Prime Minister: Mohammed bin Abdulrahman Al Thani
- Preceded by: Mohammed bin Hamad bin Qassim Al Abdullah Al Thani

Personal details
- Education: HEC Paris (MBA)

Sheikh Faisal bin Thani bin Faisal Al Thani is Qatar's Minister of Commerce and Industry (MoCI). He has held the position since 12 November.

Al Thani's career has centered on senior investment and corporate roles in Qatar, alongside board experience with international companies.

== Education and career ==
Al Thani holds a Bachelor in Business Administration and Finance from Marymount University in the United States and an Executive Master's degree in Business Administration from HEC Paris.

Sheikh Faisal bin Thani bin Faisal Al Thani is vice chairman and managing director of Doha Investment. He chairs the boards of the Qatar Free Zones Authority, the Qatar Financial Centre Authority, Qatar Stock Exchange, Ooreedo Group and Lesha Bank. He chairs the advisory bodies of the Investment Promotion Agency (Invest Qatar) and Companies House.

Al Thani is also deputy chairman of Qatar Development Bank and serves on the boards of the Qatar Investment Authority, Qatar Airways Group and Qatar Insurance Company. He is a member of the Supreme Council for Economic Affairs and Investment, the National Planning Council and the Supreme Council for the Preparation of the Third National Development Strategy.

Earlier in his career, Al Thani served as chief investment officer for Asia and Africa at the Qatar Investment Authority and held several other leadership positions there. From 2014 to 2017, he was chief investment officer at the Qatar Foundation Endowment. He worked in investment management at Qatar Central Bank from 2010 to 2014.

He previously served as chairman of the board of directors of the Qatar Banking Studies and Business Administration Secondary School and as vice chairman of Vodafone Qatar from 2013 to 2016. His previous board memberships include Ahlibank, Qatari Diar Real Estate Investment Company, Nakilat, Bharti Airtel, and Siemens Qatar.
