= Ministry of Finance (Qatar) =

Government ministry of Qatar

Qatar Ministry of Finance
Agency overview
- Formed: 1960
- Jurisdiction: Government of Qatar
- Headquarters: Doha
- Agency executive: Ali bin Ahmed Al Kuwari, Minister of Finance
- Website: mof.gov.qa

The Ministry of Finance is the ministry responsible for handling Qatar's public finances.

== Ministers ==
- Sheikh Khalifa bin Hamad Al Thani, 1960–1972
- Sheikh Abdelaziz bin Khalifa Al Thani, 1972-1992
- Abdullah bin Hamad Al Attiyah, 1992-1995
- Sheikh Mohammed bin Khalifa Al Thani, 1995-1998
- Yousef Hussain Kamal, 1998-2013
- Ali Sharif Al Emadi, 2013-2021
- Ali bin Ahmed al Kuwari 2021-present

== See also ==
- Politics of Qatar
- Qatar Central Bank
- Economy of Qatar
