= Celonis =

German software company

Celonis SE
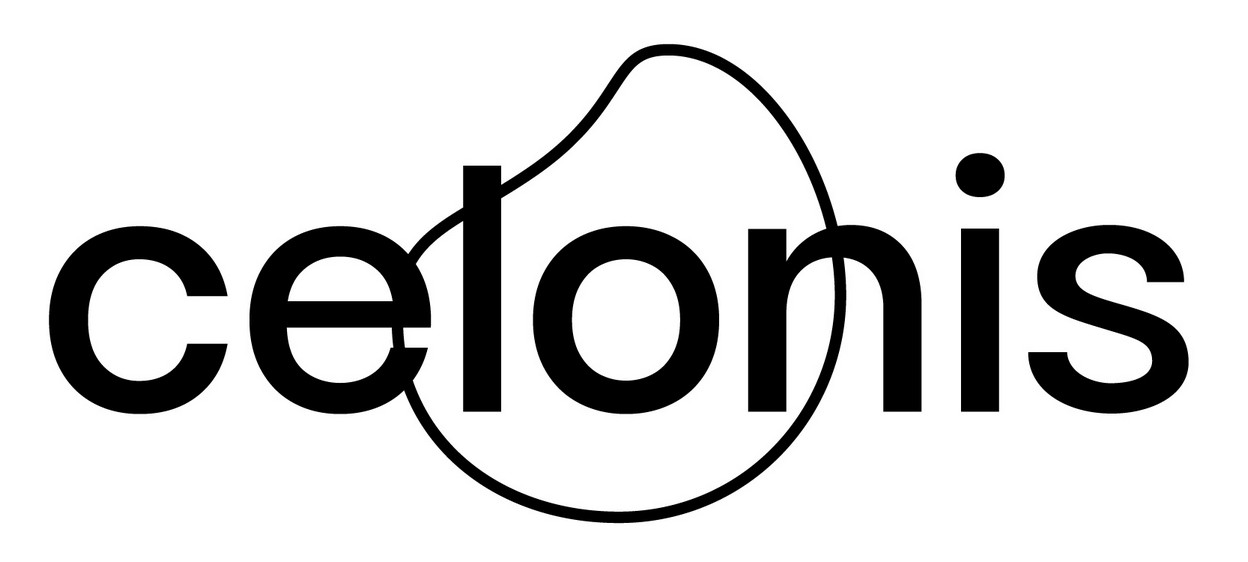
- Type: Private company
- Industry: Enterprise software, cloud computing, SaaS
- Founded: 2011; 15 years ago
- Founders: Alex Rinke (co-CEO); Bastian Nominacher (co-CEO); Martin Klenk (CTO)
- Headquarters: Munich, Germany; New York, United States
- Number of locations: 17 (2021)
- Area served: Worldwide
- Number of employees: 3,000+
- Website: celonis.com

Celonis SE is a German data processing company that offers software as a service (SaaS) to improve business processes. It is headquartered in Munich, Germany with a secondary headquarters New York, United States.

== History ==
Celonis was founded in 2011 by Alex Rinke, Bastian Nominacher, and Martin Klenk as a spin-off from the Technical University of Munich (TUM). Previously, the three had jointly analyzed the internal service processes of the broadcasting organization as part of several consulting projects at Munich's largest student consulting firm ("Academy Consult") for Bayerischer Rundfunk. In 2012, Celonis joined the SAP Startup Focus program, an accelerator for analytics startups building new applications on the SAP HANA platform.

In July 2015, Celonis signed a reseller agreement with SAP. Celonis has since been offered by SAP as Celonis Process Mining by SAP. Celonis was the first company from the SAP Startup Focus program to sign a reseller agreement with SAP.

=== Funding ===
In June 2016, Celonis received $27.5m in series A funding led by 83North and Accel.

In June 2018, Celonis received a further $50m in series B funding at a valuation of $1bn. The funding round was led by 83North and Accel.

In November 2019, Celonis closed $290m in series C funding at a valuation of $2.5bn.

In June 2021, Celonis raised a $1bn series D investment at $11bn valuation, becoming New York's and Germany's most valuable startup as per Forbes.

In August 2022, it is announced that Qatar's sovereign wealth fund Qatar Investment Authority has joined Celonis as the leader of the US$400 million Series-D expansion, which was already completed in June 2021, in the amount of US$1 billion, bringing the company's valuation to around US$13 billion.

As of 2026, the company had raised a total of approximately $1.77 billion in funding and was valued at an estimated $11–13 billion.

=== Acquisitions ===
In April 2019, Celonis bought the Belgian software company Banyas for an undisclosed amount. Banyas technology was integrated into the Celonis platform to enable real-time connectivity to SAP.

In October 2020, Celonis acquired Czech software startup Integromat.com for "over $100M". Integromat, which has since changed its name to Make, sells an integration platform (iPaaS).

In October 2021, Celonis acquired Lenses.io, a London/Athens-based software company with over 100 employees that specializes in real-time streaming data tools.

In March 2022, Celonis acquired the Darmstadt-headquartered Process Analytics Factory GmbH (PAF), a company that provides process mining insights within the Microsoft Power Platform, for $100 million.

In 2025, Celonis debuted at No. 3 on the Fortune Future 50 list, recognized among the world's most promising companies poised for long-term growth.

== Products ==
In October 2020, Celonis launched its Execution Management System (EMS), a process analysis tool.
