= Builder.ai =

Defunct app development company

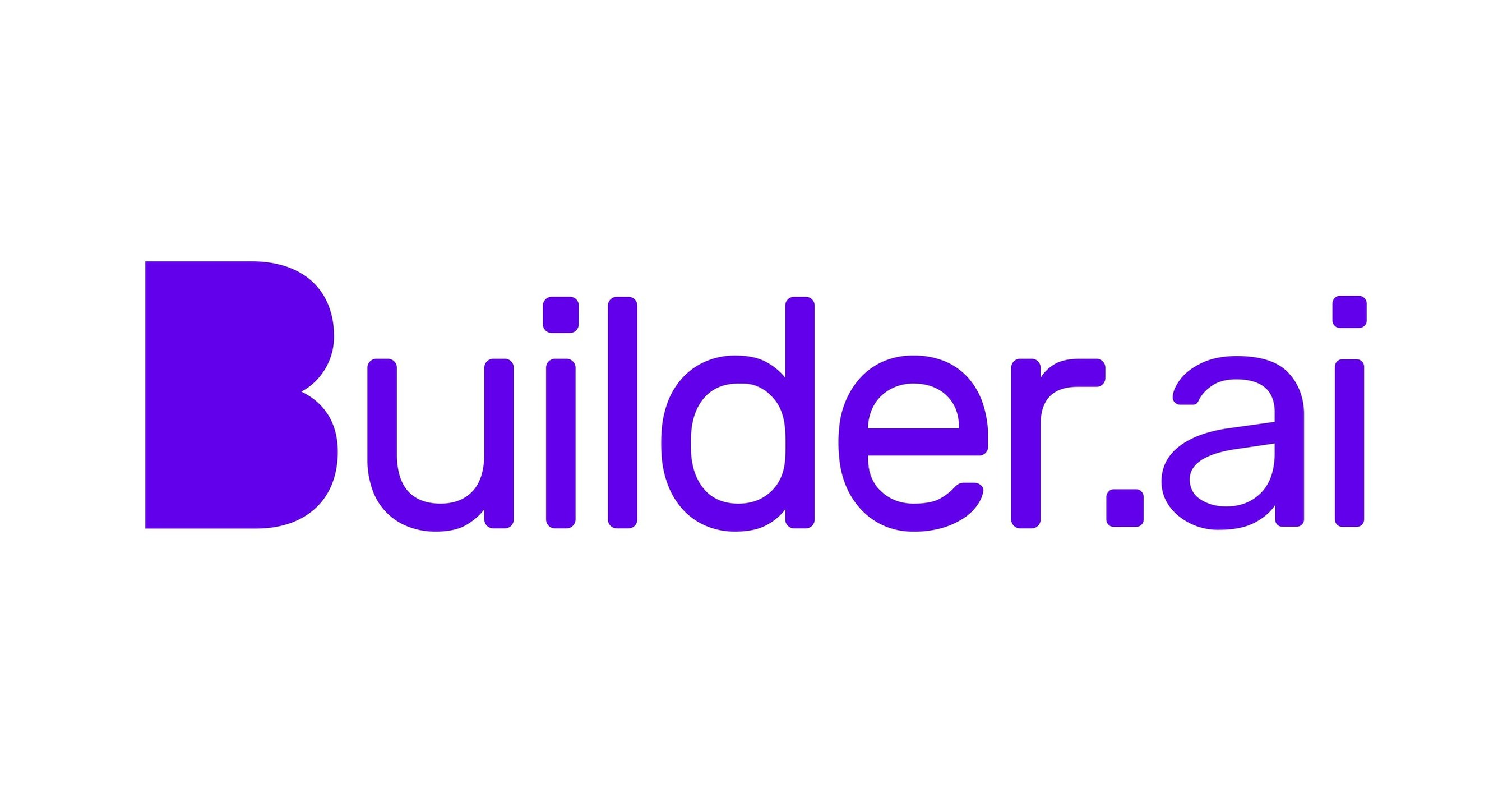
- Formerly: Engineer.ai
- Type: Private
- Industry: Software development Artificial intelligence
- Founded: 2016; 10 years ago
- Founder: Sachin Dev Duggal
- Defunct: May 2025
- Fate: Bankruptcy
- Headquarters: London, United Kingdom
- Key people: Sachin Dev Duggal (CEO, 2016–2025); Manpreet Ratia (CEO, 2025)
- Products: Mobile app development Web development
- Website: builder.ai

Builder.ai (formerly Engineer.ai Corporation) was a smartphone application development company that claimed to use AI to massively speed up app development. The company was based mostly in the United Kingdom and the United States, with smaller subsidiaries in Singapore and India. After years of allegations that it had exaggerated its AI capabilities (instead relying on outsourced human contractors) and misreported its financials, the company entered insolvency proceedings in 2025.

== History ==
The company was founded in 2016 by Sachin Dev Duggal after splitting from an earlier company. Although his friend Saurabh Dhoot was initially listed as a co-founder, the company later stated that he was not involved in its founding. Both Dhoot and Duggal have faced criminal probes relating to their previous business venture under Videocon. Dhoot served as a board member of Builder.ai from 2018 to 2022. It advertised itself as making website or app creation “as easy as ordering pizza”.

In 2018, the company announced that it had raised a Series A investment of $29.5 million. Near the end of 2018, it hired Robert Holdheim, an American executive, to run the business; he filed a lawsuit in February 2019 against the company and Duggal, saying he had been unjustly fired for pointing out problems and calling the company "smoke and mirrors". In August 2019, The Wall Street Journal reported that Engineer.ai (as it was then known) used human engineers rather than AI for most of its coding work, contradicting the company's marketing claims about its AI-powered development process.

In 2023, the company received $230 million in a funding round by investors, including Microsoft, Insight Partners, Softbank and Qatar Investment Authority. Microsoft planned to integrate Builder.ai technology with its Azure software. Fast Company magazine ranked the company as the third most innovative in A.I.

=== Collapse and bankruptcy ===
In May 2025, Bloomberg News accused Builder.ai and another Indian company VerSe of using round-tripping—a practice by which a company sells then buys back an asset for the same price—to inflate revenue data between 2021 and 2024. VerSe has denied such claims, while Builder.ai declined to comment. Another report alleged the company sometimes inflated sales figures by more than 20%. In mid-2024, the company decreased its revenue prediction for the latter half of 2024 by 25%. In 2025, the company hired auditors to verify post-2023 financials.

On 27 February 2025, it was announced that Sachin Dev Duggal had resigned as CEO, while keeping his board position and the title “chief wizard”. Manpreet Ratia was appointed as the CEO. The company then reduced its board from nine seats to five and requested that Duggal give up four of the five seats he previously held. On 20 May, Ratia told his employees in an internal call that funds had run dry and the company would enter bankruptcy proceedings.

In May 2025, Builder.ai announced insolvency proceedings after creditors seized $50 million borrowed in October 2024. In response to the company's high debt and low cash balances, some shareholders provided $75 million to the company, with Duggal seeking a deal with investors to buy back the company. By June, the company had laid off 80% of its workforce, or around 1,000 people.

== See also ==
- Your AI Slop Bores Me – A website where users assume the role of large language model chatbots
