= Lindsay Falvey =

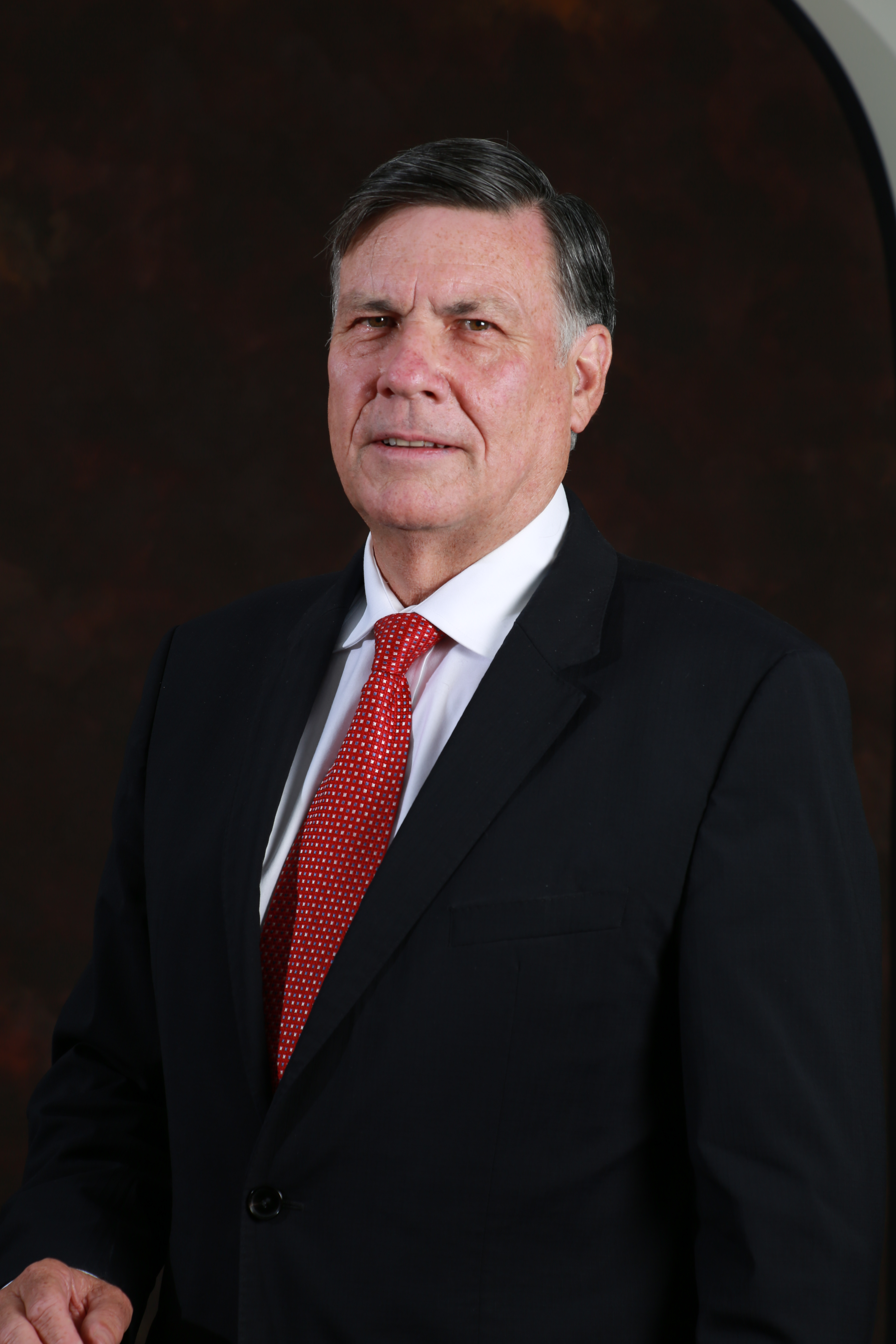
- Born: John Lindsay Falvey; 23 May 1950 (age 76); Melbourne, Australia
- Education: La Trobe University (BAgrSc, MAgrSc); University of Queensland (PhD); University of Melbourne (DAgrSc)
- Known for: Agricultural science in philosophy, international livestock development, integration of religion and agriculture
- Awards: Centenary Medal (2003); Fellow of the Australian Academy of Technological Sciences and Engineering (FTSE)
- Scientific career
- Fields: Agricultural science, international development, supramolecular chemistry
- Workplaces: University of Melbourne; International Livestock Research Institute (ILRI)

John Lindsay Falvey (born 23 May 1950) is an Australian-born international research and development (R&D) specialist and writes on topics concerning agricultural science and philosophy, religion, international development and spiritual development. He has been chair of the Board of Trustees the CGIAR Consortium member, the International Livestock Research Institute from 2013, and is a life member of Clare Hall at the University of Cambridge. He continues as an Honorary Professor, having retired as a professor at the University of Melbourne where he was Chair of Agriculture, Dean of Land and Food Resources and Dean of Agriculture, Forestry and Horticulture.

Falvey is a recipient of national and international awards, has three doctorates [PhD (University of Queensland), D. Agr. Sc. (University of Melbourne), D. Agr. Techn. (honoris causa, Thaksin University)] reflecting his work in Asia and Australia, is a recipient of the Australian Centenary Medal, and is a Fellow of the Australian Academy of Technological Sciences and Engineering (FTSE).

== Personal life ==
Falvey was born in Melbourne, Australia to Kenneth Robert Leslie Falvey and Dorothy Elizabeth Falvey (née Christopher). He has one brother Russell Leslie Falvey. He attended Deepdene State School and Balwyn High School, La Trobe University and the University of Queensland. From 1971 to 2002, Falvey was married to Janice Patricia Daly; they have two sons, Leslie Kenneth Falvey and Christopher John Falvey. In March 2006 he married Simone Lucie Behr (Bernhardt), an Alsatian ethnologist of the Council of Europe.

== Biography ==
During his initial degree, he took various in-term and vacation jobs, including labouring and mustering cattle at Douglas-Daly Experiment Station in the Northern Territory of Australia, while also taking a Methodist Local Preaching qualification with The Reverend Dr. A. Harold Wood at Deepdene Methodist Church. He worked for the Federal Government in Darwin, from where he conducted research and other work on the Douglas-Daly Experiment Station for five years. Disrupted by Cyclone Tracy on Christmas Eve 1974, Falvey entered international development suited to his perceived vocation of research into farmers raising livestock as an alternative to growing opium in the northern Thailand highlands. This research uncovered a primary sodium deficiency through much of the region. After five years Falvey joined a small commercial cooperative delivering international aid for rural development which became known as MPW Australia, of which he soon became managing director. With contributions from his professional colleagues, MPW grew into a sizeable consulting company which was eventually purchased by the Australian Securities Exchange listed Coffey International to become Coffey-MPW, of which he was Managing Director until 1993. During this consulting period, he maintained an active academic interest and published regularly in scientific journals, while also working in some 20 countries. His first books, on Cattle ... in northern Thailand and Working Animals were published in this period.

In 1995, he was invited by the University of Melbourne to the role of Dean of a combined faculty over eight campuses with the task of merging the six colleges of the Victorian College of Agriculture and Horticulture with the university's departments related to agriculture and forestry. This "merger" was more of a takeover, and only the Burnley and Dookie campus remained with the university in 2021, with the other campuses being moved to the TAFE sector fairly rapidly after the merger. The merger period was a brutal period for former VCAH staff, with many long-serving staff having their employment terminated because they did not fit the university teaching-research ideal. Many staff felt as if they had been sold-out by VCAH management.

After completing the merger, he stepped down as Dean while retaining the Chair of Agriculture. Falvey was awarded a doctorate of agricultural science by the University of Melbourne in 2004 for a 1,500-page combined selection from his books and papers which revealed a new evolving philosophy of international agricultural development over some thirty years.

He is a Foundation Director of Hassad Australia, Board Chair of the International Livestock Research Institute, Chair of the Selection Panel for the World Prize in International Integrated Development, and assists Thaksin University in Songkhla, Thailand.

His contributions in Thailand have been summarized as สิ่งพิมพ์ของ ศาสตราจารย์ ดร. ลินด์ซีย์ ฟาลวีย์

== Publications ==
20 books:

- Lindsay Falvey (2011) Re-Cultivating Agricultural Science, or What I’ve Learned in 40 Years of Professional Life. Pp139. Institute for International Development.
- Lindsay Falvey (2010) Small Farmers Secure Food: Survival Food Security, the World's Kitchen and the Critical Role of Small Farmers. Pp 232. Thaksin University Press in association with the Institute for International Development.
- Lindsay Falvey (2010) An open letter to Lindsay at 60: Five Cycles of Lindsay Falvey. Pp45.
- Lindsay Falvey (2010) Buddhist – Christian Dialogue: Four Papers from The Parliament of the World's Religions, 2–9 December, Melbourne, Australia, Pp45 (with John May, Vincent Pizzuto & Padmasiri de Silva), University Press
- Lindsay Falvey (2009) Dharma as Man: A Myth of Jesus in Buddhist Lands. Pp250. University Press, Australia
- Lindsay Falvey (2009) Pranja Anthology (The Book of Ecclesisates rendered into Buddhist concepts in rhyming couplets). Pp38
- Lindsay Falvey (2007) Reaching the Top? All Paths are True on the Right Mountain. Pp68. University Press.
- Lindsay Falvey (2005) Religion and Agriculture: Sustainability in Christianity and Buddhism. Institute for International Development, Silkworm Books. ISBN 0-9751000-2-5 PDF
- Lindsay Falvey (2004) Sustainability: Elusive or Illusory? Wise Environmental Intervention. Institute for International Development. ISBN 0-9751000-1-7 PDF
- Lindsay Falvey (2002) The Buddha's Gospel: A Buddhist Interpretation of Jesus' Words. Institute for International 108pp. ISBN 0-646-42071-2
- Lindsay Falvey (2000) Thai Agriculture: Golden Cradle of Millennia. Kasetsart University Press, White Lotus, Bangkok. ISBN 974-553-816-7. Translated into the Thai language as Karn Kaset Thai in 2005
- Charan Chantalakhana, Lindsay Falvey. Smallholder Dairying in the Tropics. International Livestock Research Institute, Nairobi, Kenya. ISBN 0-7340-1432-5
- Barrie Bardsley, Lindsay Falvey, (1997) Land and Food: Agricultural and Related Education in the Victorian Colleges and the University of Melbourne Institute of Land and Food Resources, University of Melbourne. ISBN 0-7325-1556-4
- Lindsay Falvey (1996) Food Environmental Education: Agricultural Education in Natural Resource Management. The Crawford Fund and the Institute for International Development.
- Lindsay Falvey (1994) International Consulting: Providing Services to International Development Agencies. Institute for International Development, Melbourne.
- Lindsay Falvey (1988) Introduction to Working Animals. Falvey Consulting, Melbourne. ISBN 1-86252-992-2
- Lindsay Falvey (1979) Cattle and Sheep in Northern Thailand. Tiphanetr Press, Thailand.
