= Douglas-Daly Experiment Station =

Douglas-Daly Research Farm
- Established: 1965
- Field of research: Agriculture
- Location: 725 Jungwa Road, Douglas-Daly, Northern Territory, 0822, Australia; 13°50′04″S 131°10′59″E
- Operating agency: Department of Primary Industry and Resources; Northern Territory Government
- Location within Northern Territory

The Douglas-Daly Experiment Station was an extensive research site of the Northern Territory Administration (NTA) of the Government of Australia and, after statehood, of the Northern Territory Government. It formed part of a string of similar research sites in northern Australia. Located at the junction of the Douglas and Daly Rivers and covering an area of approximately 100 km^{2}, the site spanned three major soil types of the Top End of the Northern Territory — Blain, Tippera and Florina soil types.

The climate is hot-humid tropical with a distinct six-month dry season and an annual rainfall of around 1 m. It was used mainly for pasture, forage, and grazing experiments, with its main research activity beginning in the 1960s and continuing until the break-up of the site into development farms in the 1980s.

Research from the site is mainly documented in scientific journal papers and annals of the NTA. Among the researchers on the site have been Bruce Franks, John Sturtz, John Austin and Lindsay Falvey, who were supported by the manager Heinz Mollman. The site was also used by CSIRO, especially for the rock-phosphate research of Ray Swaby.

== Douglas Daly School ==
The research farm has hosted a primary school for the children of farm employees and local residents since 1982. In 2018, the school, which is operated by the Northern Territory Government, had a total enrolment of 12 students and a teaching staff of three.

== Weather station ==
The Douglas-Daly Research Farm has been the site of an official weather station since January 1968.

Climate data for Douglas River Research Farm (sic), Douglas-Daly, Northern Territory
Month	Jan	Feb	Mar	Apr	May	Jun	Jul	Aug	Sep	Oct	Nov	Dec	Year
Mean daily maximum °C (°F)	33.7 (92.7)	33.5 (92.3)	34.0 (93.2)	34.7 (94.5)	33.3 (91.9)	31.4 (88.5)	31.9 (89.4)	33.6 (92.5)	36.8 (98.2)	37.8 (100.0)	36.9 (98.4)	35.0 (95.0)	34.4 (93.9)
Mean daily minimum °C (°F)	23.9 (75.0)	23.7 (74.7)	23.2 (73.8)	20.5 (68.9)	16.7 (62.1)	13.7 (56.7)	12.9 (55.2)	14.0 (57.2)	18.6 (65.5)	22.3 (72.1)	23.6 (74.5)	23.8 (74.8)	19.7 (67.5)
Average rainfall mm (inches)	290.0 (11.42)	283.2 (11.15)	226.0 (8.90)	49.9 (1.96)	9.9 (0.39)	2.0 (0.08)	2.4 (0.09)	1.2 (0.05)	5.2 (0.20)	35.8 (1.41)	124.8 (4.91)	214.5 (8.44)	1,245.8 (49.05)
Average rainy days	14.4	13.3	11.2	3.2	0.9	0.1	0.2	0.2	0.7	3.1	7.9	11.0	66.2
