= Ministry of Commerce and Industry (Qatar) =

Government ministry of Qatar

Agency overview
- Agency executive: Faisal bin Thani bin Faisal Al Thani, Minister

The Ministry of Commerce and Industry - MOCI (Arabic: وزارة التجارة والصناعة), is responsible for the regulation of trade and industrial activities in Qatar. Its scope is to ensure fair trade and competition and restrict fraudulent and monopolistic activities.

The current minister is Faisal bin Thani bin Faisal Al Thani, who was appointed in November 2024.

== History ==
In November 2018, during a cabinet reshuffle, Tamim bin Hamad Al Thani, the Emir of Qatar, appointed Ali bin Ahmed Al Kuwari, then the chief executive of Qatar National Bank, as Minister of Commerce and Industry. The appointment placed both commerce and industry under the authority of a single minister. In 2019, the Ministry of Commerce and Industry replaced the former Ministry of Economy and Commerce as part of a government restructuring. The vision of the ministry is to reach "a diversified economic landscape and self-reliant private sector within a competitive business environment aware of consumer rights as well as the responsibilities and obligations of the business community towards them." In October 2021, following a cabinet reshuffle, Sheikh Mohammed bin Hamad Al Thani succeeded Al Kuwari as Minister of Commerce and Industry, with Al Kuwari becoming Minister of Finance. In November 2024, Faisal bin Thani bin Faisal Al Thani was appointed as minister. In January 2025, the ministry launched its 2024-2030 Strategy, which was developed alongside the Qatar National Manufacturing Strategy for the same period. Both strategies focus on economic diversification and the development of the manufacturing sector, as well as encouraging private-sector participation and attracting foreign investment.

== Departments ==
The ministry is divided into departments. Each is managed by an executive.

=== Minister ===
- Minister Office

The Minister Office handles the schedule of the minister and organizes communication between the minister and other parties. It is tasked with ensuring the administration and implementation of the minister's orders.

- Internal Audit Department

The internal audit is responsible for the internal validity of the ministry by ensuring the legality of all procedures and conducts. It also oversees documentation and human resources.

- Public Relations and Communications Department

The department manages the public relations with the ministry. It provides information to the public and replies to inquiries. Statements and replies to the media are drafted in the department.

=== Deputy ===
- Financial and Administrative Affairs

Responsible for the management of revenue, expenditures, and fees of the ministry, as well as documentation. It is in charge of managing and carrying out administrative proceedings. Head: Nasser bin Muhammad Al-Muhannadi

- Human Resources

Responsible for providing adequate workforce to the ministry. Head: Abdulrahman Mohsen Al-Yafei

- Information Technology Department

The IT department is responsible for providing and maintaining all the computer-based systems of the ministry. Head: Mashael Ali Al-Hammadi

=== Assistant Deputy of Consumer Affairs ===
Departments under the assistant deputy of consumer affairs are mainly concerned with licensing permits and consumer protection from commercial fraud and monopolies.

- Quality license and market control
- Department of Supply and Strategic Inventory
- The Consumer Protection and Combating Commercial Fraud
- The Competition Protection Department

=== Assistant Deputy of Commerce Affairs ===
- Intellectual Property Rights Protection Department

Departments under the commerce affairs are mainly responsible for matters relating to copyright and intellectual property. The following departments are also under the assistant deputy of commerce affairs:

- The Commercial Registration and Licenses Department
- Companies Affairs Department

Company formation in Qatar, the MCI requires a 51% local Qatari sponsor and mandatory office space with a flexi-desk as a minimum.

The MCI is dedicated towards companies requiring trading activities, office space availability anywhere inside Qatar, specific business activities that require external approvals (such as taxi services, as an example), organizing of work with banking & government sectors etc.

== The National Committee on Trade ==
In accordance with Cabinet Resolution No. (4), the National Committee on Trade was established in 2001. The primary goal of the committee is to work in tandem with the public and private sectors to optimize the advantages of the State of Qatar's WTO membership in a way that advances Qatar's goals for sustainable development.

=== Committee's vision ===
The Committee aims to optimize the advantages of Qatar's WTO membership by endorsing state programs and initiatives and promoting awareness among diverse economic sectors to bolster the growth of the Qatari economy. With a clear strategy that guarantees the highest levels of sustainability in accordance with the tenets of the Qatar National Vision 2030, the Committee is carrying out its objective.

Taking the necessary steps to help Qatari businessmen take full advantage of the WTO agreement; educating businessmen about their rights under the WTO agreement; advising them on how to conduct business in a way that does not violate the state's obligations under the WTO; and setting up suitable channels of communication between the Committee and other government bodies to educate them on WTO-related matters are all part of the Committee's work plan for the period of April 1, 2010, to March 31, 2011. Aside from overseeing sector-specific studies carried out by the Ministry of Economy and Commerce, the Committee's work plan calls for the effective participation of the ministry in negotiations over the trade facilitation agreement, the drafting of proposals to improve commercial policies, and the provision of technical support to enhance the performance of employees at ministries and other government bodies.

== Industrial strategy ==
The Qatar National Manufacturing Strategy 2024-2030 aims to diversify and strengthen the country's manufacturing sector. It includes 15 initiatives and 60 development projects focused on industrial diversification, advanced manufacturing, innovation, sustainability, and workforce development. By 2030, the strategy targets increasing manufacturing value added to QR70.5 billion, non-hydrocarbon exports to QR49 billion, and annual industrial investment to QR2.75 billion.
