= Ali bin Ahmed al-Kuwari =

Qatari politician

His Excellency Ali bin Ahmed al-Kuwari
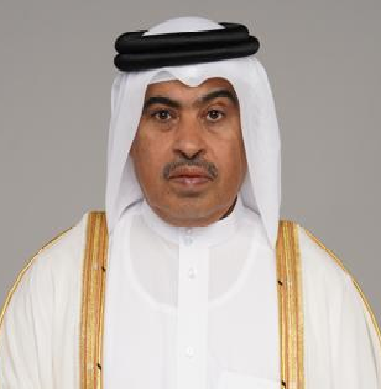

Minister of Finance
- Incumbent
- Assumed office October 2021
- Monarch: Tamim bin Hamad Al Thani
- Prime Minister: Abdullah bin Nasser Al Thani Khalid bin Khalifa bin Abdul Aziz Al Thani
- Preceded by: Ali Sharif Al Emadi

Minister of Commerce and Industry
- In office November 2018 – October 2021
- Monarch: Tamim bin Hamad Al Thani
- Prime Minister: Mohammed bin Abdulrahman Al Thani
- Preceded by: Ahmed bin Jassim Al Thani
- Succeeded by: Mohammed bin Hamad bin Qassim Al Abdullah Al Thani

Personal details
- Education: Eastern Washington University (B.Sc.); Seattle Pacific University (MSIS)

Ali bin Ahmed al-Kuwari is a Qatari politician who has served as Minister of Finance since October 2021. Previously he served as Minister of Commerce and Industry from November 2018 to October 2021 and acting Minister of Finance from May to October 2021.

== Education ==
Al-Kuwari holds a Bachelor of Mathematics and Computer Science from Eastern Washington University and a Master of Science in Management Information Systems from the Seattle Pacific University. He attended various Executive Programs at the Wharton School of Business, the London Business School, Cambridge University and Duke University.

== Career ==
Before joining Qatar National Bank in 1988, al-Kuwari worked at Qatar Petroleum for four years. At QNB, he was executive general manager and group chief business officer of QNB. On 9 July 2013, Al Kuwari became the CEO of QNB Group.

In November 2018, al-Kuwari was appointed minister of commerce and industry. In 2019, he became Chair of the Advisory Board of the newly established Investment Promotion Agency.

In May 2021, he became acting minister of finance, succeeding Ali Sharif Al Emadi. Since October 2021, al-Kuwari has been the minister of finance.

In January 2023, al-Kuwari attended the World Economic Forum in Davos, where he announced Qatar would "very soon" be ready to sell its first green bond. Additionally, the World Economic Forum signed a partnership agreement with Qatar to establish a Center for the Fourth Industrial Revolution (C4IR) in Qatar.

Al-Kuwari chairs the MasterCard Middle East and North Africa Advisory Board. He is also chairman of QNB Capital and of QNB Privée Suisse in Switzerland as well as vice chairman of Qatar Exchange.

Al-Kuwari serves as Qatar's Governor at the Arab Monetary Fund.
