= Abdulla bin Mohammed Al Thani =

Qatari businessman and politician

His Excellency Abdulla bin Mohammed bin Saud Al Thani
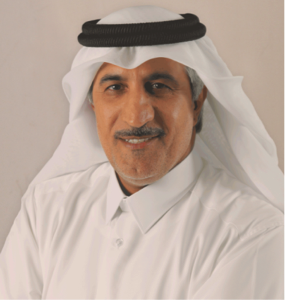
- Education: Command and General Staff College (Egypt), United States Army War College
- Occupations: Qatar's Ambassador to the United Kingdom and Northern Ireland. Previously, Qatar's Ambassador to Germany, Minister of State and former Chairman of the Board of Directors of Ooredoo Group and CEO of QIA

Sheikh Abdulla bin Mohammed bin Saud Al Thani (Arabic: عبد الله بن محمد بن سعود آل ثاني) is a Qatari diplomat. He was appointed as the Qatari Ambassador Extraordinary and Plenipotentiary to the United Kingdom and Northern Ireland in June 2024. Previously, He served as Ambassador to Germany from August 2020.

HE Sheikh Abdulla was a Minister of State and former chairman of the board of directors of Ooredoo Group, a position he has held since 2000. He is a member of the Supreme Council for Economic Affairs and Investment and is on the Advisory Board of the World Economic Forum Gender Parity Programme.

== Career ==
Al Thani was instrumental in the restructuring and regional expansion of Ooredoo, steering the growth of Ooredoo from a single-nation telecom operator to a Group with a presence in 10 countries spanning North Africa, Middle East and South East Asia.

During that time he was Chairman of Ooredoo Kuwait and served as President Commissioner of Indosat Ooredoo.

He also served on the ITU Broadband Commission for Digital Development and was a member of the World Bank Group Advisory Council for Gender and Development.

Al Thani was Chief Executive Officer of Qatar Investment Authority, from 2014 to 2018, taking the helm of one of the world’s largest sovereign wealth funds where he played a major role in steering the sovereign wealth fund towards focusing on diversifying its portfolio and increasing its exposure to the United States and Asia.

During his tenure at the Qatar Investment Authority, he also served on the boards of QNB Group, Harrods, and the Sovereign Wealth Fund Institute.

Prior to joining Ooredoo, Al Thani was Chief of the Royal Court (Amiri Diwan of the State of Qatar) and member of the Planning Council from 2000 to 2005. He also was the founding chairman of the board of trustees for the North Atlantic College in Qatar from 2001 to 2006 and Military Attache to the United Kingdom from 1990 to 2000.

Al Thani is a graduated pilot from the British Army Air Corps as well as a certified pilot instructor by way of the British Royal Air Force. With an extensive background in both the military and aviation, he has previously served Qatar's Emiri Air Force. Al Thani holds a master's degree and has completed a number of programs at various military institutions, among them the United States Army War College. HE, has been awarded the medal of friendship from president Vladimir Putin.>"Putin Award". Arabian Business. 11 April 2017.
