= Qatar Financial Centre =

- Company type: Public
- Industry: Financial and legal services
- Founded: 2005
- Headquarters: Qatar
- Key people: Sheikh Faisal bin Thani bin Faisal Al Thani (chairman); Mansoor Rached al khater (CEO)
- Website: www.qfc.qa/en

The Qatar Financial Centre (QFC) is a business and financial centre located in Doha, Qatar, providing legal and regulatory services for local and international companies. Established in March 2005, it advances the Qatari government’s economic policy and contributes to the country's economic diversification and development plans, attracting investment by offering a favorable legal, regulatory, tax and business environment. Much like the Dubai International Financial Centre, the Abu Dhabi Global Market, and the Astana International Financial Centre, its legal system is based on English common law, in contrast to the civilian and Sharia legal system in the state of Qatar.

QFC is supported by affiliated organizations that provide its clients a business-friendly ecosystem. The Qatar Financial Centre Regulatory Authority (QFCRA) serves as its financial regulator, while the Qatar International Court and Dispute Resolution Centre (QICDRC) provides a judicial system consisting of a Civil and Commercial Court and a Regulatory Tribunal.

To help reduce Qatar’s reliance on the petroleum industry, QFC promotes growth in the four focus sectors of digital, media, sports and financial services.

Apart from Qatar itself, which is working to raise the capacity of its financial services to support more than $200 billion worth of infrastructure projects, the QFC also provides a conduit for financial services providers to access nearly $1 trillion of investment across the GCC over the next decade.

== See also ==
- Economy of Qatar
