= Union of Arab Banks =

Union of Arab Banks (UAB) is an organization responsible for fostering cooperation between Arab banks, developing of Arab financial business, and enhancing the financing role of Arab banks in the Arab World. The Union of Arab Banks was formed on March 13, 1974, during a meeting of an elite group of Arab banks and management leaders under the umbrella of the Arab Administrative Development Organization. The meeting reached a conclusion to establish an Arab organization working within the framework of the unions emanated from the Arab League..

The headquarters of the Union is located in the Central District of Beirut, Lebanon and has three major regional offices in Egypt, Sudan and Jordan. This besides a network of strategic relations with major banking and financial institutions in other Arab countries where the Union provides various types of services for domestic banking sectors.

The ultimate objectives of UAB are to consolidate relations and foster cooperation between its members, to coordinate their activities, and to emphasize their Arab identity to secure common interests. This besides the development of the banking and financial sector in the Arab countries, and enhancing the role of the Arab banking and financial institutions in supporting the social and economic development in the Arab region. The Union is seeking to be the main and true support for the Arab common economic practice, and the corner stone in the process of building and developing banking cooperation for the benefit of economic, financial, and banking development in the Arab world. The current chairman of the Union of Arab Banks is Mr. Mohammed Mahmoud Ahmed El – Etreby.

== Membership ==
The Union of Arab Banks comprises today more than (300) Arab financial and banking institutions representing the major and biggest Arab banks. This makes the Union the largest banking and financial consortium in the region and an efficient representative of the Arab banking community. The members of the Union consist of two categories: The First category combines active members and includes all Arab banking, financial, and investment institutions and joint Arab foreign banking institutions. And the second category combines observer members and includes Arab central banks, Arab banking associations and joint Arab-Foreign financial institutions in which the Arab share is less than 51% but more than 25%.

== UAB Bodies ==
The Union performs its functions through the following bodies:

- The General Assembly

Supreme authority of the Union resides with the General Assembly which comprises representatives of active and observer members. It formulates the general policies and plans of the Union and meets once every year.

- The Board of Directors

The board of directors is the Union's highest executive authority. It adopts policies and measures to attain the principal goals determined by the General Assembly. The Union's Board of directors consists of delegates representing Arab Countries having active members in the Union. Representatives of joint banks, Arab central banks and monitory agencies may also attend Board meetings as observers. The board members elect from themselves a chairman and a Vice Chairman by a simple majority vote of members present for a 3-year term of office.

- The General Secretariat

The General Secretariat is the technical and administrative body of the Union. It consists of the Secretary General, Assistant Secretaries and a component of technical and administrative personnel. the Secretary General manages the Union's affairs and implements the resolutions adopted by general Assemblies, the board of directors and executive committee.

== Services ==
Since its inception in the mid-seventies, the Union has acted as a pivotal referral entity for the whole Arab banking and financial community. It is considered as a reliable organization to provide information, research, and studies about the Arab financial sector. Such services include the following:

1. Response to specific requests for information and / or documentations
2. Comparative research and bibliographies
3. Comparative financial and banking legislation
4. Provision of experts for conferences, seminars, technical assistance
5. Organization of seminars and conferences
6. Publication of research papers
7. Consultations on legal, economic, banking, and financial cases and issues

== Other Activities ==
=== Seminars ===
The Union prepares and executes annual programs, which include banking seminars for banks’ staff. These seminars have become symbolic platforms for exchanging ideas and experiences between Arab banks officials about recent issues that are of extreme importance to the Arab financial business. These seminar programs have helped the Union position itself as a leading platform for coordinating training efforts in the Arab region as a whole, and for serving the interests of Arab training centers and institutes and the interests of the Arab banking sector in general.

=== Conferences ===
The Union is annually organizing top level banking and financial conventions which gather an elite group of economic, financial and banking leaders and experts from both Arab and foreign capitals, to discuss current issues crucial to the international and Arab economies, and adopt practical recommendations regarding sound banking practices. The Union provides via these international conferences opportunities for real contacts between Arab and international bankers on one hand, and on the other hand the Arab conferences provide a connection point for cooperation between Arab bankers. The annual conferences organized by the Union in Arab and international capitals have become a basic platform for promoting banking and economic relations between Arab bankers and with international banks.

=== Data Bank ===
The Arab Banking Data Bank was formed with the objective of being the main source for general information on Arab financial and banking institutions, and as well joint Arab-foreign institutions. The Data Bank is actively preparing reports and studies about all recent trends in all Arab banks, individual Arab banking sectors, and the Arab-banking sector in general. The objective is to position the Data Bank as the only and true referral center for publishing detailed reports on the development of Arab banking and financial institutions.

=== Publications ===
- Magazine

The Union plays a major role in raising the level of knowledge and education in economic and financial fields within the Arab regions, mainly through its specialized magazine in banking and financial affairs, “Ittihad Al Masaref Al Arabiya”, which is considered to be the official voice representing the Arab banking and financial society. The magazine is distinguished by its outstanding research and deep scientific studies about the latest developments in banking and finance. The magazine material is written by UAB's specialists in banking and finance and leading bankers from the Arab world.

- Books

The Union plays a major role in raising the level of knowledge and education in economic and financial fields within the Arab regions, mainly through its specialized magazine in banking and financial affairs, “Ittihad Al Masaref Al Arabiya”, which is considered to be the official voice representing the Arab banking and financial society. The magazine is distinguished by its outstanding research and deep scientific studies about the latest developments in banking and finance. The magazine material is written by UAB's specialists in banking and finance and leading bankers from the Arab world.
