= Ooredoo =

Qatari multinational telecommunications company

Ooredoo Q.P.S.C.

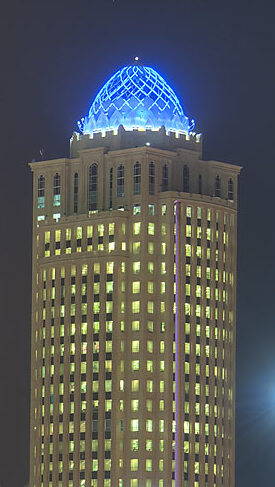
- Headquarters at Ooredoo Tower in Doha, Qatar
- Trade name: Ooredoo
- Formerly: Qatar Public Telecommunications Corporation (1987-1998); Qatar Telecom ("Qtel") Group (1998–2013)
- Type: Public
- Traded as: QE: ORDS; ADX: ORDS
- Industry: Telecommunications
- Founded: 1987; 39 years ago
- Founder: Government of Qatar
- Headquarters: Doha, Qatar
- Areas served: North Africa, Middle East, Europe and Asia
- Key people: Sh. Faisal bin Thani bin Faisal Al Thani (Chairman); Aziz Aluthman Fakhroo (CEO)
- Revenue: US$6.23bn (2022)
- Operating income: QAR 3,080,458,000 (2014)
- Net income: QAR 2,528,387,000 (2014)
- Total assets: QAR 97,999,347,000 (2014)
- Total equity: QAR 30,468,513,000 (2014)
- Number of employees: 15,167 (2021)
- Subsidiaries: see Subsidiaries
- Website: www.ooredoo.com

Ooredoo Q.P.S.C. (Note: Qatari Public Shareholding Company) (Arabic: أريد, romanized: Urīdu; formerly Qtel), is a Qatari state-owned multinational telecommunications company headquartered in Doha. Ooredoo provides mobile, wireless, wireline, and content services with market share in domestic and international telecommunication markets and in business (corporations and individuals) and residential markets.

Ooredoo was the first operator globally to launch commercial 5G services in Qatar and is one of the world's largest mobile telecommunications companies, with over 121 million customers worldwide as of 2021.

Ooredoo operates in nine countries and territories across the Middle East, North Africa, and Southeast Asia: Algeria, Indonesia, Iraq, Kuwait, Maldives, Oman, Palestine, Qatar and Tunisia.

Their shares are listed on the Qatar Stock Exchange and the Abu Dhabi Securities Exchange.

== History ==
The company was founded by the government of Qatar in Doha in 1987, initially as the 100% state-owned "Qatar Public Telecommunications Corporation". In 1998 it was transformed into "Qatar Telecom" ("Qtel"), and partially opened to private investment, but in a way that guaranteed continued majority control for the government. It has since become the largest communications operator in Qatar, offering new technologies to the country, including mobile, broadband, digital, and fiber internet services. The publicly traded company has ownership from the royal family, with H.E. Sheikh Abdulla bin Mohammed Bin Saud Al Thani as the company's chairman and Sheikh Saud bin Nasser Al Thani as Ooredoo Group CEO. Waleed Al-Sayed is Ooredoo Group's deputy CEO and Ooredoo Qatar's CEO.

Qtel Group and all its operating companies worldwide were officially unified under Ooredoo Group in February 2013, as part of the company's strategy to combine its assets to form a global business within the telecommunications industry. The name Ooredoo is Arabic for "I Want", chosen "to reflect the aspirations of Ooredoo customers and the core belief that Ooredoo can enrich people's lives and stimulate human growth in the communities where it operates".

Ooredoo transformed from a single market operator in Qatar to an international communications company with a global customer base of more than 114 million customers worldwide (as of September 2015) and consolidated revenues of QAR 24.2 billion for the first nine months of fiscal year 2015.

In 2010 the company upgraded its 3G network in the country and launched its Mobile Money service. By 2012, its network grew with its fiber network that provided services with download speeds of up to 100 Mbit/s, HDTV, and its initial phase of its 4G LTE mobile broadband service. The company's consumer base has grown significantly in recent times, from 1.9 million subscribers in 2008 to 2.5 million in 2012 within Qatar. Its annual revenues increased by QAR 3.5 billion from 2012 to 2013 in a single quarter.

As of 2013, the company unified under Ooredoo Group.

Ooredoo Group was ranked 33rd on Forbes Middle East's 2025 Top 100 Listed Companies.

== Current standing ==
Ooredoo became the first operator in the world to launch a live 5G network in May 2018. Ooredoo tested this technology since 2014. The 5G network had been commercially launched in Qatar and Kuwait.

In the 2010s, the company developed a partnership with Nokia in Qatar. In May 2016, the firm expanded this partnership with Nokia in a three-year deal to develop a nationwide mobile network in Qatar. The firm broadened its reach with its operations in over 16 countries across the Persian Gulf, Middle East, North Africa, and Asia regions.

The firm has since experienced significant growth with QAR 24.604 billion (US$6.76bn) in revenues in FY2025. Despite this, the amount of Ooredoo employees has shrunk in the past years, with only 11,547 employees in 2024 compared to over 15,000 in 2021, a decrease of more than 23%.

== Ownership ==
According to Ooredoo's 2022 disclosures, 68% of the company is owned by Qatar government-related entities (with 52% owned directly by the state and 17% owned by "other Qatari government related entities"), 10% is owned by ADIA (UAE), and the remaining 21% is on the public market.

== Operating companies ==
=== Middle East ===
==== Ooredoo Qatar ====
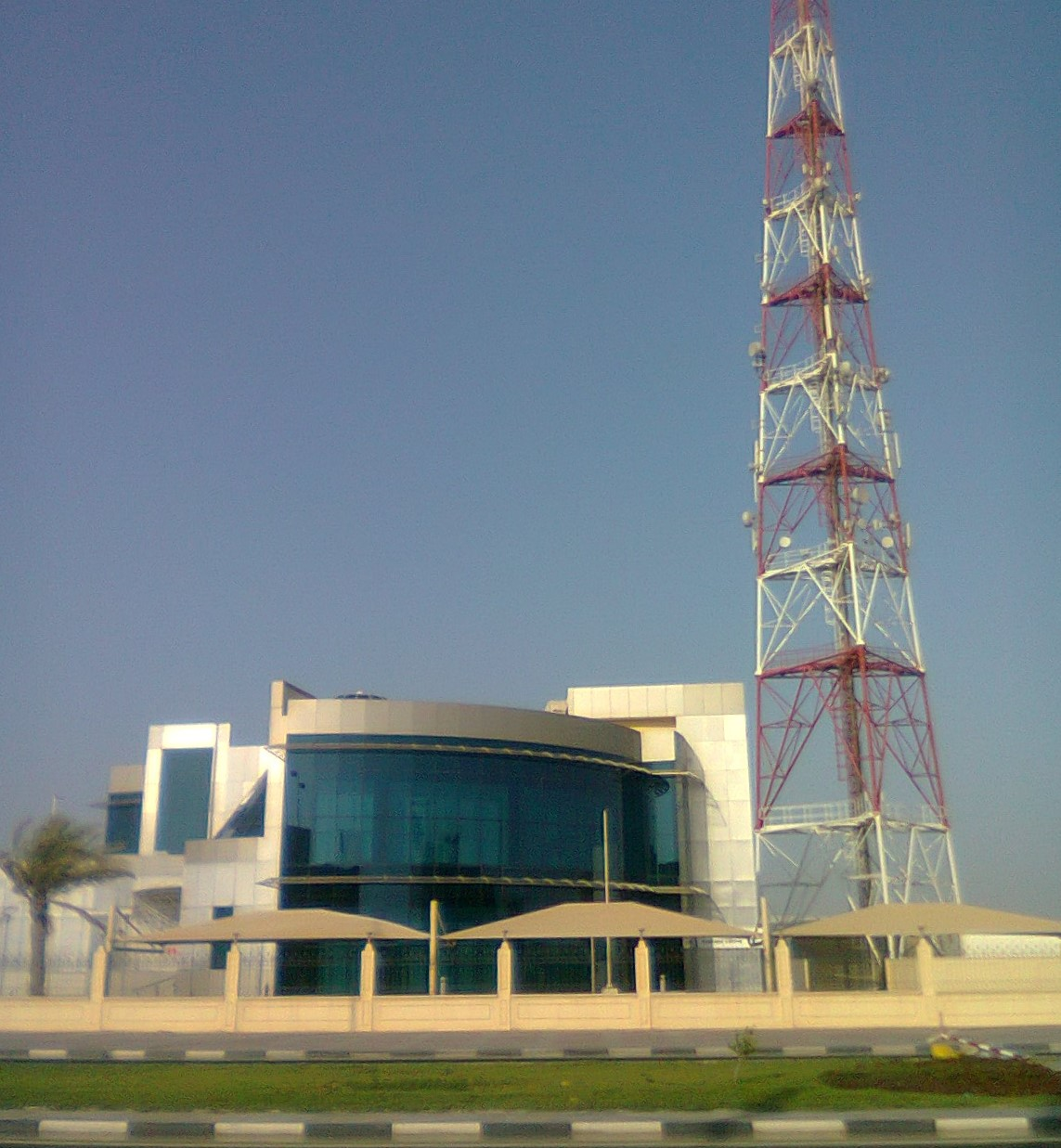
Ooredoo branch in Al Khor, Qatar

Qtel was formally established under Law No. 13 of 1987.

In 2006, Qtel launched 3G services and announced a series of initiatives, including an equity partnership with AT&T in NavLink, international high- speed mobile data (GPRS) roaming services, and the launch of IP (Internet Protocol) and telephony services.

In 2010, Qtel launched its Mobile Money service and upgraded its 3G network.

In 2012, Qtel continued its rollout of the nationwide Qtel Fibre network, offering packages with download speeds of up to 300 Mbit/s and HDTV + ooredoo TV. Qtel also began the trial phase of its 4G LTE mobile broadband service.

In February 2013, Qtel officially rebranded as Ooredoo.

In 2015, Ooredoo Qatar announced the launch of Ooredoo SuperNet in one of the most significant network evolution in Qatar's history. The company introduced three-band carrier aggregation, building on its position of being the first and only company to combine 20+10 MHz bands on its 4G+ network.

On July 7, 2017, at the beginning of the Qatar diplomatic crisis, Ooredoo changed its network name to Tamim Almajd in a show of solidarity with the Emir Sheikh Tamim bin Hamad Al Thani.

In January 2020, Ooredoo Qatar signed a partnership with Indian entertainment and media platform Eros Now, to make Eros Now's content available to its customers in Qatar.

On 30 September 2021, Ooredoo Group announced that the title of Qatar's first-ever Formula 1 race will be officially named as the Formula 1 Ooredoo Qatar Grand Prix. The announcement was made at a press conference at the Lusail International Circuit in the presence of the Deputy Group CEO and the CEO of Ooredoo Qatar Mr. Sheikh Mohammed Bin Abdulla Al Thani & other officials.

==== Ooredoo Oman ====
Ooredoo Oman was formerly known as Nawras, which was launched in Oman in 2004. The company has been listed on the Muscat Securities Market since 2010.

In November 2014, Nawras officially rebranded as Ooredoo Oman.

Ooredoo Oman provides landline voice services to business and residential customers. It also provides a range of prepaid and post-paid mobile phone plans, and broadband internet service, both home and mobile (3G+).

Ooredoo Oman has recently launched full-fledged home entertainment TV services - using set top boxes for home TV, and using apps for Android and iOS mobile devices. It is the first operator in the Middle East region to have launched TV services (including live TV channels and video on demand) from multiple content providers using completely Over The Top (OTT) technology - thus being able to offer its TV services not just for its own broadband and mobile customers, but to other competing operator subscribers too. Its TV content providers include StarzPlay, YuppTV, Alt Balaji, BluTV, Al Jazeera, EuroNews, FranceTV, ErosNow, FilmBox, Hopster, Spuul.

The home broadband and voice service is powered by WiMAX (Worldwide Interoperability for Microwave Access) technology. Ooredoo Oman was the first to deploy 3G+ in Oman and is the only operator to deploy WiMAX commercially in Oman.

==== Ooredoo Kuwait ====
Ooredoo Kuwait's operations began in December 1999 as Wataniya Telecom when it launched wireless services as the second operator in the country.

In March 2007, Ooredoo acquired Kuwait's Wataniya Telecom for US$3.8 billion.

In May 2014, Wataniya Telecom officially rebranded as Ooredoo Kuwait.

==== Asiacell (Ooredoo Iraq) ====
Asiacell, the first mobile telecommunications company in Iraq, was established in Sulaymaniyah in 1999.

In August 2007, Asiacell bid and won a 15-year national license, becoming the GSM telecom operator with the largest long-term network coverage in Iraq. To handle new business operations, Asiacell also simultaneously established new executive offices in Baghdad, Basra, and other major cities in Iraq.

==== Ooredoo Palestine ====
In 2017, Ooredoo began services in the Gaza Strip.

==== Ooredoo United Arab Emirates ====
On September 12, 2019, Ooredoo launched in the Emirates thanks to its joint communication and to make the UAE one of the most connected countries in the Gulf Cooperation Council region, despite the UAE's participation in the Qatar blockade. In August 2021, it changed its name to E-mobile and belongs to the VEON Group.

=== North Africa ===
==== Ooredoo Algeria ====
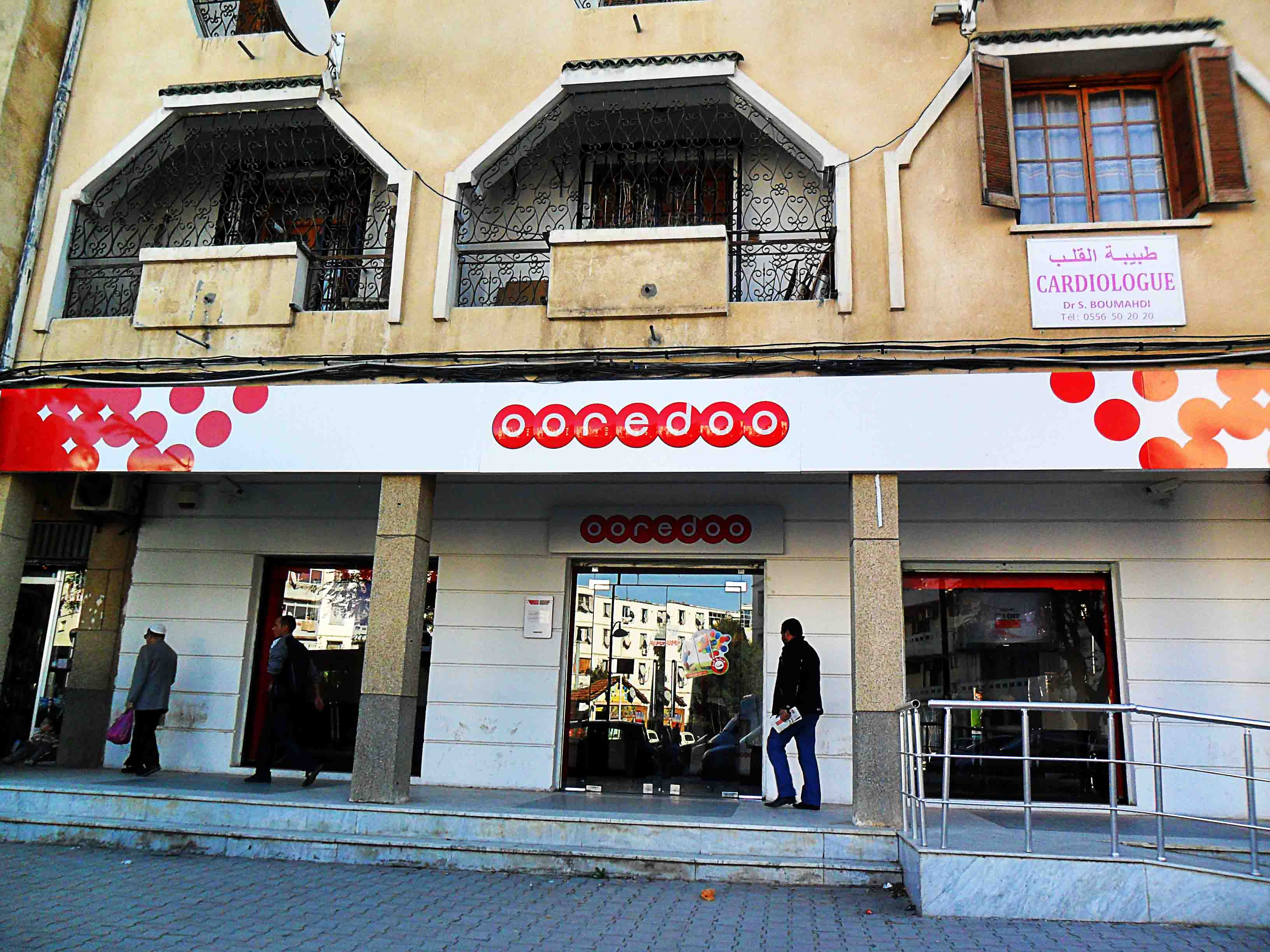
Ooredoo Algeria

Ooredoo Algeria's operations began in 2004 as Nedjma, positioned as the first multimedia operator in Algeria.

In November 2013, Nedjma officially rebranded as Ooredoo Algeria.

Ooredoo Algeria introduced the first EDGE network in the country in 2004 and launched 3G services in Algeria in December 2013.

==== Ooredoo Tunisia ====
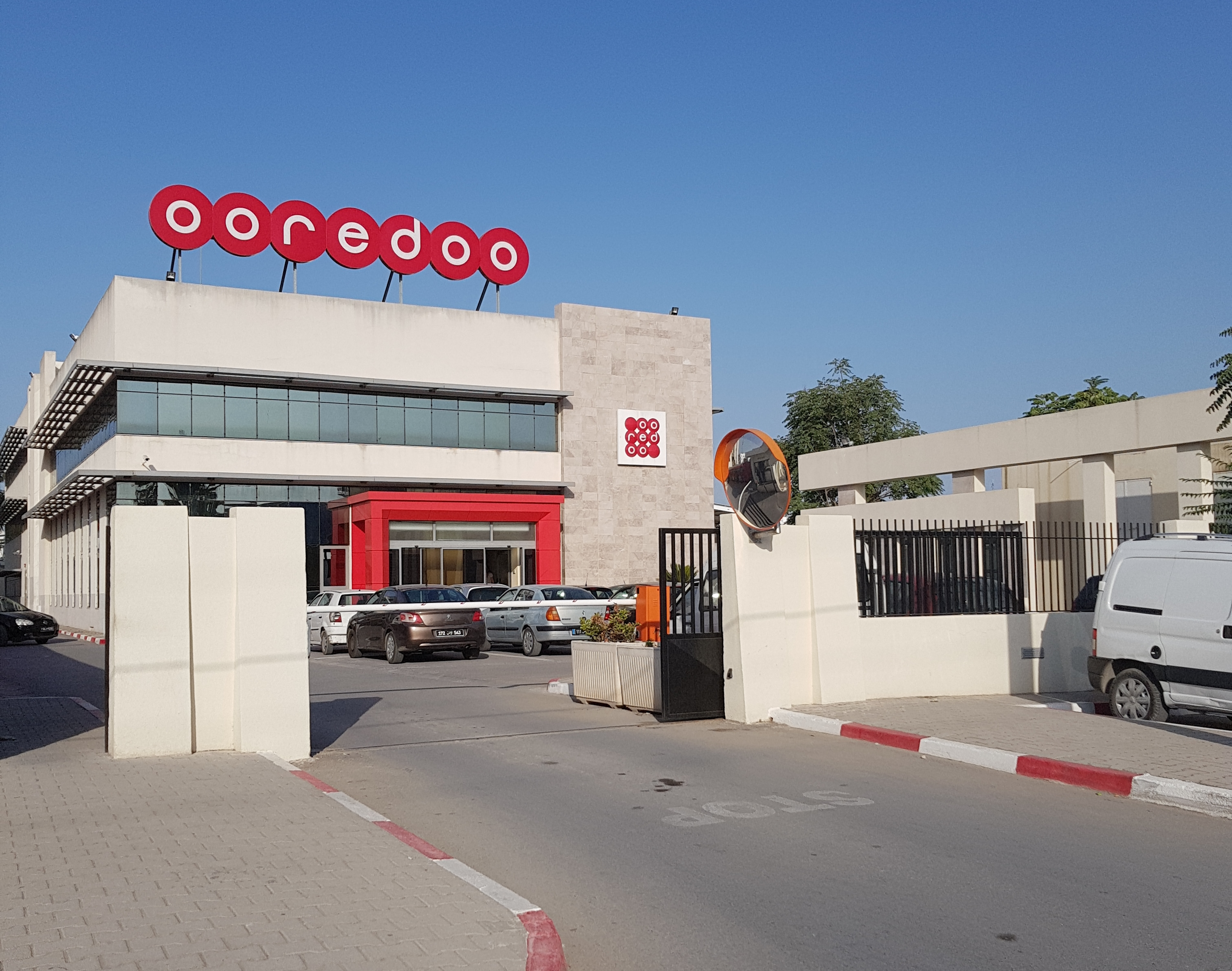
Ooredoo Tunisia

Ooredoo Tunisia was founded in May 2002 as Tunisiana and began commercial operations in December the same year.

In April 2014, Tunisiana officially rebranded as Ooredoo Tunisia.

=== South Asia ===
==== Ooredoo Maldives ====
Ooredoo Maldives' operations began in February 2005 as Wataniya Maldives, after it was selected during a competitive bidding process with three other companies.

In December 2013, Wataniya Telecom officially rebranded as Ooredoo Maldives.

=== Southeast Asia ===
==== Indosat Ooredoo Hutchison ====
Indosat was founded in 1967 and began as a commercial international telecommunications service provider (IDD) in September 1969. It is partially owned by the Indonesian government and was owned by American conglomerate company ITT until 1980.

In November 2015, Indosat officially rebranded as Indosat Ooredoo. Indosat Ooredoo is the second largest mobile network operator in Indonesia, with a subscriber strength of 58.0 million users.

In September 2021, Indosat announced its merger with Hutchison Asia Telecom Group/Garibaldi Thohir's joint venture PT Hutchison 3 Indonesia (which operates 3-branded networks in Indonesia) to form Indosat Ooredoo Hutchison and closed their merger on 4 January 2022.

==== Ooredoo Myanmar ====
In June 2013, Ooredoo was chosen as one of the two successful applicants among 90 bidders to be awarded a license to operate in Myanmar, considered one of Asia's last remaining greenfield telecom markets.

Formal licenses were granted in January 2014, and Ooredoo pledged an investment of $15 billion to develop Myanmar's telecoms sector, with plans to cover 75% of the population in five years.

As of 2022, amid junta problems, Ooredoo faced financial problems in Myanmar. Later in September 2022, Ooredoo Group sold its Myanmar telecom business to Nine Communications Pte. Ltd. for an enterprise value of US$576 million to focus on strategic markets. In May 2024, Ooredoo finalized the sale of its Myanmar operations.

== Sponsorships ==
Qtel was a minor sponsor for the Brawn GP F1 team for the 2009 Abu Dhabi Grand Prix. The company is also the title sponsor of the Qatar Grand Prix.

Lionel Messi has worked with Ooredoo since 2013 as their global brand ambassador. As part of the partnership, Ooredoo and the Leo Messi Foundation have developed and sponsored projects to stimulate human growth and development across the Middle East, North Africa, and Southeast Asia.

Since 2013, Ooredoo has sponsored Paris Saint-Germain as a premium partner, with Ooredoo's logo featuring on the back of their football kits.

In 2020, the company appointed Ali bin Towar al-Kuwari as its brand ambassador.

== See also ==
- List of mobile network operators
