= Qatar Investment Authority =

Sovereign wealth fund of Qatar

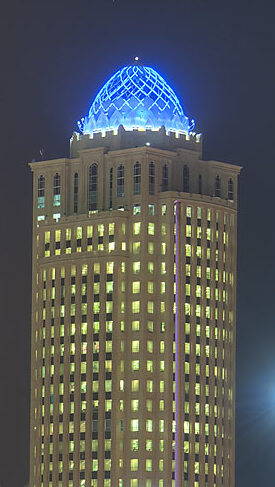
- QIA headquarters, located in the Ooredoo Tower, in the city of Doha
- Type: Sovereign wealth fund
- Founded: 2005; 21 years ago
- Headquarters: Ooredoo Tower, Doha, Qatar
- Key people: Mohammed Saif Al-Sowaidi (CEO); Sheikh Bandar bin Mohammed bin Saoud Al-Thani (chairman)
- AUM: ▲US$600 billion (2026)
- Owner: State of Qatar
- Subsidiaries: QNB Group; Qatari Diar; Qatar Holding; Hassad Food; Katara Hospitality; Harrods Group; Es'hailSat; Ooredoo; Qatar Airways; Qatar Stock Exchange; QNBN
- Website: qia.qa

The Qatar Investment Authority (QIA; Arabic: جهاز قطر للإستثمار) is Qatar's sovereign wealth fund, founded by the State of Qatar in 2005 to strengthen the country's economy by diversifying into new asset classes. As of 2026, the fund had an estimated $600 billion of assets under management.

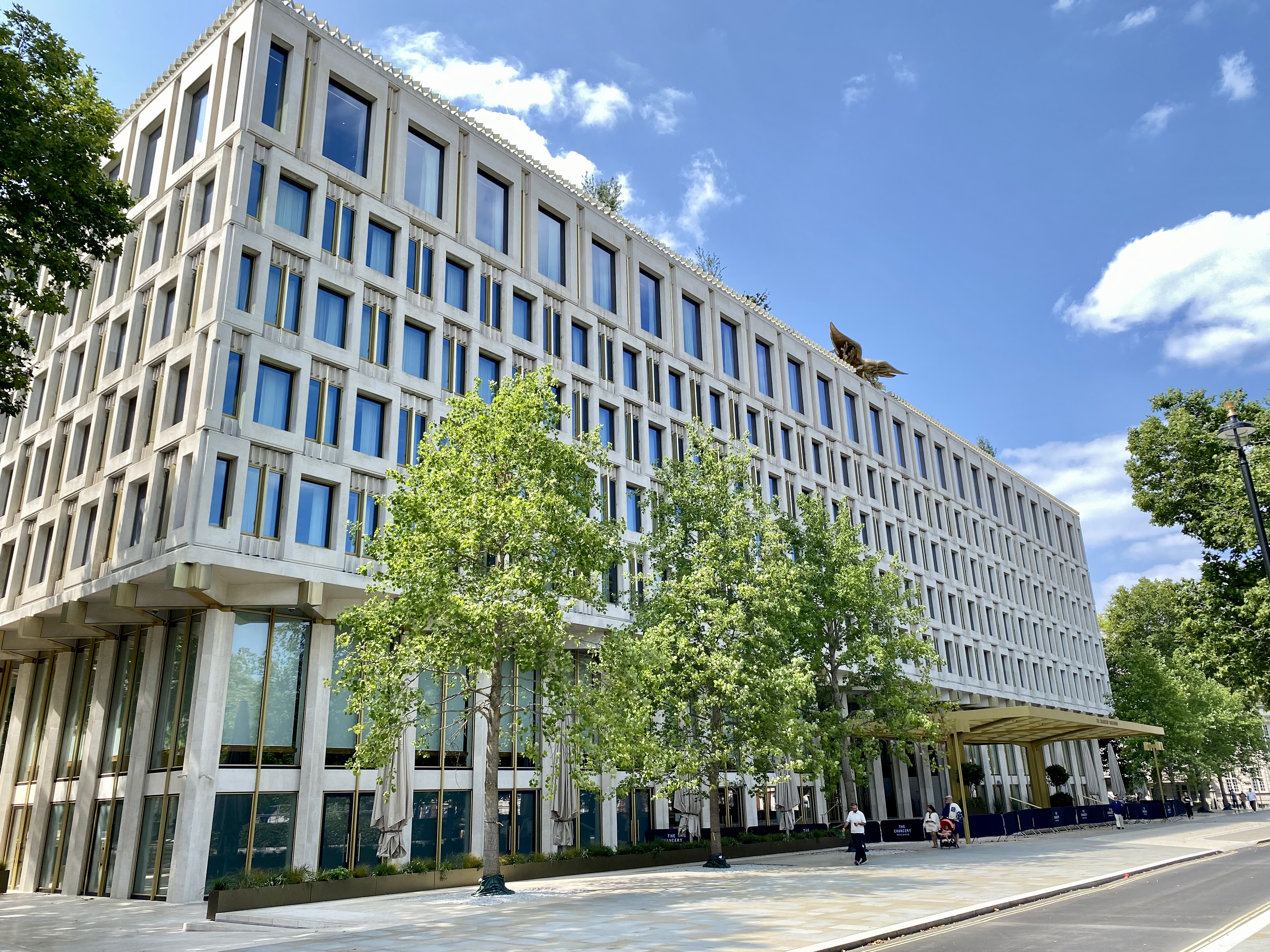
The Chancery Rosewood, London

The QIA's structure and decision-making procedures have been characterized as non-transparent. Spending decisions regarding the fund have been linked to the emir and the prime minister (regardless of whether they sit on the board of the fund).

== History and profile ==
The QIA was founded in 2005 by the then-emir of Qatar, Hamad bin Khalifa Al Thani, to manage the oil and natural gas surpluses of the government of Qatar. As a result of its stated strategy to minimize risk from Qatar's reliance on energy prices, the fund predominantly invests in international markets (United States, Europe and Asia-Pacific) and within Qatar outside the energy sector. Prior to establishment of the QIA in 2005, Qatar's Ministry of Finance had a small in-house team to invest revenue from budget surpluses. The Qatar National Vision 2030 foresees the shift from natural gas based revenue to QIA-type investments between now and then. QIA does not publish its holdings to the market.

In June 2013, after the new emir's arrival to power, and a general reshuffle of Qatar's main organizations, Ahmad Al Sayed was appointed as QIA's chairman and chief executive officer, replacing Hamad bin Jassim Al Thani in the post while also remaining managing director and CEO of QIA's main subsidiary, Qatar Holding. Sayed held the post for 16 months. In January 2015, Sheikh Abdullah bin Mohammed bin Saud Al Thani, chairman of Qatari telecommunications company Ooredoo, was appointed as CEO and served until 2018. From July 2022 to November 2024, Mansoor Ebrahim Al-Mahmoud has held the position of CEO of the company. He was succeeded by Mohammed Saif Al-Sowaidi. In March 2023, Sheikh Bandar bin Mohammed bin Saoud Al-Thani was appointed chairman and replaced his predecessor, Sheikh Mohammed bin Abdulrahman bin Jassim Al Thani, who was named as the country's prime minister in addition to his long-standing role as Minister of Foreign Affairs.

The fund is a founding member of the International Forum of Sovereign Wealth Funds.

As of 2021, the Qatar Investment Authority had more than half of its assets invested in private equity and listed shares. According to Bloomberg, QIA has increasingly targeted start-ups in growth markets, such as Asia and the US. It has invested in indoor farming and firms that make plant-based meat alternatives.

== Structure ==
=== Executive management ===
- Mohammed Saif Al-Sowaidi – CEO

=== Board of directors ===
- Bandar bin Mohammed bin Saoud Al-Thani – Chairman
- Mohammed bin Hamad Bin Khalifa Al Thani – Vice chairman
- Ali bin Ahmed Al-Kuwari
- Saad Sherida Al-Kaabi
- Mohammed bin Hamad bin Qassim Al Abdullah Al Thani
- Hassan Al-Thawadi
- Faisal bin Thani bin Faisal Al Thani
- Nasser Al-Khelaifi

=== Subsidiaries ===
QIA's subsidiaries include Es'hailSat, Hassad Food, Katara Hospitality, Ooredoo, Qatar Airways, Qatari Diar, Qatar Holding, Qatar Stock Exchange, QNB Group and QNBN.

== Investments ==
In January 2013, one writer pegged the QIA investment in Britain at €30 billion, France at €10 billion and Germany at €5 billion, while another reported that the total assets under management in June 2013 was on the order of $100 billion. Qatar Holding's stake in Barclays rose to 12.7% following Barclays' capital raising in October 2008. Qatar Investment Authority holds a small stake in Fisker Automotive. It also holds about 17% stake in the Volkswagen Group, Porsche, Hochtief, as well as investments in Sainsbury's. The French government has made of Qatar a strategic partner, and the list of partnerships between the two states includes Total (4%), EADS (6%), Technip, Air Liquide, Vinci SA (5%), GDF Suez, Veolia (5%), Vivendi, Royal Monceau, France Telecom and Areva. In February 2009, France accorded special beyond-OECD investment privileges to Qatar and its state-owned enterprises; one example is capital gains exemptions in France. The QIA is also reported to hold 8.2% of Glencore.

QIA holds a 6% stake in Credit Suisse. The French government has offered tax exemptions for Qatari real estate investments in the country and have acquired almost $4 billion of property. In May 2012, it acquired a stake below 3% in Royal Dutch Shell. It has announced a plan to raise its stake to 7%.

In November 2012, QIA and Cassa Depositi e Prestiti signed the starting agreement of IQ Made in Italy Venture, a four-year cooperation to promote Made in Italy in Qatar's Arabic partners and to push them to invest in Italian economic sectors like fashion, luxury, design, food, tourism, lifestyle & leisure.

In January 2013, Qatar Holding, an indirect subsidiary of QIA, said it would invest $5 billion into petrochemical projects in Malaysia in three to four years. The investment was said to help Malaysia compete with neighbouring Singapore to become the region's top petrochemical hub. The QIA was planning to invest $200 million in residential property in India through Kotak Realty Fund in late December 2013. In August 2018, Qatar Investment Authority signed Memorandum of Understanding (MoU) to invest up to $500mn in tourism in Indonesia.

In October 2014 Qatar Investment Authority signed an agreement with CITIC Group Corp to launch a $10 billion fund to invest in China. The QIA announced its intention to invest $35b in the US during the next five years, starting in September 2015.

Via Mannai Corporation, it is currently in a process of acquiring the French computer science group GFI. In 2021, QIA with its subsidiary unit - Locus Engineering Management and Services Co. W.L.L. is investing in a sub-Saharan African renewable energy platform being led by Enel Green Power.

During the 2021 St Petersburg Economic Forum, Sheikh Tamim bin Hamad Al Thani highlighted Qatar's solid historic relations with Russia and announced that his country will increase investments in the Russian Federation. He also called on Russia's private sector and the world to explore Qatar's promising business environment in many projects and several spheres.

On 23 January 2023, Qatar Investment Authority has doubled its stake in Credit Suisse Group, becoming the second-biggest shareholder and underlining the growing importance of Middle Eastern investors to the ailing Swiss bank.

In June 2024, Reuters wrote that QIA had agreed to buy a 10% stake in ChinaAMC and was awaiting approval by Chinese regulators.

=== Real estate ===
The QIA real estate portfolio includes direct ownership, joint ventures, trusts and funds. It wholly controls Qatari Diar, a property investment company, and also owns Katara Hospitality, a global hotel owner, developer and operator.

In 2013, QIA acquired a 40% stake in the Porta Nuova business district in Milan, later purchasing the remaining interest in 2015.

QIA has purchased $3.78 billion in Manhattan properties since 2014, including 111 West 33rd Street, 501 Seventh Avenue and 250 West 57th Street. In 2015, in a joint venture with Brookfield Property Partners, QIA acquired a 44% stake in the Manhattan West development. In 2022, QIA and Brookfield sold a 49% shareholding in the project to Blackstone Real Estate.

QIA and Brookfield jointly acquired Canary Wharf Group for £2.6 billion. The Canary Wharf Group is London's largest property owner, with almost 21.5m sq ft of space on its books, according to data from the research firm Datscha.

QIA has also made investments in Asia Square in Singapore and the HSBC Tower in London. In 2016, QIA purchased a 9.9% stake in Empire State Realty Trust.

Qatar Investment Authority is a major shareholder in Heathrow Airport, holding 20 percent of the airport. In 2017, the company invested a further £650 million (US$807 million).

QIA has held a 20% stake in Inmobiliaria Colonial since 2018. In August 2018, Brookfield signed a 99-year lease on Jared Kushner's financially troubled 666 Fifth Avenue skyscraper. The deal raised suspicions that the Qatar Investment Authority, a major investor in Brookfield, was attempting to influence the Trump administration.

In 2019, QIA partnered with Crown Acquisitions to acquire a significant stake in Vornado Realty Trust, a portfolio of premium New York retail properties.

QIA also owns luxury hotels including the St. Regis San Francisco, the St. Regis New York, and the W Barcelona. In 2023, it acquired the Park Lane Hotel in New York.

==== Qatari Diar ====
Logo of Qatari Diar

Qatari Diar is a real estate company established by the Qatar Investment Authority in 2005 with headquarters in Lusail.

In 2008, Qatari Diar acquired French engineering company Cegelec, which was later sold, in 2010, to Vinci SA in exchange for 31.5 million Vinci shares.

By 2011 the company had stakes in the utility Suez Environnement and in Veolia Environnement (4.6%, sold in 2018). In 2011, Qatari Diar bought the Port Tarraco Marina in Tarragona, Spain. The company invested into The Shard, a skyscraper in London designed by Renzo Piano, and the former Royal Dutch Shell plc headquarters. Other London investments include the Chelsea Barracks, the US Embassy, Elephant and Castle and Grosvenor Waterside.

In 2012, it completed the acquisition of Credit Suisse's headquarters in London. Qatari Diar along with Canary Wharf, won a £300mn deal to redevelop the Shell Centre in London, the former London headquarters of Royal Dutch Shell.

As of 2013, Qatari Diar was one of the major financiers of a recent development known as CityCenterDC, as it invested $650 million into the project. Qatari Diar also invested into The Peninsula Paris hotel. In 2018, Qatari Diar started to develop the Chancery Rosewood hotel in the building of the former US Embassy at 30 Grosvenor Square in Mayfair, London. The hotel was opened in September 2025.

In April 2023, the company sold its 22 per cent stake in the build-to-rent developer Get Living, which owns the publicly funded Olympic village also known as East Village, London. Qatari Diar sold its shares to Aware Super, an Australian pension fund.

=== Technology, media and telecom ===
Qatar Holding, a subsidiary of QIA, holds a 13% in the French media and publishing group Lagardère.

On 3 December 2010, QIA, along with Colony Capital and Tutor-Saliba Corporation, was part of an investment group known as Filmyard Holdings, which purchased Miramax from Disney. In December 2017, QIA and hedge fund Elliott Investment jointly acquired the US-based networking software company Gigamon for $1.6 billion. In September 2018, QIA jointly led a $400 million funding round for the US-based real estate technology company Compass alongside Softbank Vision Fund.

In 2019, QIA led an investment of $150 million in Indian education start-up BYJU'S. In 2022, QIA partnered with BYJU'S to launch a new research and development centre in Doha as well as an edtech business. In October of that year, QIA led an additional $250 million funding round for BYJU'S.

Together with other investors, QIA bought a 10% stake in Vivendi's Universal Music Group in December 2019. In March 2021, QIA became a minority investor in Coveo, the cloud-based search, recommendations, and personalization company. In December 2022, QIA led an $196.5 million funding round for Snyk. In January 2023, QIA invested $150 million in The North Road Company. In May 2023, London (United Kingdom) based and Sachin Dev Duggal-led Builder.ai received $250 million in series D funding, led by the QIA. In the same month, QIA co-invested $105 million in the Turkish AI platform Insider alongside Istanbul-based Esas Private Equity. In June 2023, QIA invested $4.05 billion in Monumental Sports & Entertainment, the parent company of the Washington Wizards, Washington Capitals, and Washington Mystics, securing a 5% stake in the company. In December 2023, QIA acquired a 4.26% stake in the Chinese software company Kingdee.

QIA participated in the first funding round of xAI, as well as in its $6 billion funding round C in December 2024. In November 2024, QIA led a $125 million funding round for the AI platform Cresta. In January 2025, QIA participated in a funding round for the data and AI company Databricks and in a $100 million series D funding round for the AI-powered data startup Instabase.

In December 2025, the company announced it had increased its minority stake in Monumental Sports & Entertainment, having initially acquired a five per cent shareholding in June 2023.

=== Consumer and retail ===
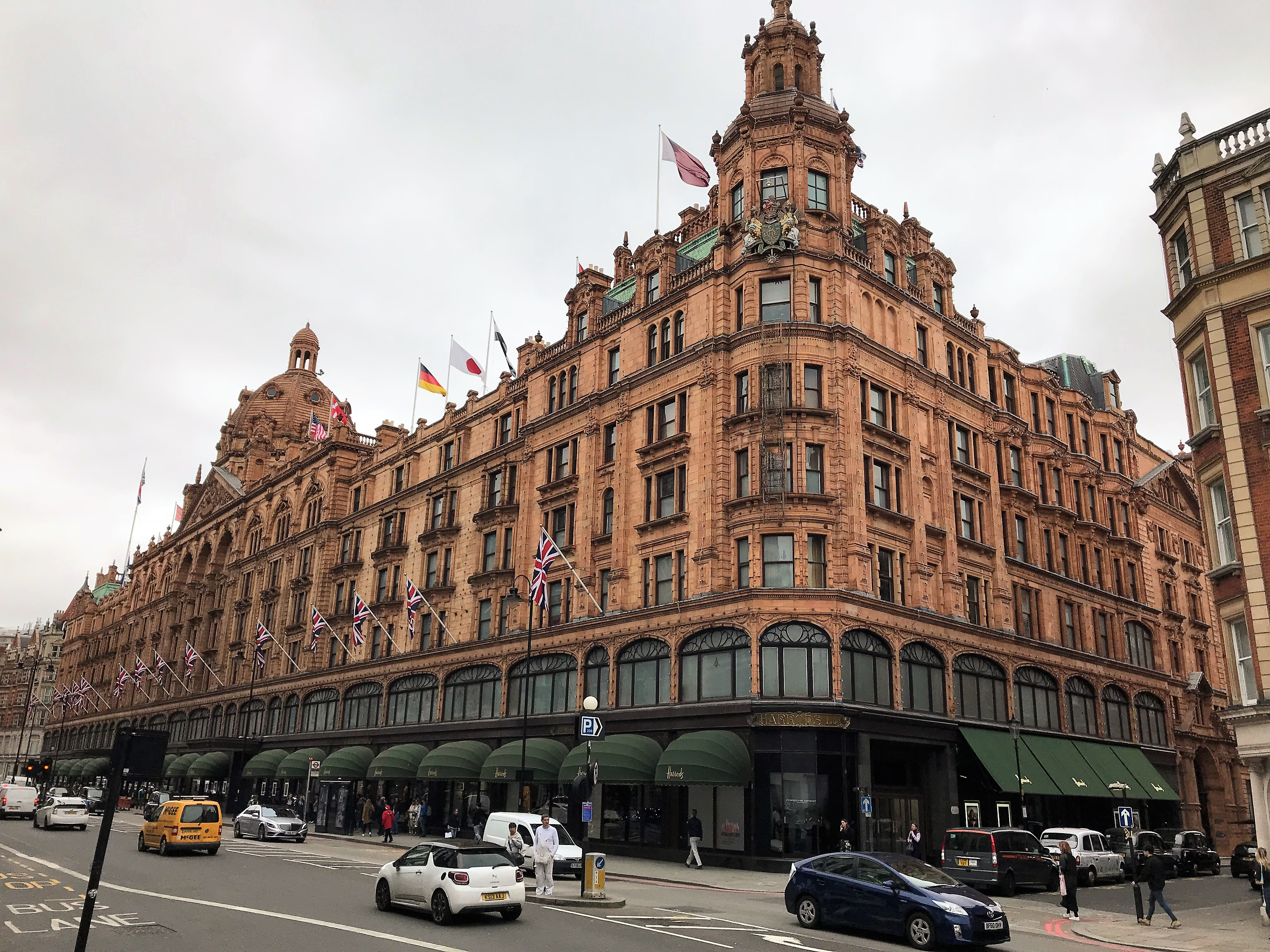
Harrods, Brompton Road store with Qatar flag

In May 2010, Qatar Holding, an indirect subsidiary of QIA, purchased the Harrods Group from Mohamed Al-Fayed, including the Knightsbridge department store. The sale was concluded in the early hours of 8 May, when Qatari Prime Minister Hamad bin Jassim bin Jaber Al Thani came to London to finalise the deal, saying that the acquisition of Harrods would add "much value" to the investment portfolio of Qatar Holdings while his deputy, Hussain Ali Al-Abdulla, called it a "landmark transaction". A spokesman for Mohamed Al-Fayed said "in reaching the decision to retire, [Fayed] wished to ensure that the legacy and traditions that he has built up in Harrods would be continued." QIA is also the largest shareholder in Sainsbury's.

In 2021, QIA led a $200 million funding round in Eat Just, a plant-based food start-up. In the same year, they also led a $175 million funding round for the Indian Cloud Kitchen Startup Rebel Foods, in which they invested another $25 million in 2025. QIA participated in a $700 million funding round for Indian food tech firm Swiggy in January 2022, while already holding a stake in the company. Later in the year, QIA led a $250 million round in Innovafeed.

In 2021, QIA participated in an $1.5 billion funding round for the Turkish online retailer Trendyol. In 2023, QIA bought a 1% stake in India's Reliance Retail Ventures for $1 billion.

== List of holdings and stakes ==
Asset	Stake / Role	As-of date	Notes
Heathrow Airport Holdings (via FGP Topco)	20%	Jul 2025	
Volkswagen AG (ordinary shares)	17.0%	Dec 31 2024	Third-largest holder of voting shares.
Harrods Group / Harrods Ltd.	Indirect 100% via Qatar Holding LLC	Oct 2025	
J Sainsbury plc	~9.5%	Oct 2024	
Reliance Retail Ventures (India)	~1%	Aug 2023	$1 bn investment
Fluence Energy (US: FLNC)	11.6%	Dec 2023	
Ivanhoe Mines (Canada)	~4%	Sep 2025	$500 m private placement
Audi Motorsport AG	~30%	Nov 2024	
Lagardère SA (France)	11.52% (share capital)	May 2022	
Katara Hospitality	QIA subsidiary	Oct 2025	Global hotels platform owned by QIA/Qatar Holding group.
Qatari Diar	QIA subsidiary	Oct 2025	Real estate development arm.
Hassad Food	QIA subsidiary	Oct 2025	Food/agri investments for food security.
Anthropic		Sep 2025	AI safety and research platform.
Snyk		Dec 2022	Snyk is a technology company offering a software development security platform using open-source code.
Flipkart	$150 million	Jul 2021	Flipkart is an Indian e-commerce platform offering over 150 million products for sale across 800 categories. It was acquired by Walmart in 2018.
Eat Just	$200 Million	March 2021	Eat Just is a San Francisco-based food technology company founded in 2011. The company is known for its bean-based egg substitute called Just Egg. Eat Just also produces egg-free mayonnaise.
CureVac	$126 million	Jul 2020	A biopharmaceutical company developing prophylactic and therapeutic application of messenger RNA, which can be used to develop vaccines. It was founded in 2000 and is located in Tübingen, Germany.
Califia Farms	$225 million	Jul 2020	Califia Farms makes plant-based dairy products (primarily almond based) such as plant-based milks, plant-based creamers, juices, and dairy-free probiotic yoghurts. The company was founded in 2010 by Greg Steltenpohl and is located in San Joaquin Valley, California.
Starling Bank		March 2021	Starling is an UK-based mobile-first digital banking startup.
Compass		Sep 2018	Compass is a real estate technology company providing real estate listing application for buying, selling and renting properties.
BYJU's	$150 million, $250 million	Jul 2019, Oct 2022	BYJU's is an educational technology company providing online learning and tutoring services for students.
Codiak BioSciences		Nov 2017	Codiak Biosciences is a biotechnology company developing exosome therapeutics.
PsiQuantum	$1bn	Sep 2025	PsiQuantum is a company that is building a general-purpose silicon photonic quantum computer.
Thumbtack	$275 million	Jun 2021	Thumbtack is a company operating an online platform for finding and hiring workers for particular tasks.
Tandem	$78 million	March 2020	Tandem is a neobank based in United Kingdom offering Personal accounts including a debit card, with all transactions being managed from an iPhone or Android application. Tandem currently accepts to open mobile bank accounts for residents of United Kingdom.
Instabase	$100 million	January 2025	Instabase is a platform for businesses to build customizable apps for automating different parts of their business.
Celonis		Aug 2022	Celonis is company designing an intelligent big data technology analyzing and visualizing company processes.
Insider	$105 million	May 2023	Insider is an AI-driven omnichannel and customer engagement platform founded in 2012 by Hande Cilingir.
D2iQ		May 2018	D2iQ is a San Francisco-based company founded by Florian Liebert.
Checkout.com		January 2022	Dailyhunt is a company founded in 2009 by Virendra Gupta.
Cresta		November 2024	Cresta leverages artificial intelligence to help sales and service agents improve the quality of their customer service.
Traveloka	$250 million	July 2020	Traveloka is an online flight search engine for routes and airlines.
Fanatics, Inc.		April 2022 February 2025	Fanatics is an online retailer of officially licensed sports merchandise.
Entrada Therapeutics		March 2021	Entrada Therapeutics is a biologics delivered to cytosol founded in 2016.
Paycor		January 2021	Paycor is a company founded in 1990 by Peter Swaniker.
Carsome		January 2022	Carsome is a company founded in 2015.
Monumental Sports & Entertainment		June 2023-present	Monumental is an American sports and venue management company. QIA initially acquired a minority shareholding of five per cent in June 2023, before increasing its stake in December 2025.

== Controversies ==
=== Sunday Telegraph's campaign ===
In October 2014 the British newspaper Sunday Telegraph launched a campaign, called "Stop the Funding of Terror", to "press for action to end the flow of funds to extremist groups from individuals in states such as Qatar, Kuwait and Saudi Arabia". The campaign put special stress on the Qatari government and emir Hamad Al Thani, and on Qatari investments in the UK.

=== Barclays ===
In 2008 during the 2008 financial crisis Barclays raised about £11.8 billion, one of the investors among others was QIA. Barclays reportedly received €7.5 billion ($8.2 billion) cash injection from QIA's subsidiary but did not inform its shareholders. Barclays was charged with failing to act with integrity and breaching disclosure rules for UK listed companies. Barclays then made secret advisory deals with companies linked to QIA, agreeing to pay about £322 million in fees. These undisclosed deals were part of the incentive for Qatar to invest. In 2011 both the Serious Fraud Office and the Financial Conduct Authority (FCA) investigated Barclays' €2.4 billion ($2.7 billion) secret transaction with a Politically Exposed Person (PEP) from Qatar whose identity remains protected by the financial giant and FCA. A In that case, Barclays failed to conduct "due skill, care, and diligence" at the base of Britain's anti-money laundering rules. As a result, the UK financial watchdog meted out a record €92 million ($104 million) penalty against the financial giant. In August 2012, the UK's Serious Fraud Office (SFO) started a criminal investigation regarding if Barclays had properly informed investors about these payments. This criminal investigation led to charges against the bank and some top executives, including former CEO John Varley, for conspiracy and giving unlawful financial help. By 2020, all the people involved were cleared, and the charges against the bank were dropped. But at the same time, there were also civil lawsuits against the bank, most notable was the on from Amanda Staveley’s PCP Capital, claiming Barclays lied about differences in the deal’s terms. In early 2021, a court said Barclays had committed “serious deceit,” but the claimant still lost the case.

In October 2022, the Financial Conduct Authority (FCA) announced that it will fine Barclays £50 million for breaking listing rules by not disclosing key information. Barclays appealed, and the fine was later reduced to £40 million. The bank didn't admit to the accusations but dropped its appeal to end the 16 year dispute and move forward.

=== Volkswagen ===
Bloomberg estimated that in September 2015, the QIA lost $5.9 billion on paper from its stakes in Volkswagen Group and Glencore after Volkswagen admitted to using illegal software to cheat on emissions tests in the US. By holding 17% of Volkswagen's ordinary stock and 13% of preferred shares, Qatar's sovereign-wealth fund is the third largest investor shareholder in the firm.

In July 2026, the QIA exercised its clout as Volkswagen's third-largest shareholder to scuttle its proposed defense arrangement with Israel's Rafael Advanced Defense Systems. According to media reports, the QIA—which controls roughly 17 percent of Volkswagen's voting rights and holds two seats on the company's supervisory board—blocked the initiative, which would have entailed manufacturing components for Israel's Iron Dome missile defense system at Volkswagen's Osnabrück plant.

=== Qatar Islamic Bank (QIB) ===
Qatar Investment Authority's affiliation with Qatar Islamic Bank (16.67%) raises concerns about the extent to which the sovereign wealth fund may be or have been involved in some of the bank's activities. In a September 2015 piece, the Consortium Against Terrorist Finance (CATF) discussed the Sharia-compliant financial giant's correspondents and posited that several QIB's correspondents "have controversial histories of affiliation with or support of terrorist or extremist activities". According to US Department of States country reports on terrorism 2019, the Qatari government drafted new AML/CFT legislation, which was finalized and passed into law on 11 September 2019. This legislation included the country forming National Anti-Terrorism Committee. The NATC is tasked with formulating Qatar's Counter Terrorism policy, ensuring inter agency coordination, fulfilling Qatar's obligations to counter terrorism under international conventions, and participating in multilateral conferences on terrorism. According to this reporting, US officials met regularly with the chairman of the NATC to discuss implementation of the CT MOU and overall CT cooperation.

Also, the Qatar State Security Bureau (SSB) maintained an aggressive posture toward monitoring internal terrorism-related activities. Qatar is also a member of the Defeat-ISIS Coalition's CIFG and the TFTC. The country co-hosted a high-level event promoting the power of sport to prevent and counter terrorist radicalization and recruitment on the margins of UN General Assembly in September 2019.

There has also been findings regarding counter terrorism measure taken by Qatar in the report published by United Nations on 27 March 2022, during the Fourth High-Level Strategic Dialogue between the State of Qatar & the United Nations Office of Counter-Terrorism (UNOCT) where the two bodies discussed strategic priorities and collaboration for effective United Nations support to Member States on counter-terrorism. The two sides reaffirmed their strong partnership and discussed opportunities for further collaboration against terrorism. The State of Qatar is the second largest contributor to the United Nations Trust Fund for Counter-Terrorism out of a total 35 other donors.

=== Builder.ai ===
In 2025, British startup Builder.ai announced bankruptcy proceedings after a controversy involving Indian workers acting as AI bots under a false product scam. Builder.AI had secured $250 million of investment from QIA, years prior.

== See also ==
- Economy of Qatar
- Iberdrola
