= Qatar Central Bank =

Central bank of Qatar

Qatar Central Bank مصرف قطر المركزي

- Central bank of: Qatar
- Headquarters: Post Box No. 1234, Doha, Qatar
- Coordinates: 25.2902°N 51.5349°E
- Established: May 13, 1973; 52 years ago
- Ownership: 100% state ownership
- Governor: Bandar bin Mohamed bin Saud al-Thani
- Currency: Qatari riyal QAR (ISO 4217)
- Reserves: $53.993 billion USD
- Preceded by: Qatar Monetary Agency
- Website: www.qcb.gov.qa

The Qatar Central Bank (QCB, Arabic: مصرف قطر المركزي) is the central bank of Qatar.

Originally known as the Qatar Monetary Agency it was founded in 1973.

Over its history the Qatar Central Bank has increasingly worked in association with other, larger central banks to achieve a stable currency for the country, most recently and notably with the Monetary Authority of Singapore.

== History ==
The Qatar Central Bank was originally until 1993 known as the Qatar Monetary Agency (and was known before that as Qatar Dubai Currency Board), founded on May 13, 1973, after Dubai joined the United Arab Emirates and disengaged itself from British monetary policy which the area had previously followed. The Qatar Monetary Agency assumed the duties of a central bank. In 1973, Amiri Decree No. 24 authorized the issuance of the Qatari Riyal (QR).

== Objectives ==
Article no. 5 of the Law of the Qatar Central Bank and the Regulation of financial Institutions issued by Law no. 13 of 2012 states the central bank's objectives for Qatar's economic policy:

1. Preserve money value and assure monetary stability.
2. Act as a regulatory, control and supervisory higher authority for all the services, business, markets and financial activities inside or though the state of Qatar in accordance with the best international standards and practices.
3. Establish a stable, transparent, competitive and governance sector for carrying out services, business, markets and financial activities based on market rules.
4. Reinforce public confidence in Qatar as a pioneering global hub for services, business, markets and financial activities.
5. Ensure consistent development of services, markets and financial activities sector in line with the objectives of economic and comprehensive development in Qatar.

In addition, the Qatar Central Bank serves the primary roles of many central banks. These roles are stated in Article no. 6, 7, and 8 of Law no. 13 and include (among others) the following duties:

1. Stability of QR exchange rate and its capacity of being exchanged for other currencies.
2. Cash issuance and regulation of its circulation.
3. Act as a bank for all the banks and financial institutions in Qatar.
4. Financial and Banking stability.
5. Administer and invest its money and reserves.
6. Lay out regulations, instructions and guidance on governance, transparency and sound management in all financial institutions under QCB's supervision.

== Leadership ==
The Board of Directors of the Qatar Central Bank is composed of five members. The Governor and Chairman of the Board of Directors is Bandar bin Mohamed bin Saud al-Thani.

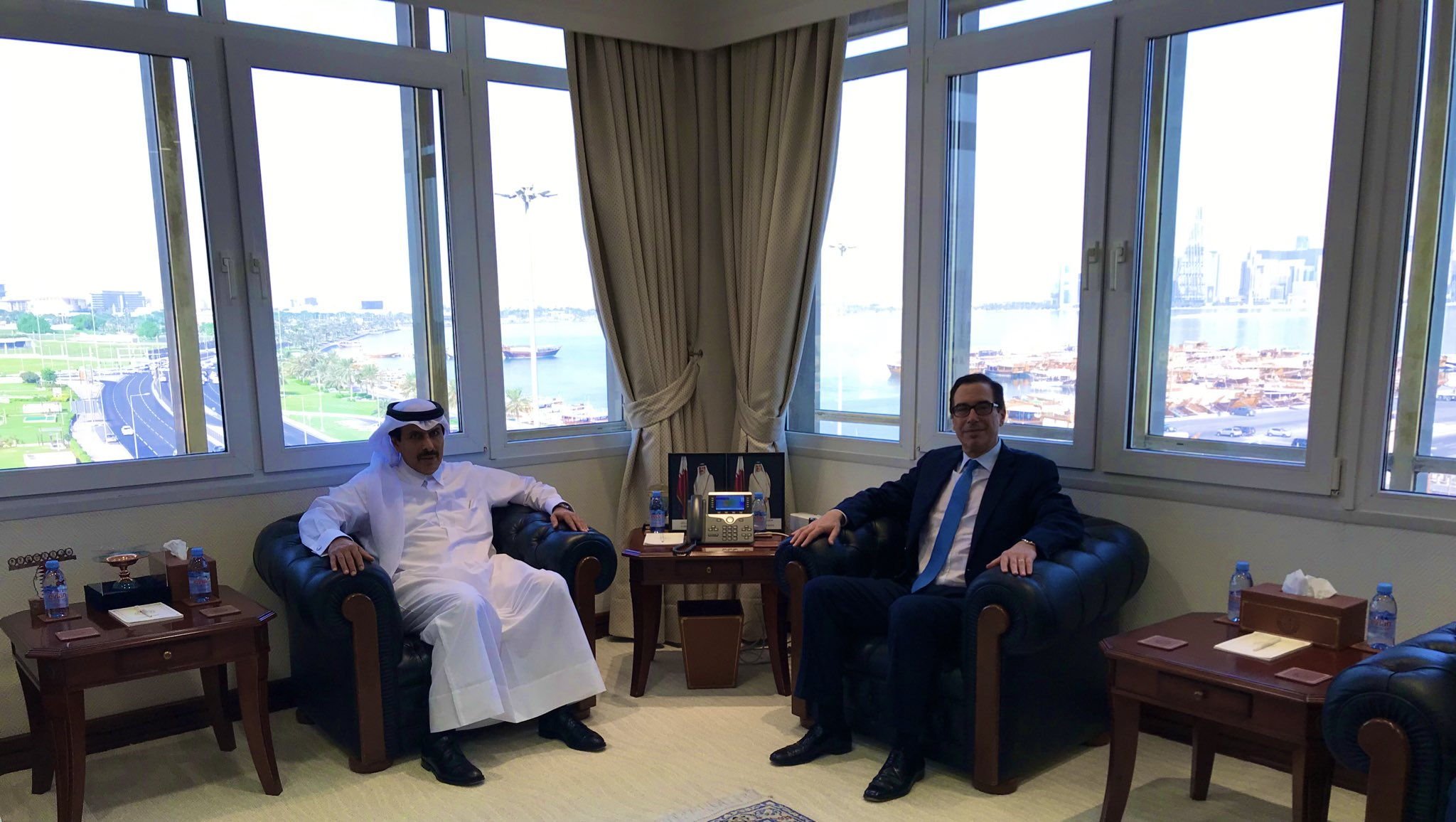
Abdullah bin Saud al-Thani

== Governors ==
Name	Took office	Left office	Notes
Majid Muhammad Majid al-Saad	? - 1983	January 1990	
Abdullah bin Khalid al-Attiyah	January 1990	May 2006	
Abdullah bin Saud al-Thani	May 2006	November 2021	
Bandar bin Mohamed bin Saud al-Thani	November 2021	Incumbent	

== Legislation ==
=== QCB Law ===
On August 5, 1993, Amiri Decree No.15 was issued, establishing Qatar Central Bank (QCB) as the monetary authority in the State of Qatar. QCB is mandated to formulate monetary and banking and credit policies so as to achieve certain financial and economic objectives—QCB Objectives.

=== Investment Funds Law ===
==== Article (1) ====
In the applying the provisions of this law, the following words and expressions shall carry the meanings expressed next to each, unless the context requires otherwise:

The Ministry : Ministry of Economy and Commerce.

The Minister : Minister of Economy and Commerce.

The Bank : Qatar Central Bank.

The Market : Doha Stock Market.

The Fund : A monetary investment entity acquiring the legal personality and founded pursuant to the provisions of the law.

The bank : Any of the operating banks in the State.

The Investment Company 1 Any financial company authorized by the bank to perform investment works.

The Founder : The bank or the investment company authorized to found investment Funds.

The Fund Manager : The natural or artificial person appointed by the founder to manage the Fund.

The Investment Trustee : The bank undertaking the trusteeship of investment of the Fund assets.

The Investment Units : The shares constituting the capital of the Fund.

==== Article (2) ====
It is permissible to create Funds to invest and develop financial securities and instruments and funds pursuant to the provisions of this law, the executory rules thereof and the instructions issued by the bank. It is also permissible to create investment Funds that handle the investment in real estates and development projects domestically and abroad.

==== Article (3) ====
The foundation of the Fund that undertakes investments in real estates, funds and stocks abroad is implemented by virtue of an authorization from the bank. The foundation of the Fund that undertakes investments in the shares of the Qatari joint-stock companies and in the shares enrolled in the stock-market, real estates, and projects within the state of Qatar is implemented by virtue of an authorization issued by the bank, further to the approval of the minister.

==== Article (4) ====
The capital of the Fund shall be divided into equal investment units and the liability of the owners of these units shall be limited proportionally to their shares in the capital, and the owners of these units are not allowed to take part in the investment activities in the assets of the Fund. Every Fund capital unit shall have a nominal value in Qatari Riyals or in any other currency. In all cases, the nominal value of the unit shall be paid off all at once or according to the requirement of the Fund's basic law.

==== Article (5) ====
The Funds wishing to register its investment units in the stock market have to obtain the approval of the stock market and the bank according to the prevailing laws and regulations. After its foundation, the Funds shall be registered in the commercial register at the ministry in a peculiar Funds Register. The founder may create more than one Fund.

==== Article (6) ====
Every Fund shall have a legal personality and a financial estate independent from the founder. The Fund's assets may not be distrained unless in terms of fulfillment of the obligations arising from the investment of its assets. The founder may appoint a Fund's investment trustee according to the instructions adopted by the bank. The investment trustee may not be owner of any of the Fund's units.

==== Article (7) ====
Every Fund shall have a director who represents the Fund before the judicial authorities and in its Relation with others, and has the right to sign for the Fund. The Fund director may not be a member of the board of directors or an executive director of the founder. The appointment of the Fund manager shall be subject to the approval of the bank, while it shall be performed through coordination with the market in case of the Funds that undergo registration of their investment units for circulation in the market.

==== Article (8) ====
Funds floating their investment units for circulation shall be subject to the laws, rules and decisions regulating the market. In all cases, the accounts and activities of the Funds shall be subject to the surveillance and supervision of the bank and to the bank's instructions.

==== Article (9) ====
Investment units are floated for public or private underwriting. Non-Qatari artificial and natural persons may participate in the Funds, while the minister shall determine, by counseling with the Minister of Finance and the Governor of the bank, the percentages of their participation in the Funds that deal with shares, real estates and Qatari projects.

==== Article (10) ====
Every Fund shall have one or more auditors to be appointed pursuant to the conditions and procedures determined by the bank.

== See also ==
- Qatari riyal
- Ministry of Finance (Qatar)
- Economy of Qatar
- List of central banks
- List of financial supervisory authorities by country
