= Chaldean Catholic Eparchy of Aqra =

The Chaldean Catholic Eparchy of Aqra (also spelled Aqrā or Akra) is an Eastern Catholic eparchy (diocese) of the Chaldean Catholic Church (which uses the East Syriac Rite) in northern Iraq.

It is a suffragan of the Chaldean Catholic Patriarch of Babylon and has its episcopal see in the Iraqi Kurdish city of Aqrah.

== History ==
The eparchy was established in 1850, on territory split off from the then Chaldean Catholic Eparchy of Amadiyah.

It was suppressed and merged back into its mother church on 23 April 1895, when its eparch acceded to the cathedral throne, but was restored to an independent Eparchy on 24 February 1910.

== Eparchs ==
- Giovanni Elia Mellus, Order of Saint Jerome (O.S.H.) (1864.10.07 – 1890.09.04), later Eparch (Bishop) of Mardin of the Chaldeans (1890.09.04 – death 1908.02.16)
- Giovanni Sahhar (1890.09.09 – 1909.06.13), later (during the suppression of the see) Eparch of Amadiyah of the Chaldeans (Iraq) (1895.04.29 – 1909.06.13)
- Paul Cheikho (1947.02.22 – 1957.06.28), later Eparch of Aleppo of the Chaldeans (Syria) (1957.06.28 – 1958.12.13), Bishop of Mosul of the Chaldeans (Iraq) (1958.12.13 – 1960), Patriarch of Babylon of the Chaldeans (Iraq) ([1958.12.13] 1959.03.12 – death 1989.04.13), President of Synod of the Chaldean Church (1969 – 1989.04.13) and President of Assembly of the Catholic Bishops of Iraq (1976 – 1989.04.13)
- André Sana (1957.06.20 – 1977.12.14), later Metropolitan Archeparch of Kirkuk of the Chaldeans (Iraq) (1977.12.14 – 2003.09.27; died 2013)
- Abdul-Ahad Rabban, O.S.H. (1980.04.23 – 1998.07.25), also Apostolic Administrator of Sulaimaniya of the Chaldeans (Iraq) (1982 – 1998)
- Youhanna Issa Apostolic Administrator (1999 – ...).

== See also ==
- Catholic Church in Iraq
- Chaldean Catholic Church
