= Erbil Stones and Gems Museum =

Museum in Iraqi Kurdistan

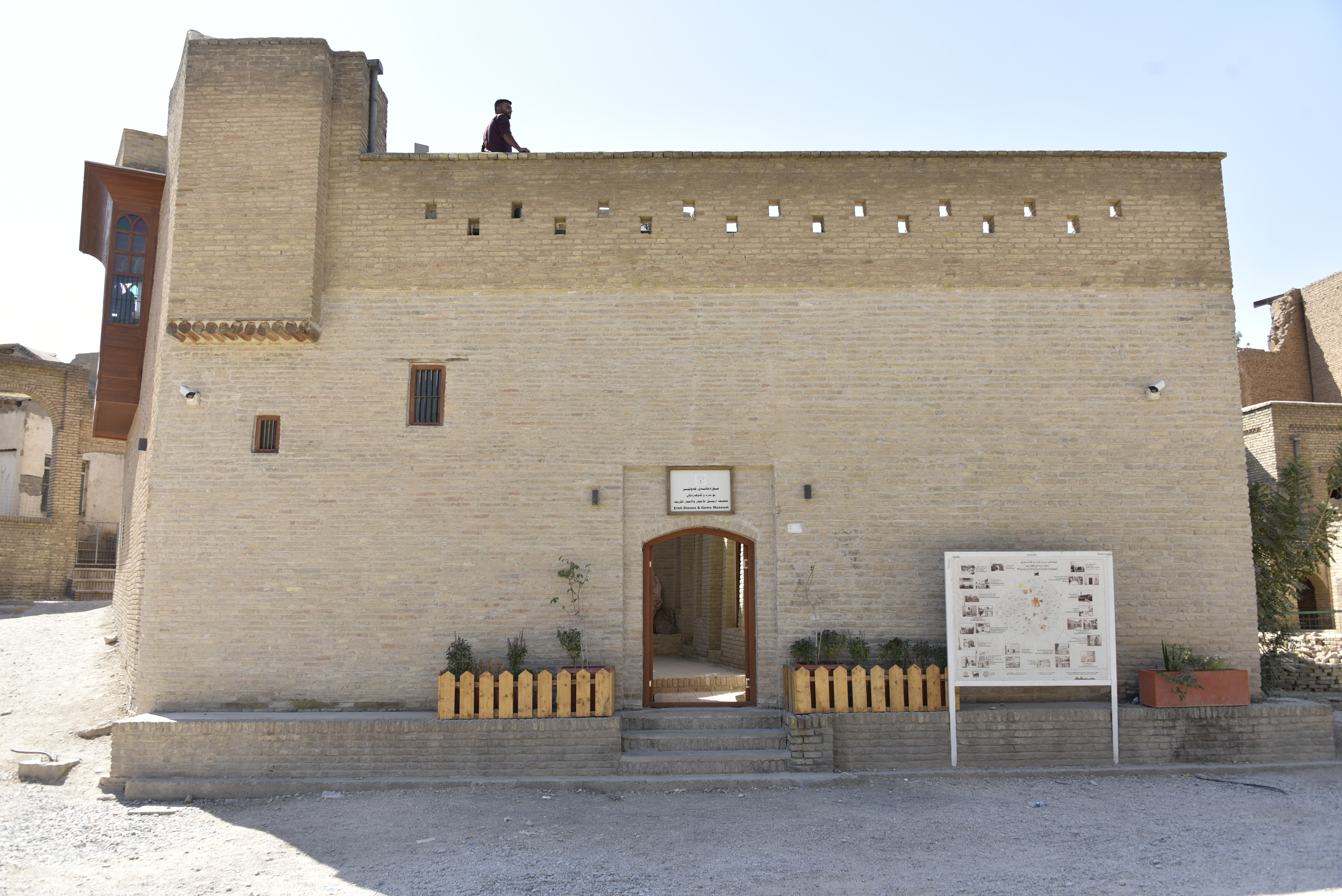
- Erbil Stones and Gems Museum within the Citadel of Erbil
- Established: 1 January 2014 (originally in Shaqlawa), relocated to the Citadel in 2016
- Location: Erbil Citadel, Erbil, Iraqi Kurdistan
- Coordinates: 36°11′25″N 44°00′34″E
- Type: Mineralogy, Geology, Gemstones
- Collections: Stones, gems, fossils, meteorites
- Founder: Sarbast Majeed
- Owner: Sarbast Majeed
- Public transit access: Erbil City Center
- Website: Facebook page

Erbil Stones and Gems Museum is a small museum located within the Citadel of Erbil, at the heart of the city of Erbil (Hawler), the capital of Iraqi Kurdistan.

== History ==
The museum was founded (and is owned) by Sarbast Majeed. Majeed, a graduate of Mosul College of Sciences, Department of Geology in 1985, had gathered his 40-year collection of gemstones from many parts of the world and displayed it originally in a house in the small city of Shaqlawa (northeast of Hawler) in 2014.

In 2016, the museum was relocated to the Citadel of Erbil and now occupies one of the traditional 2-story renovated buildings.

== Exhibits ==
The museum displays a multitude of common and rare stones and gems from within Iraq and many other countries as well as meteorite fragments and fossils and a variety of other items; the first and only of its kind in the Republic of Iraq and its Kurdistan Region. There is a shop on the 1st (upper) floor that sells genuine stones as well as replicas. The museum's entry is 1500 Iraqi Dinars (approximately $1.0). No-flash photography is allowed but photography of any kind within the shop is prohibited.

== Gallery ==
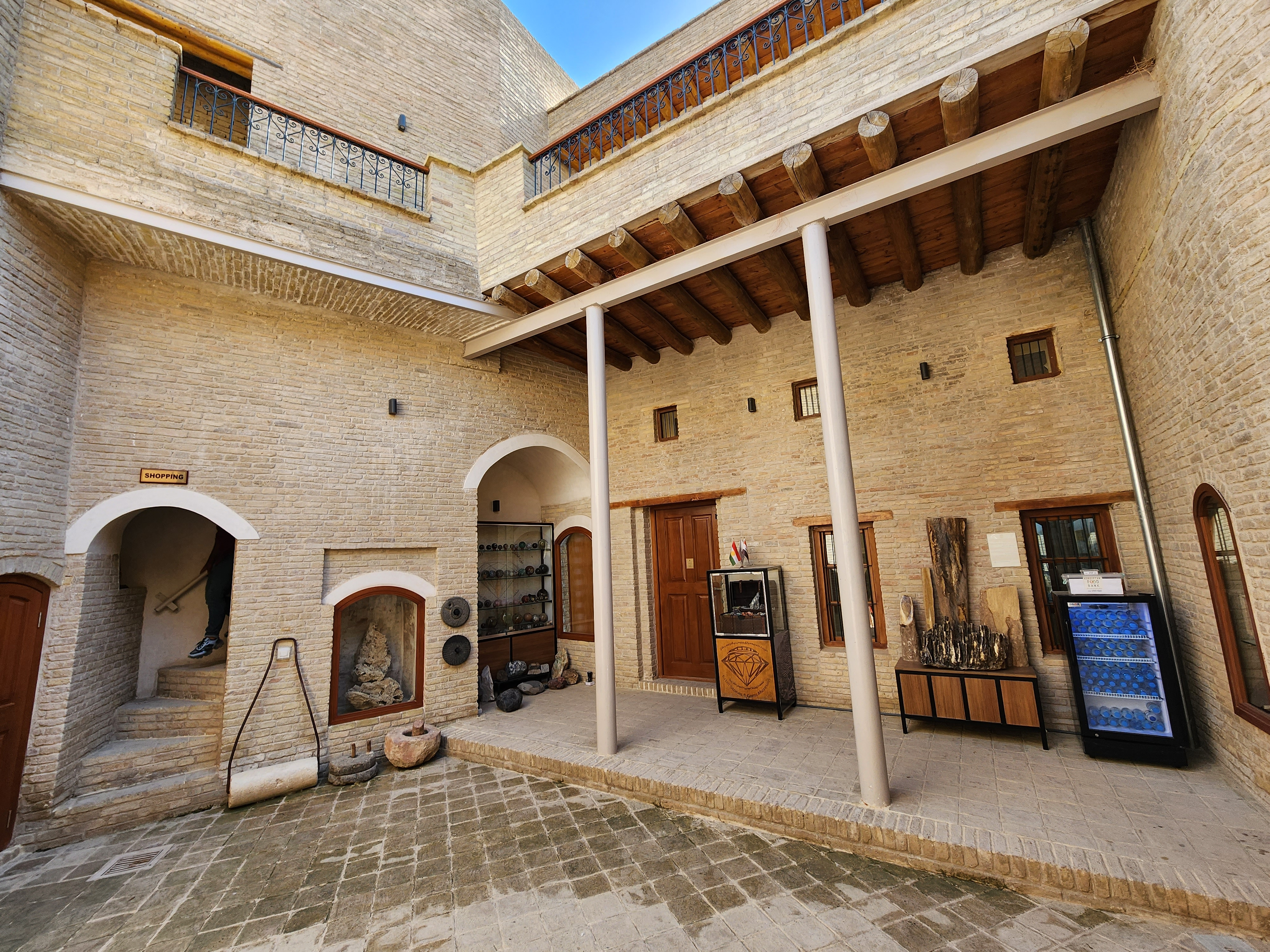
Erbil Stones and Gems Museum, Erbil Citadel, Hawler, Iraq. Interior

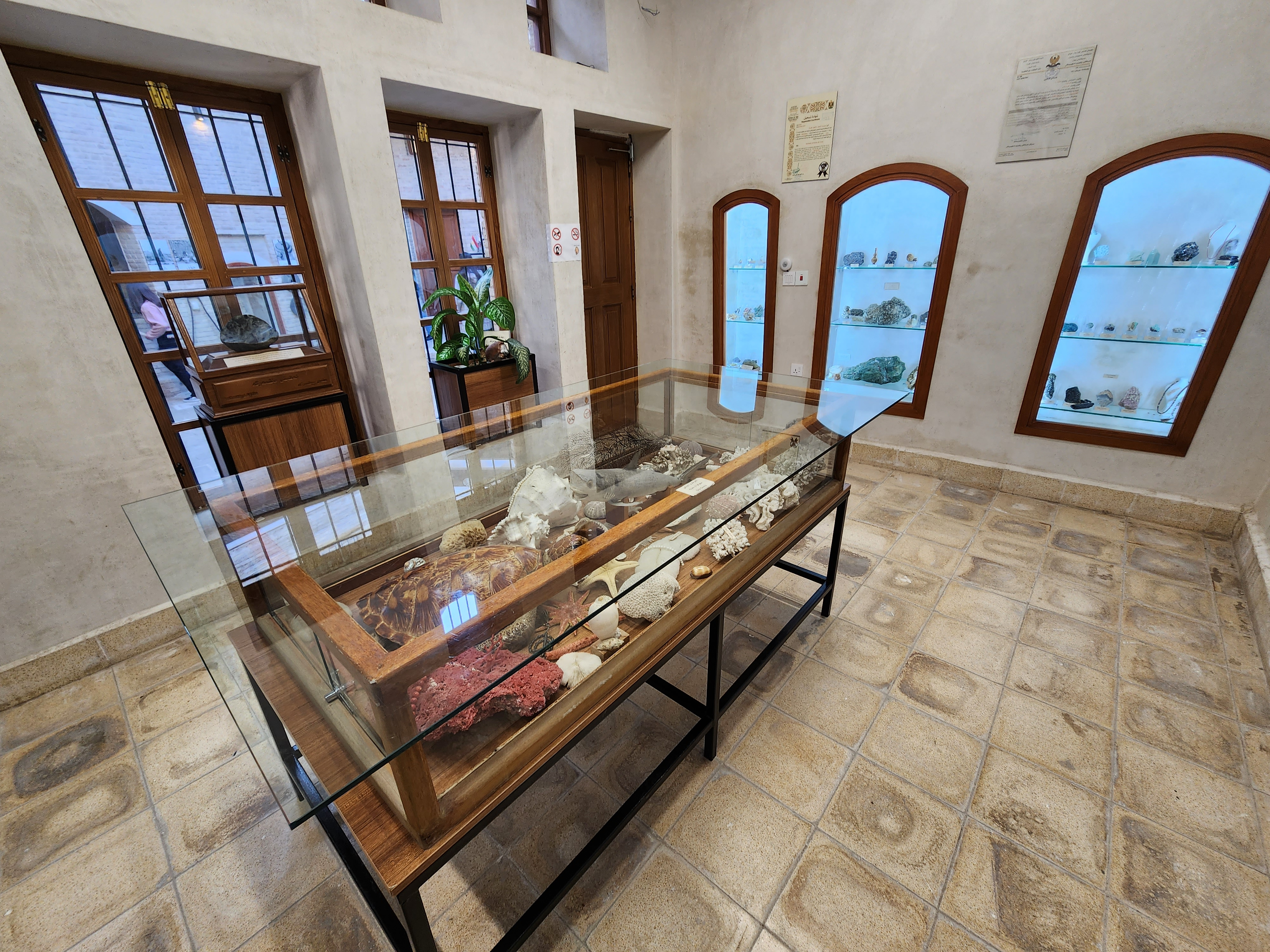
One of the galleries

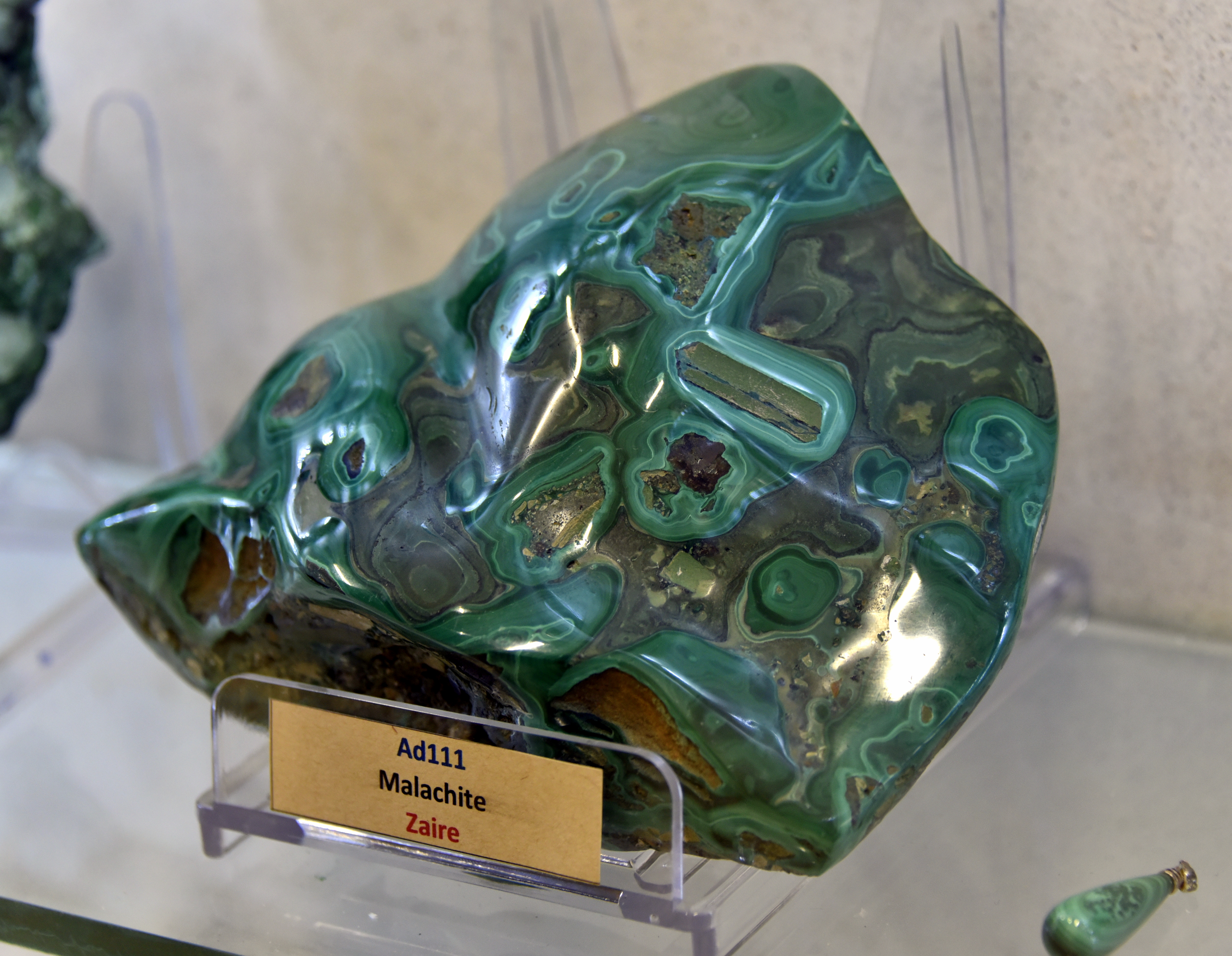
Malachite from Zaire

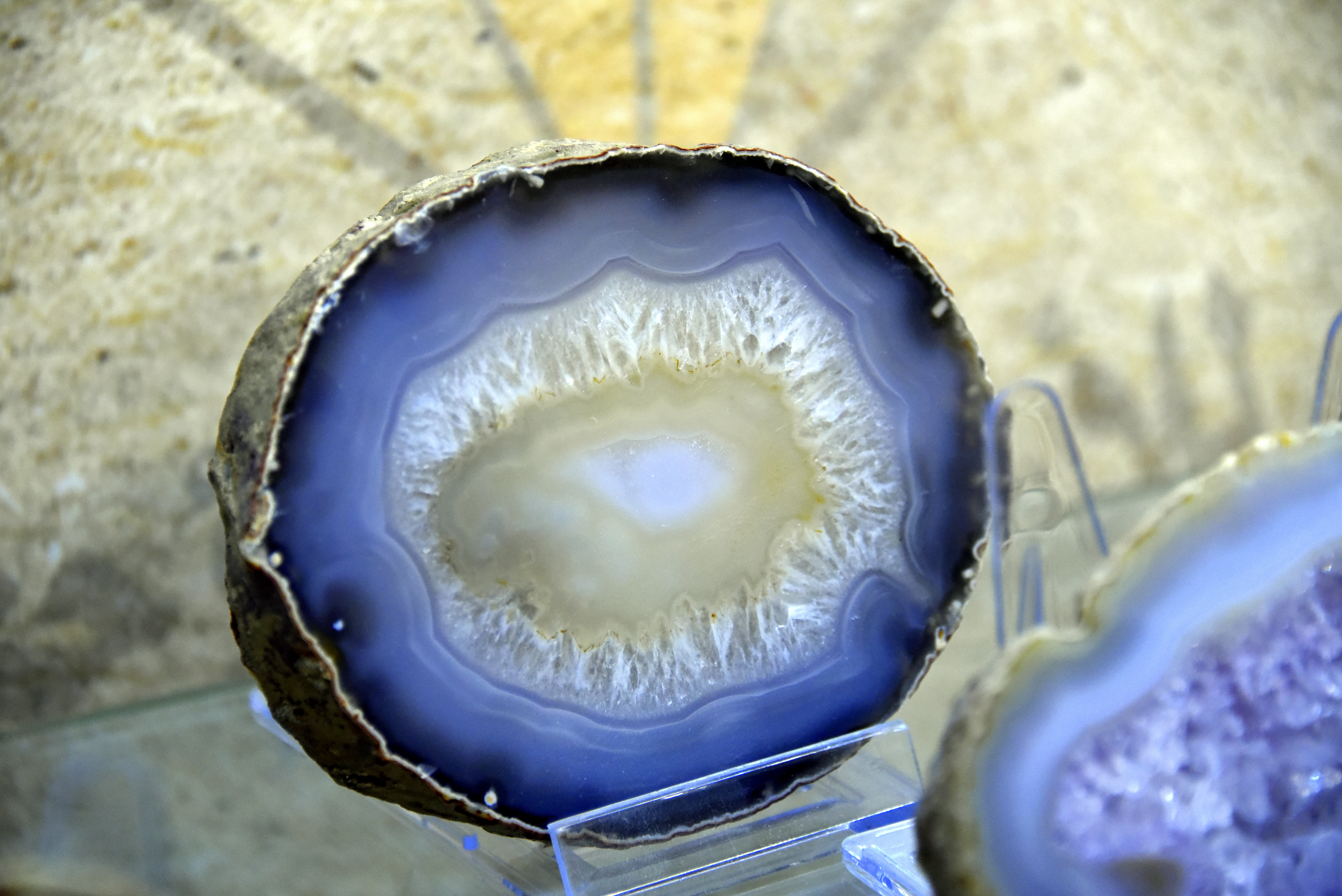
Agate

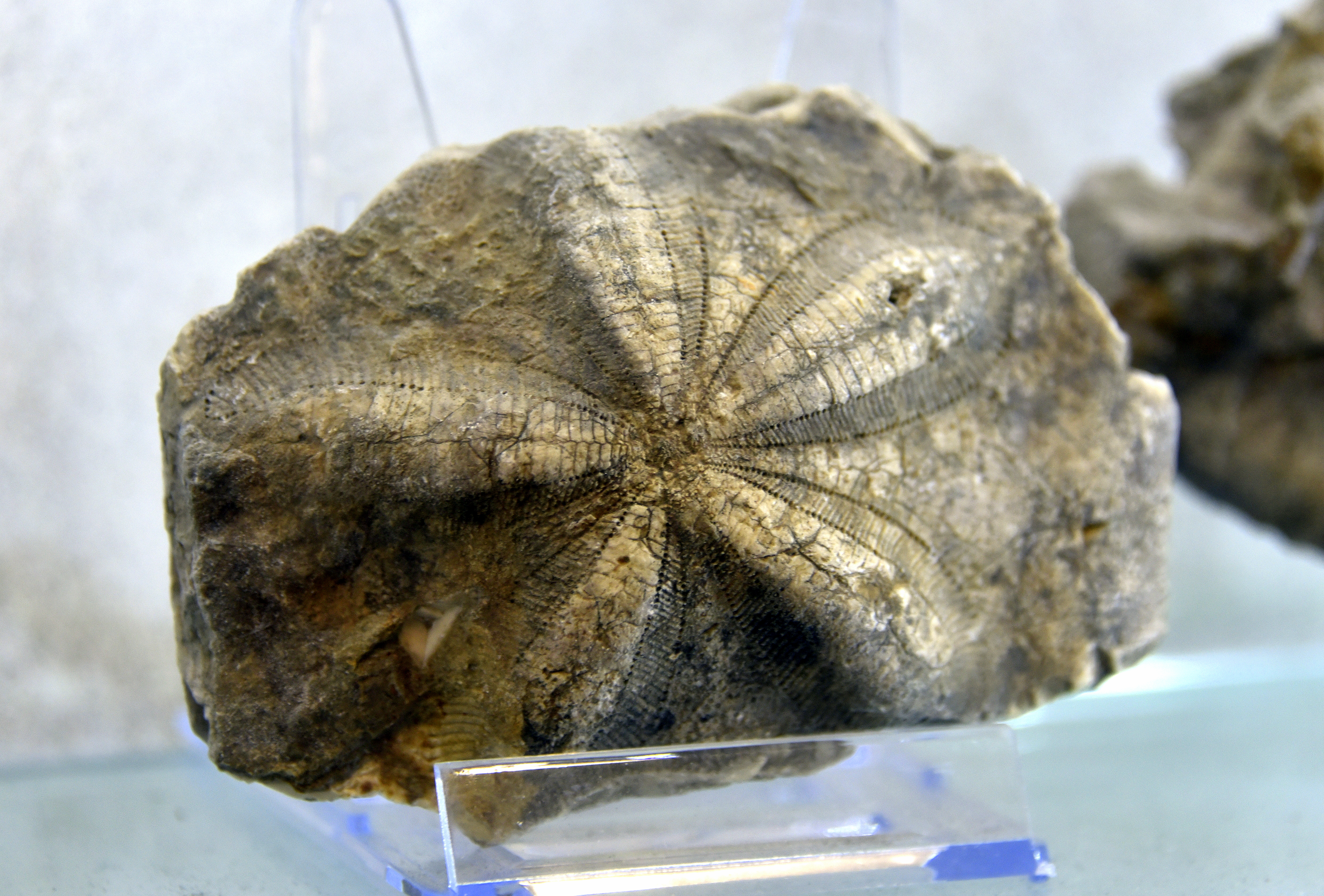
Starfish fossil

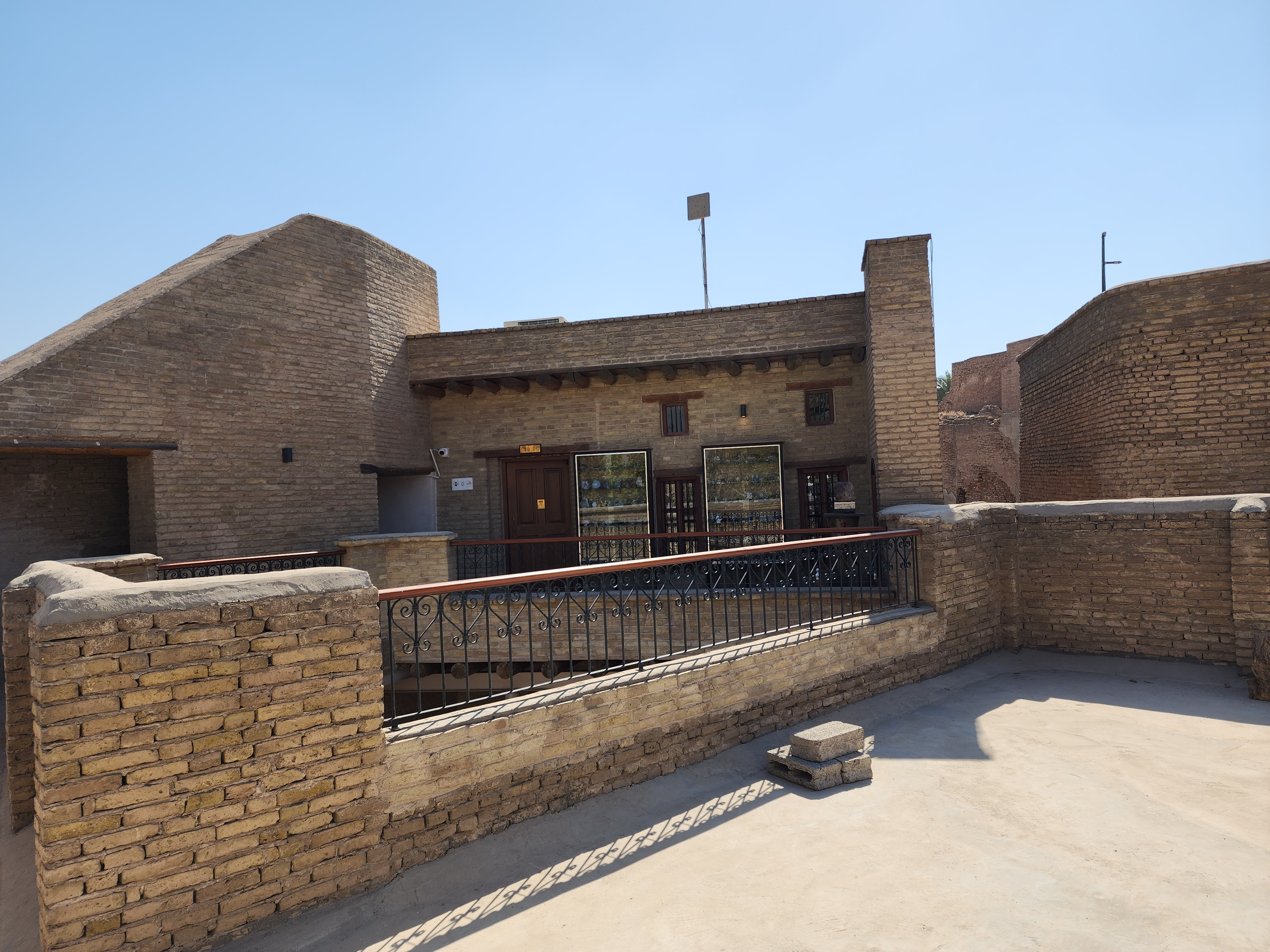
The museum's shop on the upper floor

== See also ==
- Turkmen Heritage House
