= Hormisdas Djibri =

Bishop of Chaldean Catholic Church (1872–1953)

Hormisdas Etienne Jabri (Estefan Jabri)
- Bishop of Kirkuk
- Church: Chaldean Catholic Church
- Appointed: 31 August 1917
- Term ended: 18 July 1953
- Predecessor: Theodore Massaieh
- Successor: Raphael Rabban

Orders
- Ordination: 4 June 1893 (Priest)
- Consecration: 30 Nov 1902 (Bishop) by Yousef VI Thomas

Personal details
- Born: 8 January 1872 Mosul
- Died: 18 July 1953 (aged 81)

Hormisdas Etienne Djibri [or Stephen Jibri (Mutran Estefan Jabri)], 1872–1953) was Archbishop of Kirkuk, Sulaimaniya and Arbil of the Chaldean Catholic Church from 1917 until his death in 1953. Making him the longest serving archbishop of the Chaldean church with 46 years of service.

== Life ==
Hormisdas Etienne Djibri (Mutran Estefan Jabri) was born in Mosul on 8 January 1872. He was ordained a priest on 4 June 1893. He was appointed auxiliary bishop of Kirkuk and consecrated bishop on 30 Nov 1902 by Patriarch Yousef VI Emmanuel II Thomas.

On 31 July 1917, Archbishop Estefan Jabri succeeded Theodore Massaieh as Archbishop of Kirkuk. He built the Church of Saint Joseph of Kirkuk, the Church of Saint Georgis of Inkawa, the Arbil Chaldean church and the church of Saint Mary in Shaqlawa. He refurbished many of existing Chaldean churches as well as preserving the heritage of monasteries, including Rabban Hormiz. He died on 18 July 1953.
