= May 1994 PUK–KDP clashes =

- Part of Iraqi Kurdish Civil War
Date	1 May – 1 June 1994
Location	Iraqi Kurdistan
Result	Indecisive

Belligerents
KDP	PUK

Commanders and leaders
Masoud Barzani	Jalal Talabani

Casualties and losses
- 300 killed

May 1994 PUK–KDP clashes was the first outbreak of violence of the 1994–97 Iraqi Kurdish Civil War, fought in Iraqi Kurdistan between the rival Kurdistan Democratic Party and Patriotic Union of Kurdistan Kurdish factions. The clashes left around 300 people dead. The clashes saw the PUK capture the towns of Shaqlawa and Chamchamal from the KDP. The Battle of Shaqlawa was a significant turning point during this period of conflict.
