= Araden =

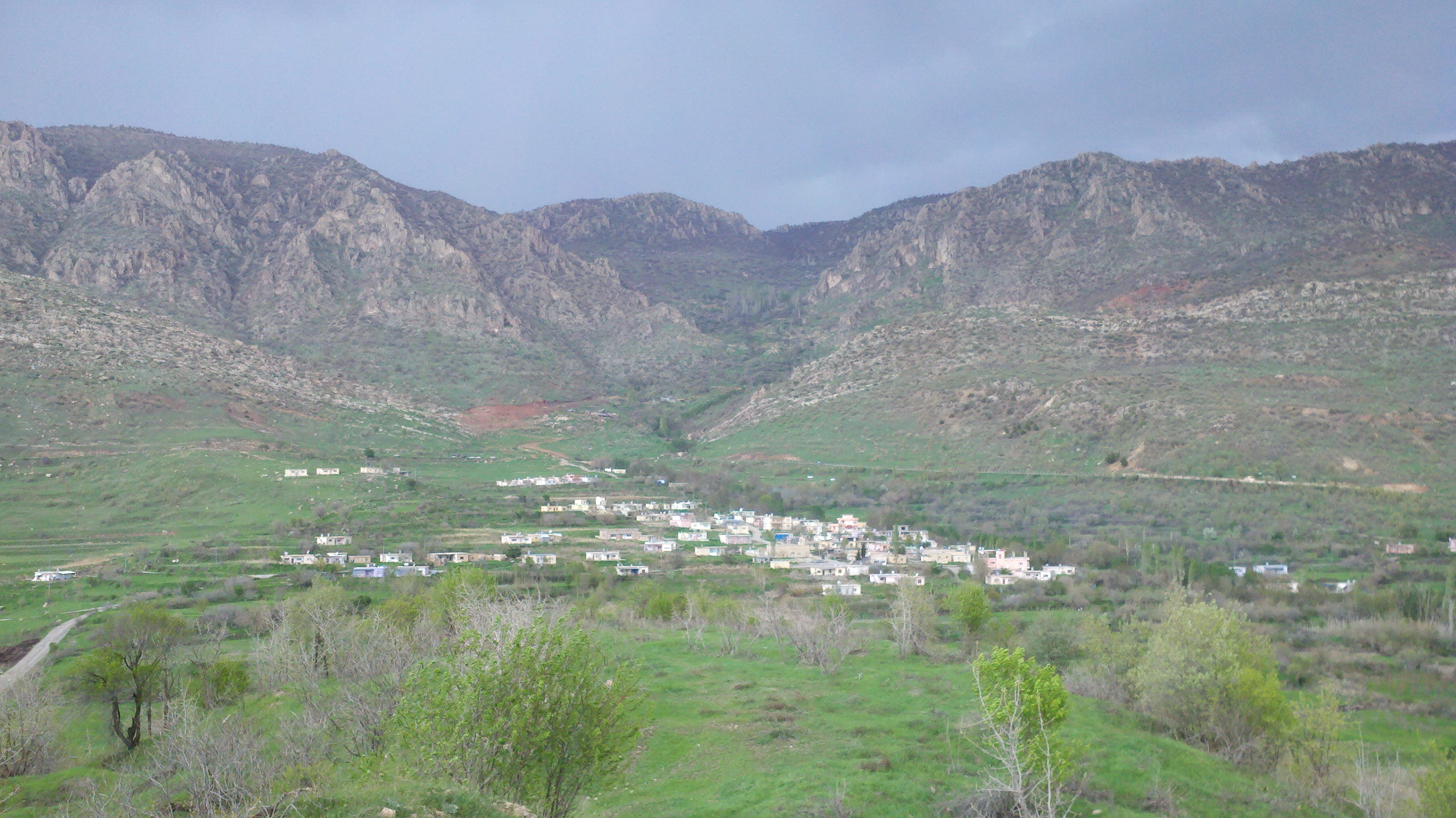

- Location in Kurdistan Region, Iraq Araden (Iraq)
- Coordinates: 37°6′20.24″N 43°19′6.68″E
- Country: Iraq
- Region: Kurdistan Region
- Governorate: Dohuk
- District: Amedi
- Time zone: AST (UTC+3)

Araden (Arabic: أرادن, Kurdish: ئه‌رادن, Syriac: ܐܪܕܢ) (Note: Alternatively transliterated as Aradin.) is a village in Dohuk Governorate in Kurdistan Region, Iraq. It is located in the Sapna valley in the Bamarni Sub-District of Amedi District.

In the village, there are Chaldean Catholic churches of Mart Shmune, Sultana Mahdokht, and Mar Awda. There is also a church of the Sacred Heart of Jesus.

== Etymology ==
According to local tradition, the name of the village is derived from "ara" ("land" in Syriac) and "aden" ("Eden" in Syriac), and thus translates to "land of Eden".

== History ==
It is suggested that one or all of the churches of Mart Shmune, Sultana Mahdokht, and Mar Awda may have been constructed over a thousand years ago. Local tradition attests that the church of Sultana Mahdokht was constructed by a pilgrim who was instructed to build a church there in a dream from the saint after he had discovered a relic of the saint's arm. The population of Araden were likely adherents of the Church of the East long before the 14th century. The village was a notable centre of manuscript production, and the earliest surviving manuscript copied at Araden is dated to 1571.

The inhabitants of Araden were converted to Chaldean Catholicism in the 1830s by Joseph Audo, archbishop of Amadiya, and Dominican missionaries. Therefore, in 1850, 50-75 Chaldean Catholic families inhabited Araden, and were served by two functioning churches and one priest as part of the archdiocese of Amadiya. By 1913, the community had expanded to 650 Chaldean Catholics, with two priests, two schools, and one functioning church. The village was inhabited by 515 Assyrians in c. 1933, and the church of Mart Shmune was rebuilt in 1935. A small Jewish community resided at Araden until their emigration to Israel in 1950-1951.

The village's population fluctuated dramatically, as it grew to approximately 5000 Assyrians, with 474 families, in 1954, then decreased to 1049 people in the census of 1957. At the onset of the First Iraqi–Kurdish War in 1961, Araden was inhabited by c. 3000 people, with 350 families, in which year the village was bombed and then razed by 700 Iraqi government forces, dispersing the villagers, some of whom were killed by government-allied Kurdish irregulars under the leadership of Mahmud Agha Zebari, father of the Kurdish politician Hoshyar Zebari.

At the war's end in 1971, c. 80 families returned to Araden, but most were forced to take refuge elsewhere in 1975 after the resumption of violence with the eruption of the Second Iraqi–Kurdish War. Araden was rebuilt in subsequent years, but its population continued to be targeted, resulting in the murder of three Assyrians in 1974-1975, and assassination of the village mukhtar (headman) Dinkha Eshaya in 1981. The village was completely destroyed and its inhabitants displaced by the Iraqi government in 1987 by which time Araden's population had grown to 220 families, and there were two schools. The churches at Araden were spared destruction after negotiations with the Iraqi forces.

The conclusion of the Gulf War in 1991 spurred some of the village's former inhabitants to return, and a number of houses were rebuilt with the support of Hanna Kello, Chaldean Catholic Archbishop of Amadiya, in 1992-1993. By 2004, Araden's population had grown to 35 families, and in early 2009, 234 displaced Assyrians, with 72 families, resided at Araden. By 2011, the Supreme Committee of Christian Affairs had constructed 90 houses, a school, and hall, restored 25 houses and the churches, and developed the village's infrastructure. The village was populated by 320 Chaldean Catholics in 2012, however, only 46 families reside at Araden as of 2013. It was reported that the vicinity of the village was bombed by the Turkish Air Force after the commencement of Operation Tigris Shield in June 2018, and Turkish airstrikes had disrupted farming. As of 2021, Araden is inhabited by 220 Assyrians with 54 families, all of whom are Chaldean Catholics. Beside Assyrians, the village is populated by Kurds from the Berwarî and Mizîrî tribes.

== Geography ==
Araden has a hot-summer mediterranean climate (Köppen climate classification: Csa). Summers are hot and dry while winters are cold and wet. The village is located at an altitude of 1169m with an average annual temperature of 13.4°C and an annual precipitation of 956mm.

Climate data for Araden
Month	Jan	Feb	Mar	Apr	May	Jun	Jul	Aug	Sep	Oct	Nov	Dec	Year
Mean daily maximum °C (°F)	4.2 (39.6)	6 (43)	10.8 (51.4)	16.9 (62.4)	23.1 (73.6)	30.4 (86.7)	34.7 (94.5)	34.7 (94.5)	29.8 (85.6)	22.3 (72.1)	13.3 (55.9)	7 (45)	19.4 (67.0)
Mean daily minimum °C (°F)	−5.7 (21.7)	−3.9 (25.0)	−0.8 (30.6)	3.5 (38.3)	8.5 (47.3)	13.9 (57.0)	18.1 (64.6)	18.1 (64.6)	13.9 (57.0)	8.4 (47.1)	1 (34)	−4.3 (24.3)	5.9 (42.6)
Average precipitation mm (inches)	157 (6.2)	151 (5.9)	159 (6.3)	130 (5.1)	60 (2.4)	5 (0.2)	1 (0.0)	1 (0.0)	4 (0.2)	52 (2.0)	94 (3.7)	142 (5.6)	956 (37.6)
Average precipitation days	9	9	10	10	7	1	0	0	1	5	6	8	66
Source: Climate Data

== Notable people ==
- Francis David (1870-1939), Chaldean Catholic Archbishop of Amadiya.
- Thomas Reis (1898-1965), Chaldean Catholic Bishop of Zakho.
- André Sana (1920-2013), Chaldean Catholic Archbishop of Kirkuk.

== Gallery ==
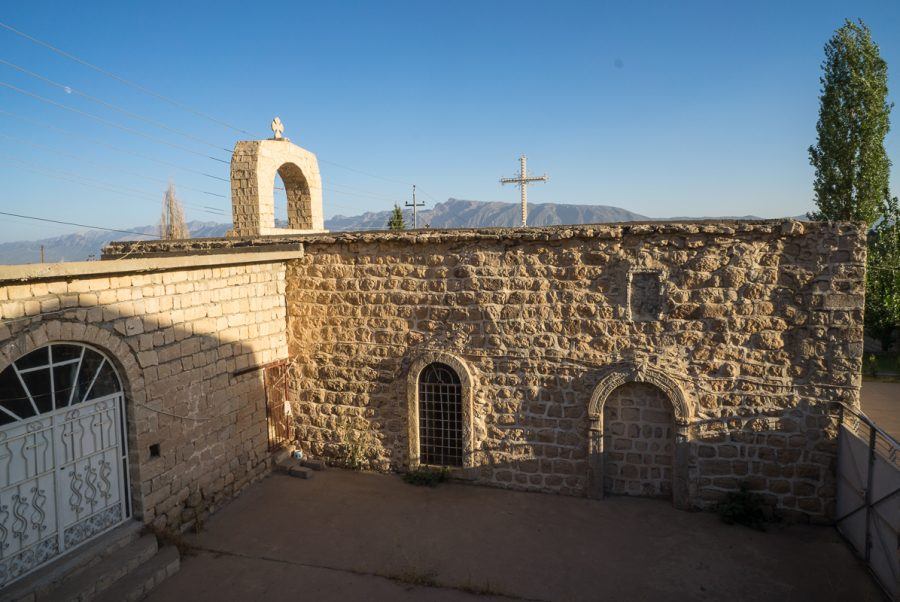
Mart Shmuni Church

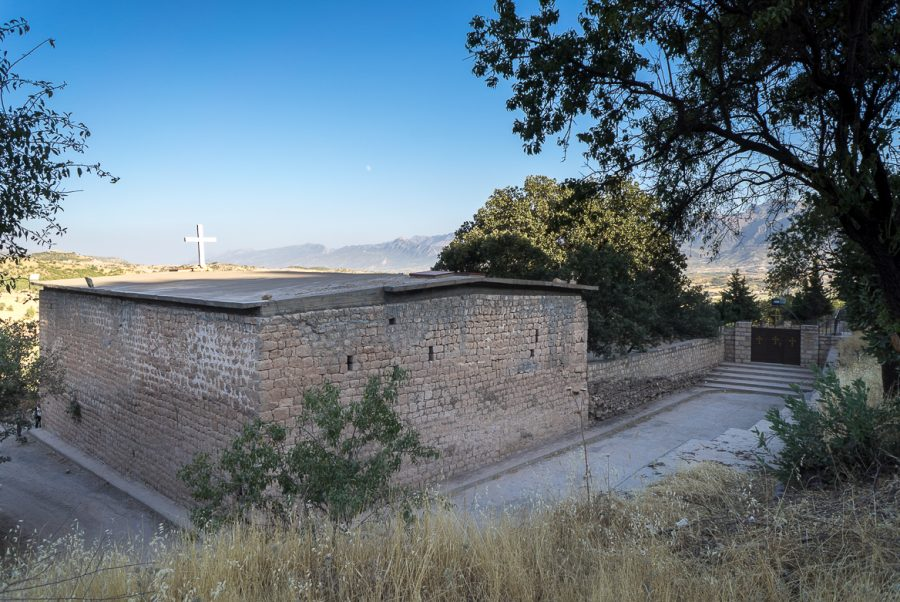
Church of Sultana Mahdokht

== See also ==
- Assyrians in Iraq
- List of Assyrian settlements

== Bibliography ==
- Awde, Nicholas; Lamassu, Nineb; Al-Jeloo, Nicholas (2007). Aramaic (Assyrian/Syriac) Dictionary & Phrasebook. Hippocrene Books.
- Donabed, Sargon George (2010). Iraq and the Assyrian Unimagining: Illuminating Scaled Suffering and a Hierarchy of Genocide from Simele to Anfal (PDF).
- Donabed, Sargon George (2015). Reforging a Forgotten History: Iraq and the Assyrians in the Twentieth Century. Edinburgh University Press.
- Eshoo, Majed (2004). The Fate Of Assyrian Villages Annexed To Today's Dohuk Governorate In Iraq And The Conditions In These Villages Following The Establishment Of The Iraqi State In 1921 (PDF). Translated by Mary Challita.
- Girling, F. Kristian (2015). The Chaldean Catholic Church: A study in modern history, ecclesiology and church-state relations (2003–2013) (PDF).
- KRSO (2009), "2009 - ناوی پاریزگا. يه که کارگيرييه كانی پاریزگاكانی هه ریمی کوردستان" (PDF), Kurdistan Region Statistics Office (KRSO) (in Kurdish), pp. 1–179
- Sabar, Yona (1998). "The Neo-Aramaic Dialect of Aradhin". Mediterranean Language Review. 10. Harrassowitz Verlag: 197–209.
- Wilmshurst, David (2000). The Ecclesiastical Organisation of the Church of the East, 1318–1913. Peeters Publishers.
