= Yousif Thomas Mirkis =

Mgr. Yousif Thomas Mirkis
- Archbishop of Chaldean Catholic Archeparchy of Kirkuk-Sulaimaniya
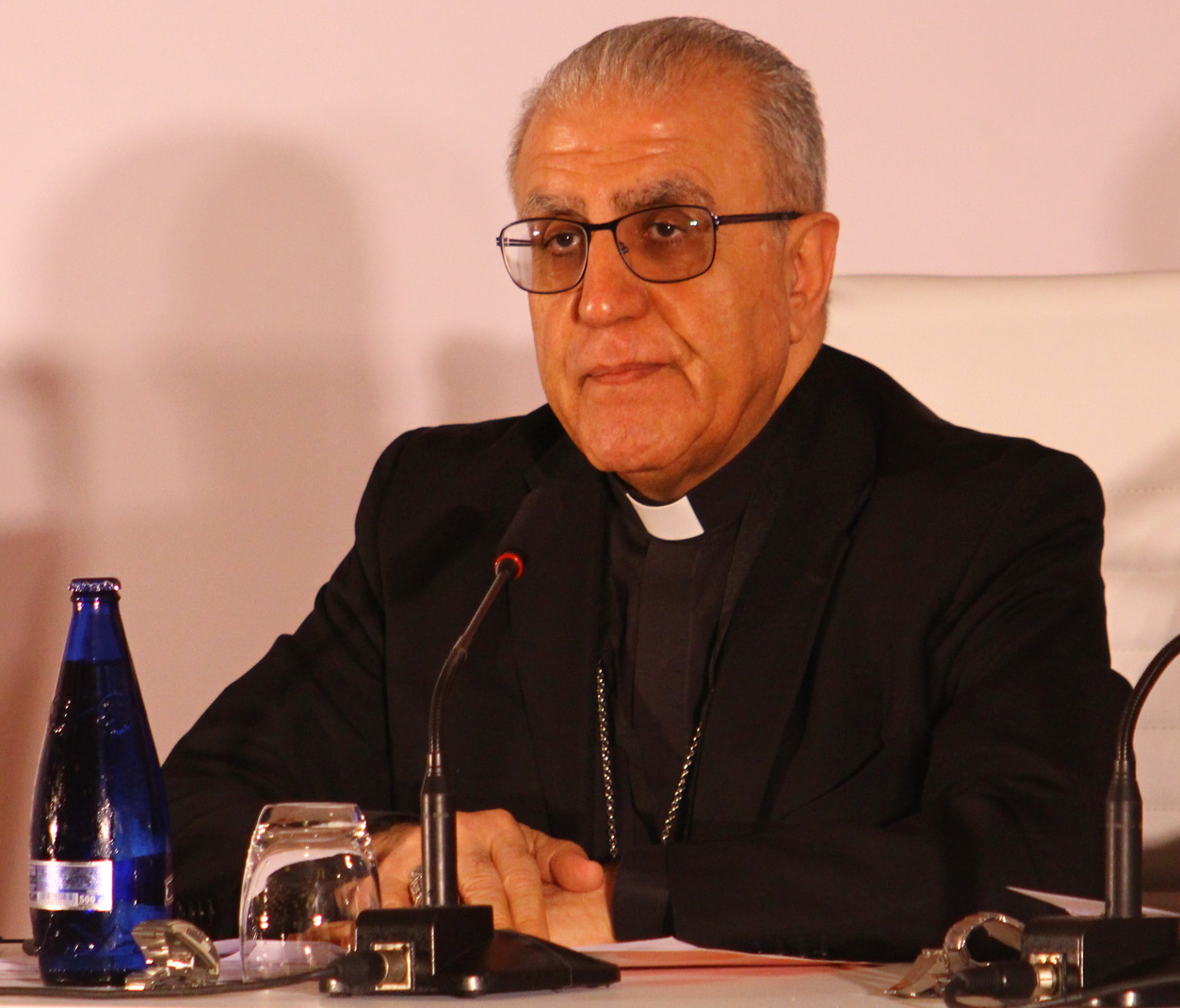
- Yousif Thomas Mirkis
- Diocese: Chaldean Catholic Archeparchy of Kirkuk-Sulaimaniya
- See: Chaldean Catholic Archeparchy of Kirkuk-Sulaimaniya
- Predecessor: Louis Raphaël I Sako
- Successor: Incumbent

Orders
- Ordination: 26 March 1980
- Consecration: 24 January 2014
- Rank: Archbishop of Chaldean Catholic Archeparchy of Kirkuk-Sulaimaniya

Personal details
- Born: 21 June 1949 (age 77) Mosul, Iraq
- Denomination: Chaldean Catholic Church
- Residence: Kirkuk
- Education: University of Strasbourg

Archbishop Mgr. Yousif Thomas Mirkis, is the Archbishop of Chaldean Catholic Archeparchy of Kirkuk-Sulaimaniya whose cathedral, St Paul's, was repeatedly bombed and rebuilt by Islamic State in the early 2000s. He announced a policy of starting a new university in Iraq, and has been described as a both a journalist and a human rights activist; he organised the purchase of Kirkuk's first Ultrasound system.

Yousif Thomas Mirkis studied first at the Saint - John Seminary in Mosul, then continued his studies in France where he joined the Dominican Order. He made his first profession in the Order in 1975. At the University of Strasbourg, he obtained a doctorate in theology and religious history. Then he also obtained a degree in social anthropology at the University of Nanterre 1.

He is ordained priest on 26 March 1980.

Intellectual Professions In 1989, Father Mirkis co-founded the Theological and Philosophical Faculty of Babel College in Baghdad, where he taught from 1989 to 2014 . In 1995, he became director of magazines Al-Fiker Al-Masihi and Al-Nasira. In 2006, he founded the Academy of Human Sciences in Baghdad. He is also a member of the Union of Iraqi Journalists, "Third World Journalists" based in Berlin and the International Catholic Press Union 1.

He is fluent in Arabic, French and English and also knows Aramaic 1.

He held the office of superior of the Dominicans in Baghdad.

He was elected archbishop of Kirkuk by the synod of bishops of the Chaldean Church on 10 June 2013. Pope Francis confirmed his election on 11 January 2014. He was consecrated on 24 January 2014 by Patriarch Louis Raphael I St Sako, assisted by Mgr. Shlemon Warduni and Mgr. Jean Benjamin Sleiman and chose the motto "Do not be afraid, O little flock."
