= Armota =

Village in Iraq

- Location in Iraq Armota (Iraqi Kurdistan)
- Coordinates: 36°4′1″N 44°36′29″E
- Country: Iraq
- Region: Kurdistan Region
- Governorate: Erbil Governorate
- District: Koy Sanjaq District

Armota is a village in Erbil Governorate in Kurdistan Region, Iraq. (Note: (Arabic: أرموطا; Kurdish: هەرمۆتە; Syriac: ܐܪܡܘܬܐ) Alternatively transliterated as Harmota, Armouta, or Armūṭā.) It is located in the Koy Sinjaq District. In the village, there is a church of Mart Mariam, a church of Mar Michael, and a shrine to Mart Shmune.

== Etymology ==
Several theories have been put forward for the origin of the Syriac name of the village, as it may derive from "ara" ("land" in Syriac) and "mota" ("death" in Syriac), and thus translate to "land of death", or could be a combination of "ara" and "nūṭā" ("oil" in Syriac), and translate to "land of oil". The former etymology is attributed to the local legend of a large battle between Christians and Muslims, or of a plague that devastated the village. Alternatively, Armota may stem from "armune" ("pomegranate" in Syriac).

== History ==
The Monastery of Mar Behnam at Armota was established in the fourth century. According to local tradition, Armota was extant at the time of the Muslim conquest of Mesopotamia in 638, and paid jizya to the Muslim army led by Sa'd ibn Abi Waqqas that had encamped near the village at a site called tent hill. The inhabitants of Armota were adherents of the Church of the East until converted to Chaldean Catholicism in 1779 by Archbishop Yohannan Hormizd. There were 25-38 Assyrian families in the village in 1843, with one priest and one church. In 1868, the Church of Mart Mariam at Armota was constructed.

In 1913, 100 Chaldean Catholics populated Armota, and were served by one priest and one functioning church as part of the archdiocese of Kirkuk. The village was pillaged in 1943, and again later in 1963 by Iraqi soldiers during the First Iraqi–Kurdish War, at which time it was inhabited by 105 Assyrian families. The Church of Mart Mariam was renovated in 1979. The village was used as a military camp by the Iraqi army in 1988 during the Al-Anfal campaign. The Monastery of Mar Behnam was also destroyed by Iraqi soldiers in 1988.

The Monastery of Mar Behnam was partially rebuilt and reopened on 12 April 1996. The unannounced construction of a mosque at Armota by the Muslim Brotherhood in 1999 led to tensions between Assyrians and Kurds in the area as no Muslims inhabited the village at that time, and after Assyrian protests at Koy Sanjaq it was agreed that the mosque would remain, but the minaret and other additional buildings would not be built, and the call to prayer would not be permitted. The village was solely inhabited by Assyrians until settled by Kurds in the late 20th/early 21st century. By 2003, the population had declined to 70 families.

In the aftermath of the 2003 invasion of Iraq, Assyrians from urban centres fled to Armota to escape insurgent attacks. The infrastructure of the village was developed with investment from the Assyrian politician Sarkis Aghajan Mamendo in the 2000s. The Church of Mart Mariam was renovated again in 2009. In 2012, 99 Assyrian families, including 40 Chaldean families, and 27 Kurdish families, resided in the village, and the Assyrian population grew to 118 families by March 2018. The village was bombarded by Iranian artillery on 8 September 2018, and its population took refuge in Koy Sanjaq. The Assyrian population in the village largely speak Kurdish, but some continue to speak Syriac. As of February 2021, Armota is inhabited by 432 Assyrians.

== Gallery ==
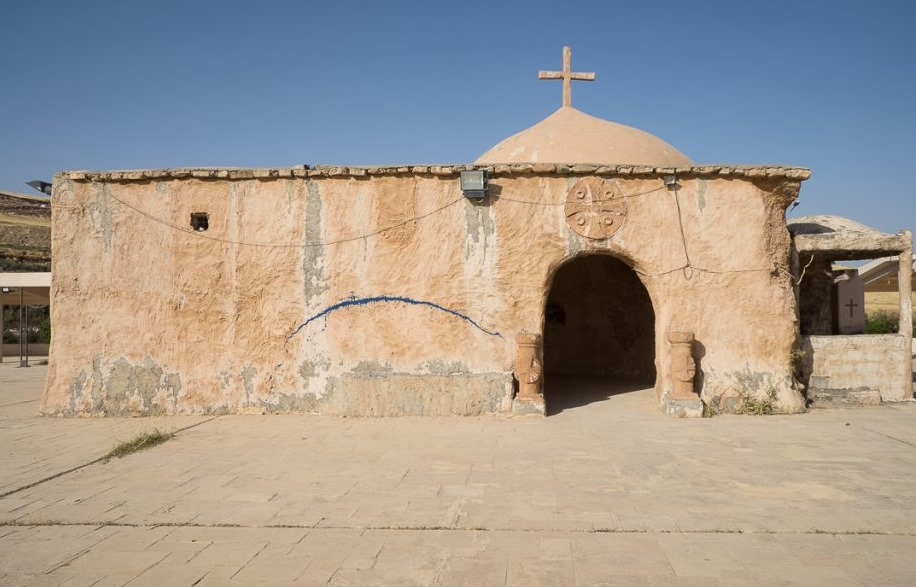
Church of Mar Behnam

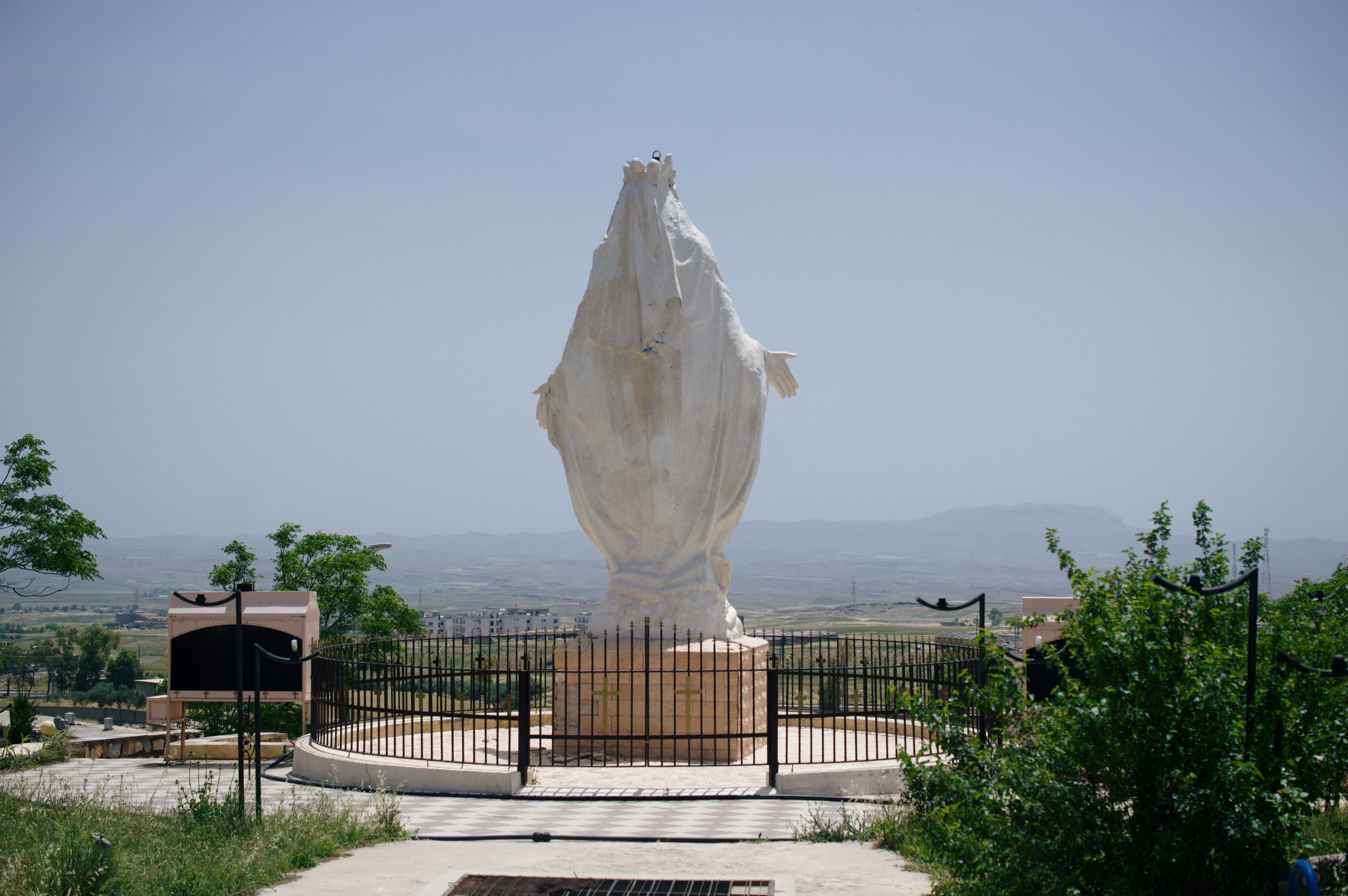

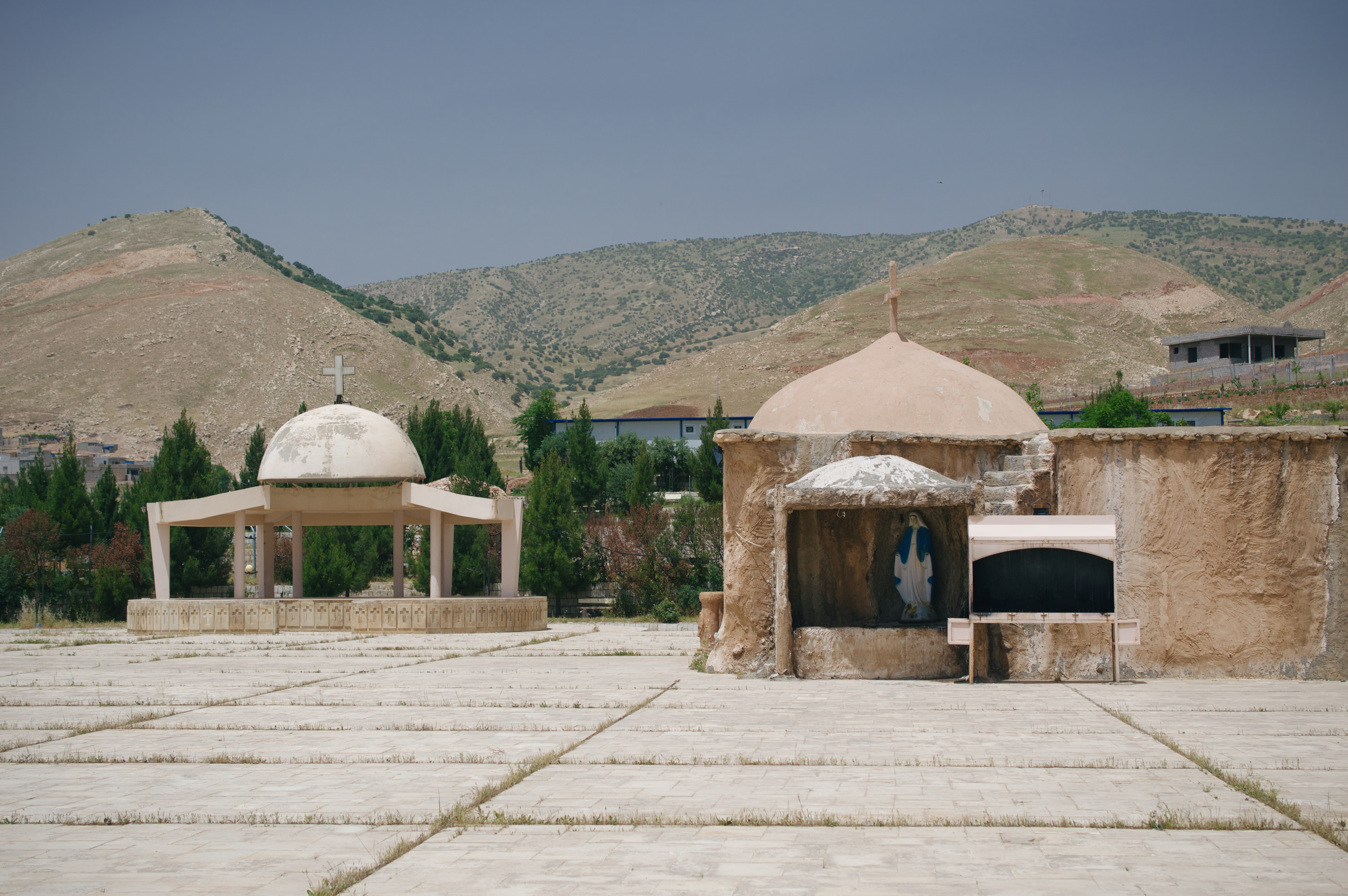

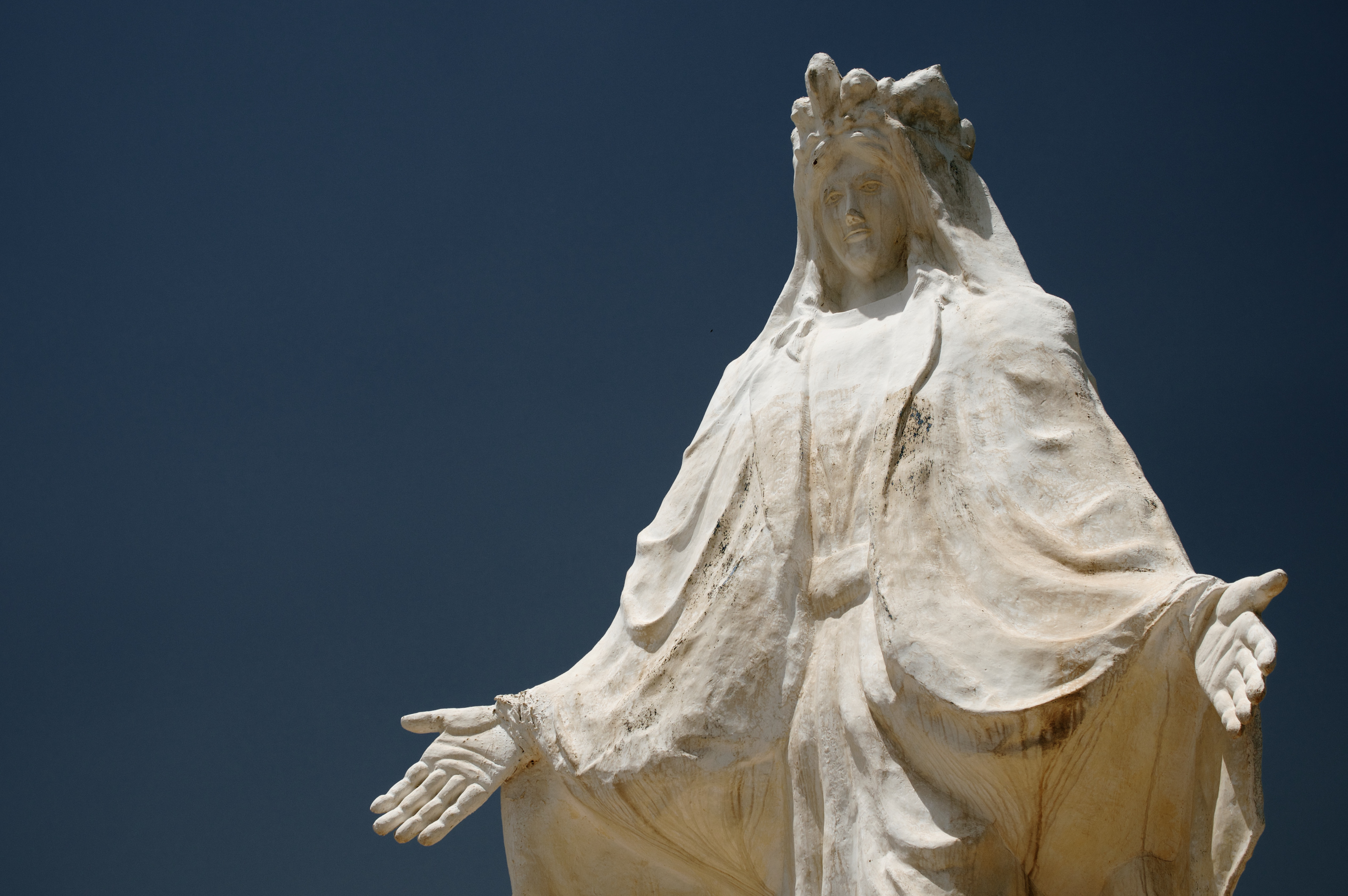

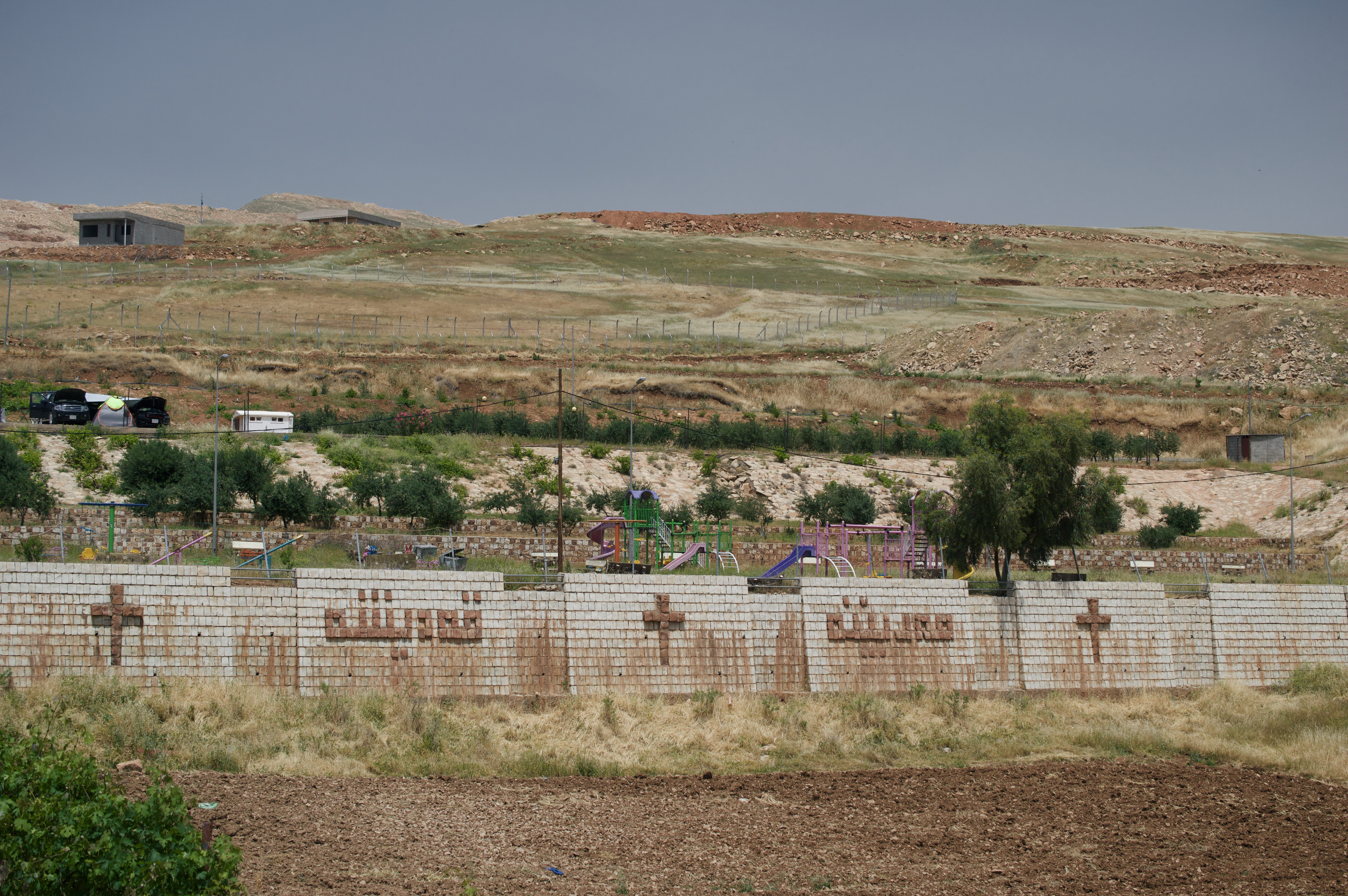

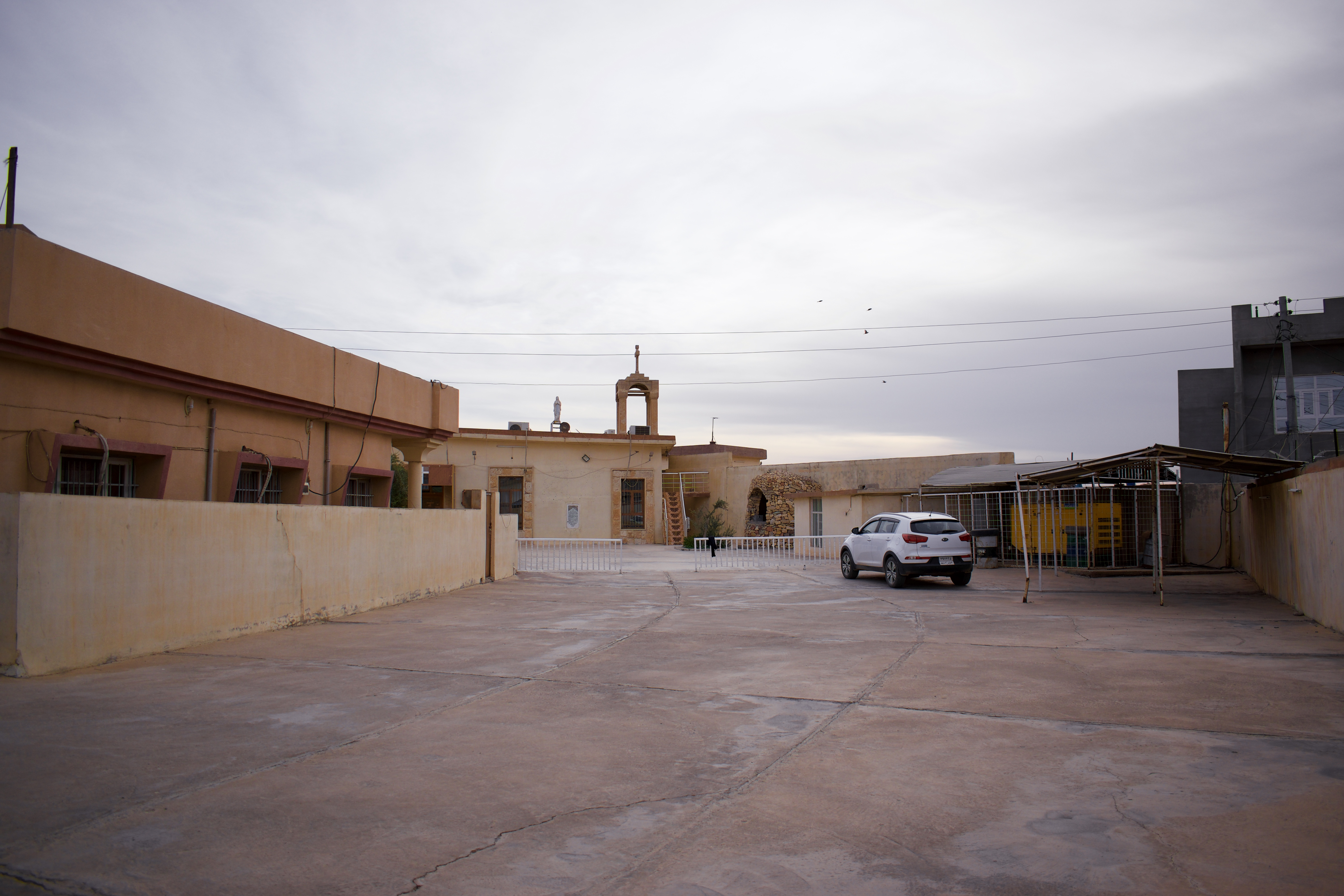

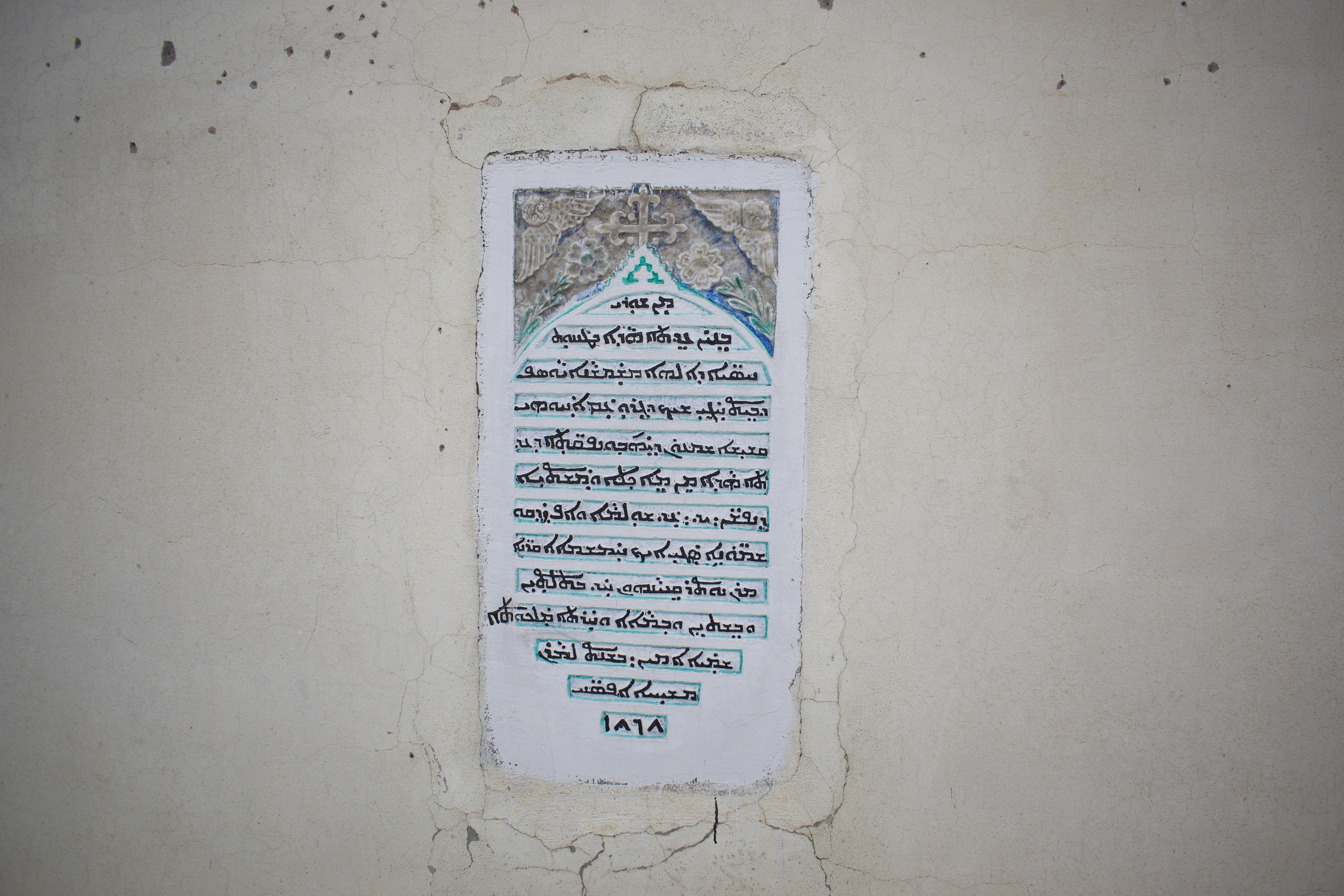

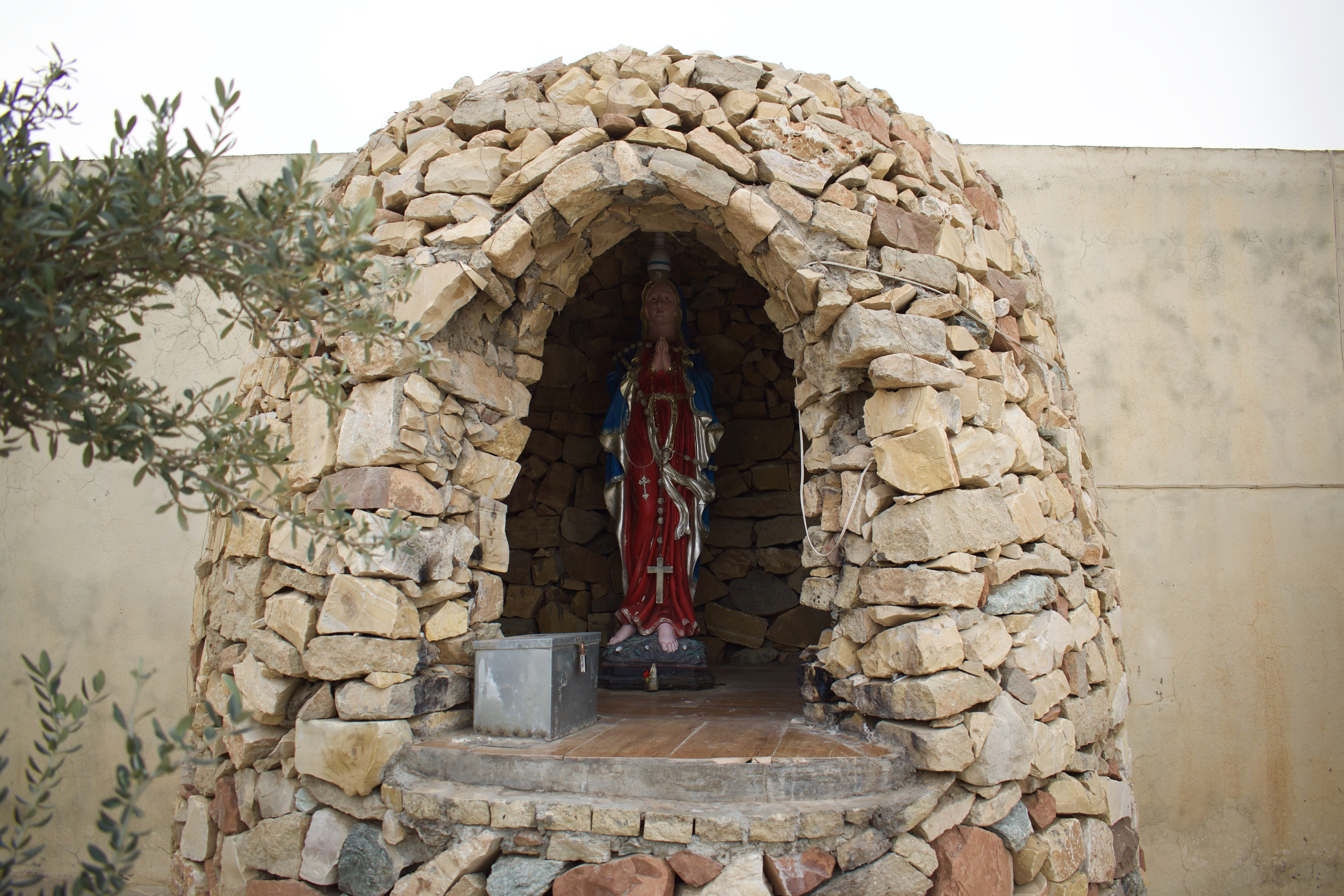

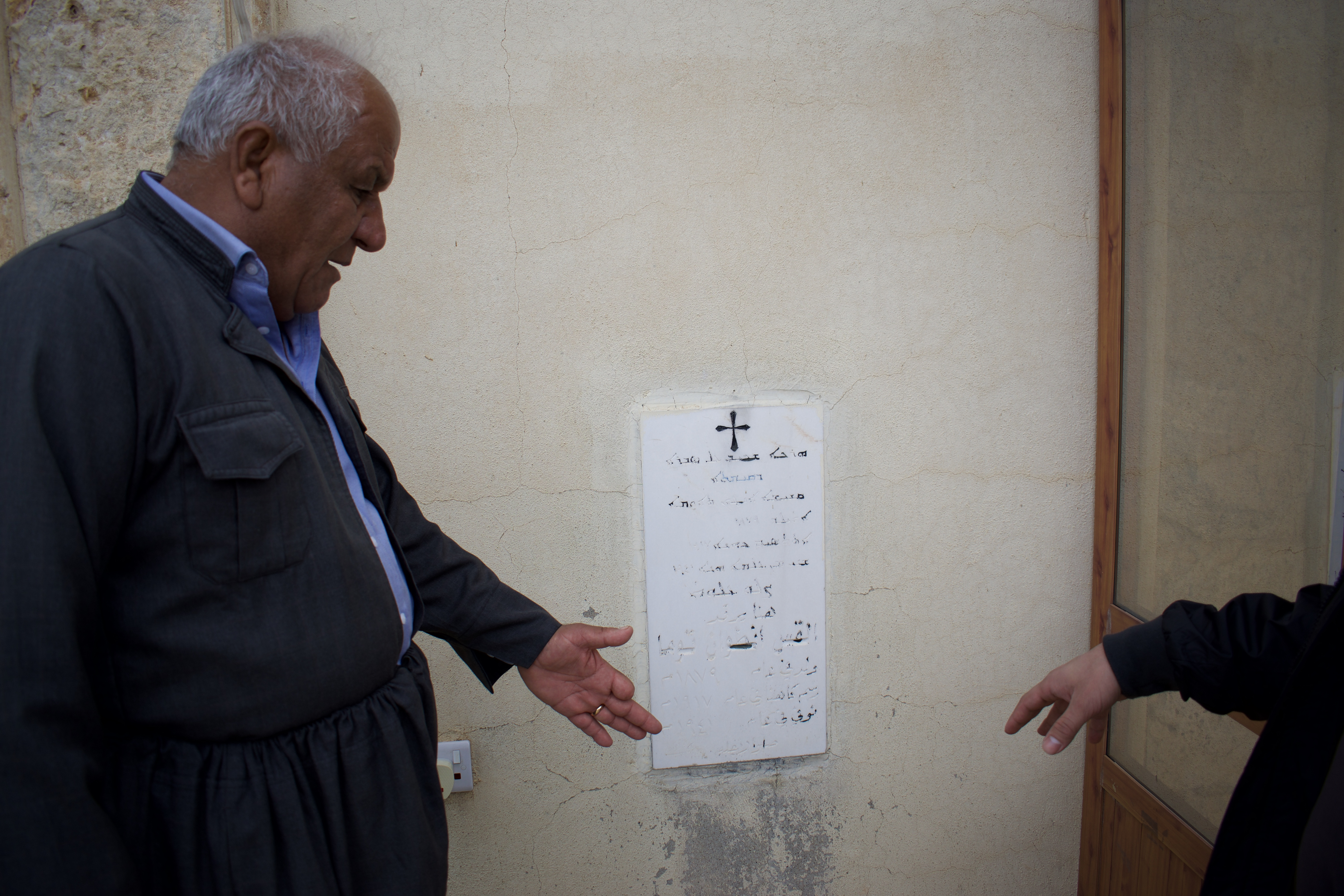

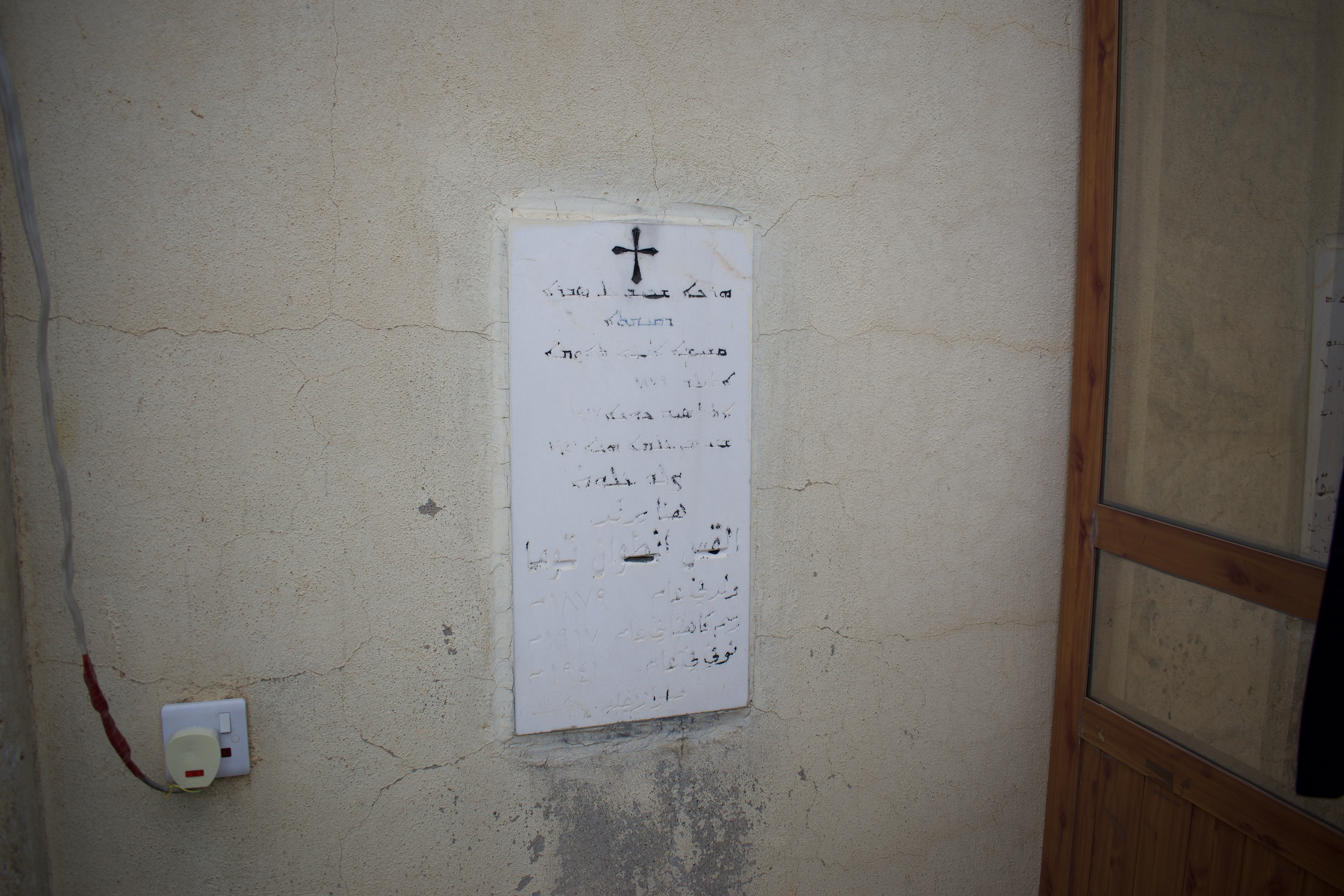

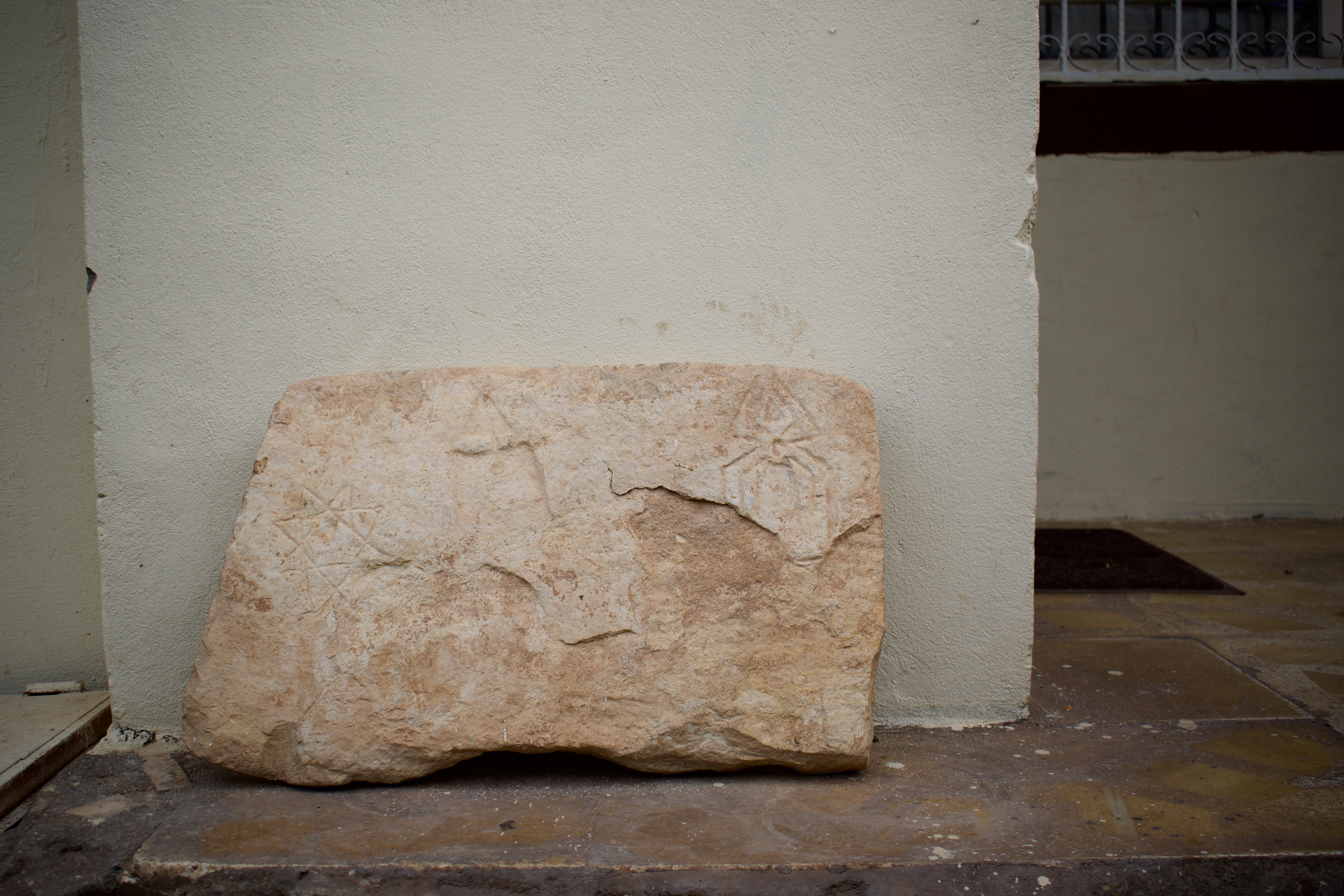

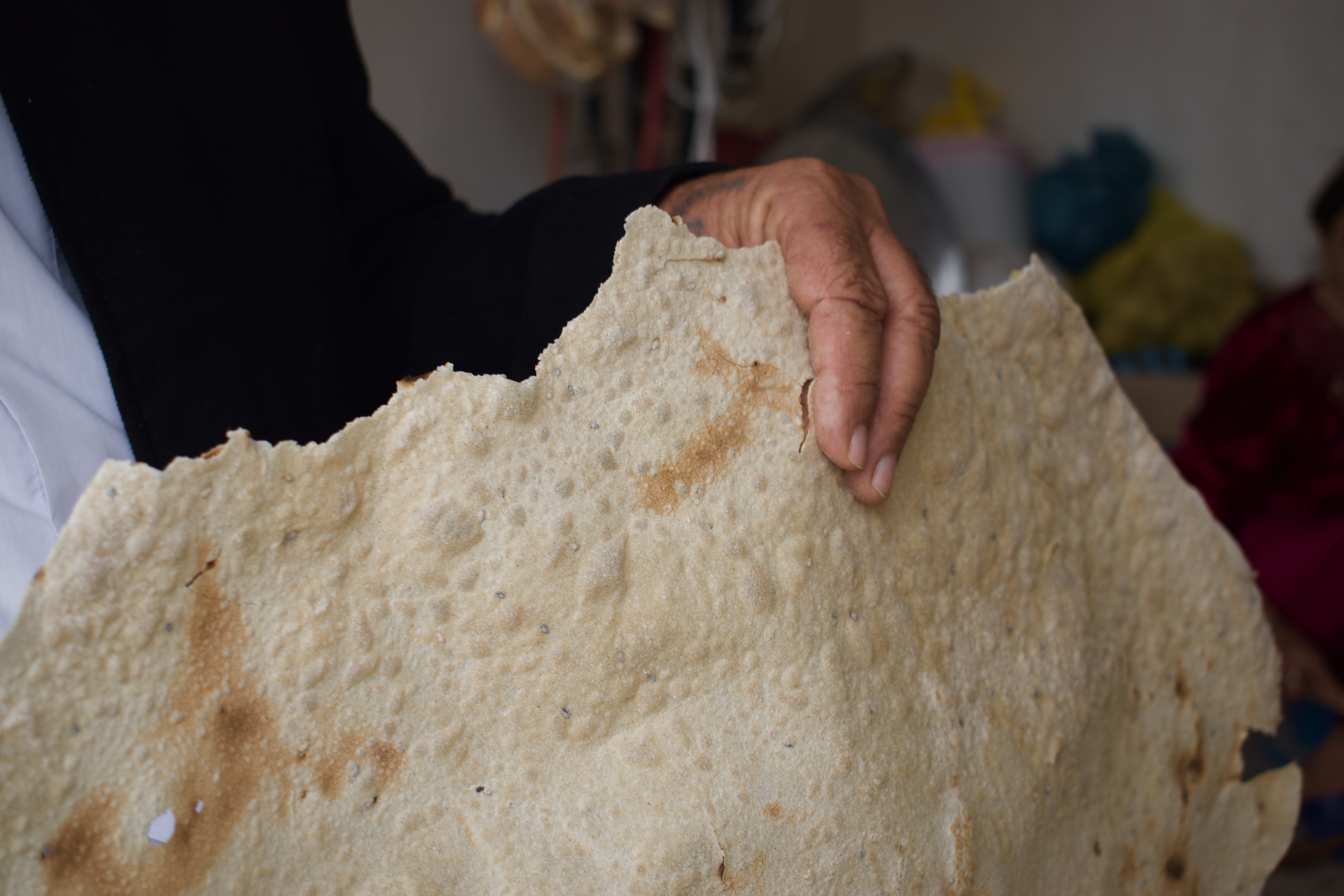

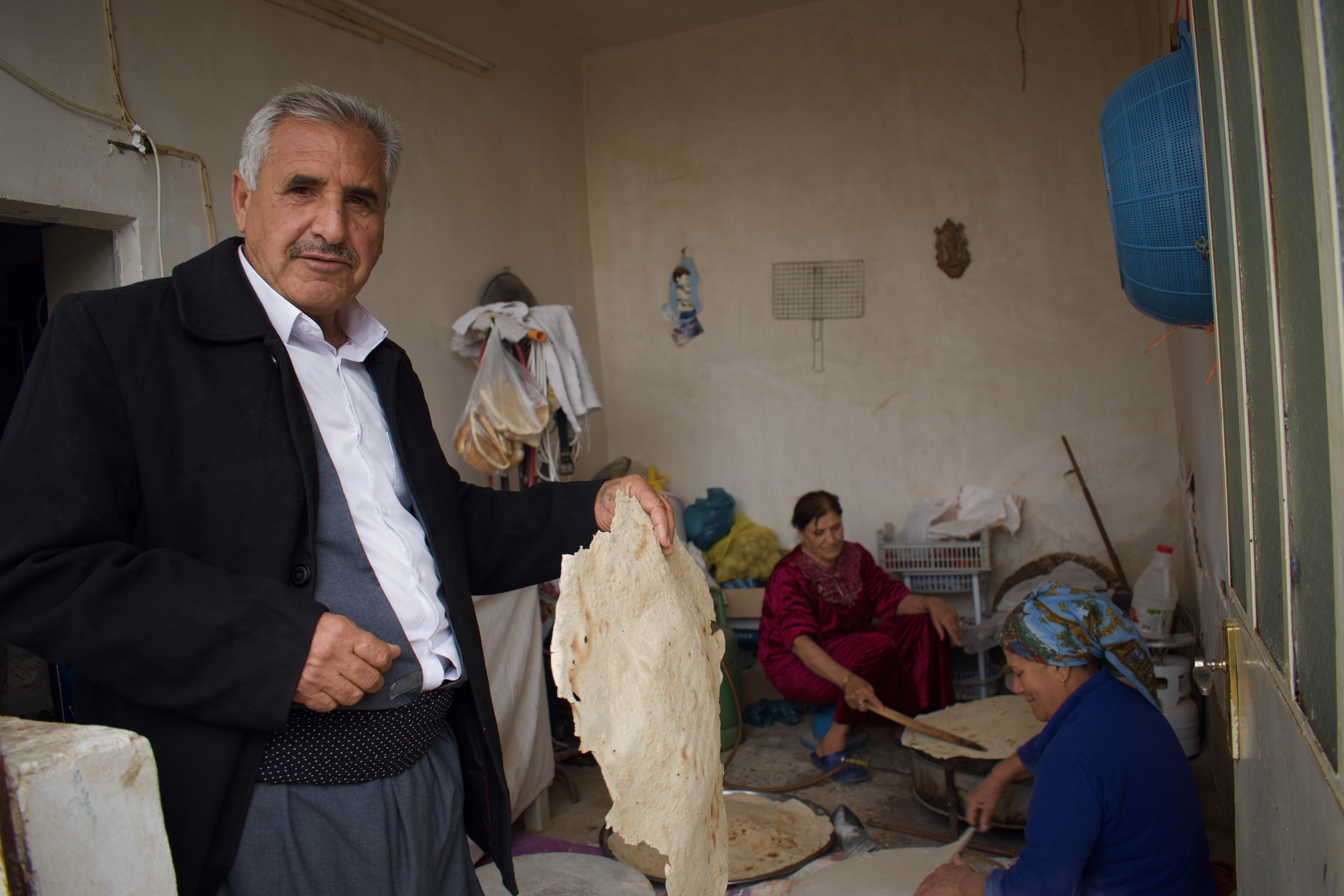

== Bibliography ==
- Awde, Nicholas; Lamassu, Nineb; Al-Jeloo, Nicholas (2007). Aramaic (Assyrian/Syriac) Dictionary & Phrasebook. Hippocrene Books.
- Donabed, Sargon George (2015). Reforging a Forgotten History: Iraq and the Assyrians in the Twentieth Century. Edinburgh University Press.
- Lalik, Krzysztof (2018). "Ethnic and Religious Factors of Chaldo-Assyrian Identity in an Interface with the Kurds in Iraqi Kurdistan". In Joanna Bocheńska (ed.). Rediscovering Kurdistan's Cultures and Identities: The Call of the Cricket. Springer.
- Wilmshurst, David (2000). The Ecclesiastical Organisation of the Church of the East, 1318–1913 (PDF). Peeters Publishers.
