= Antoine Audo =

Syrian Chaldean Catholic bishop (born 1946)

Most Reverend Antoine Audo, S.J.
- Bishop of Aleppo
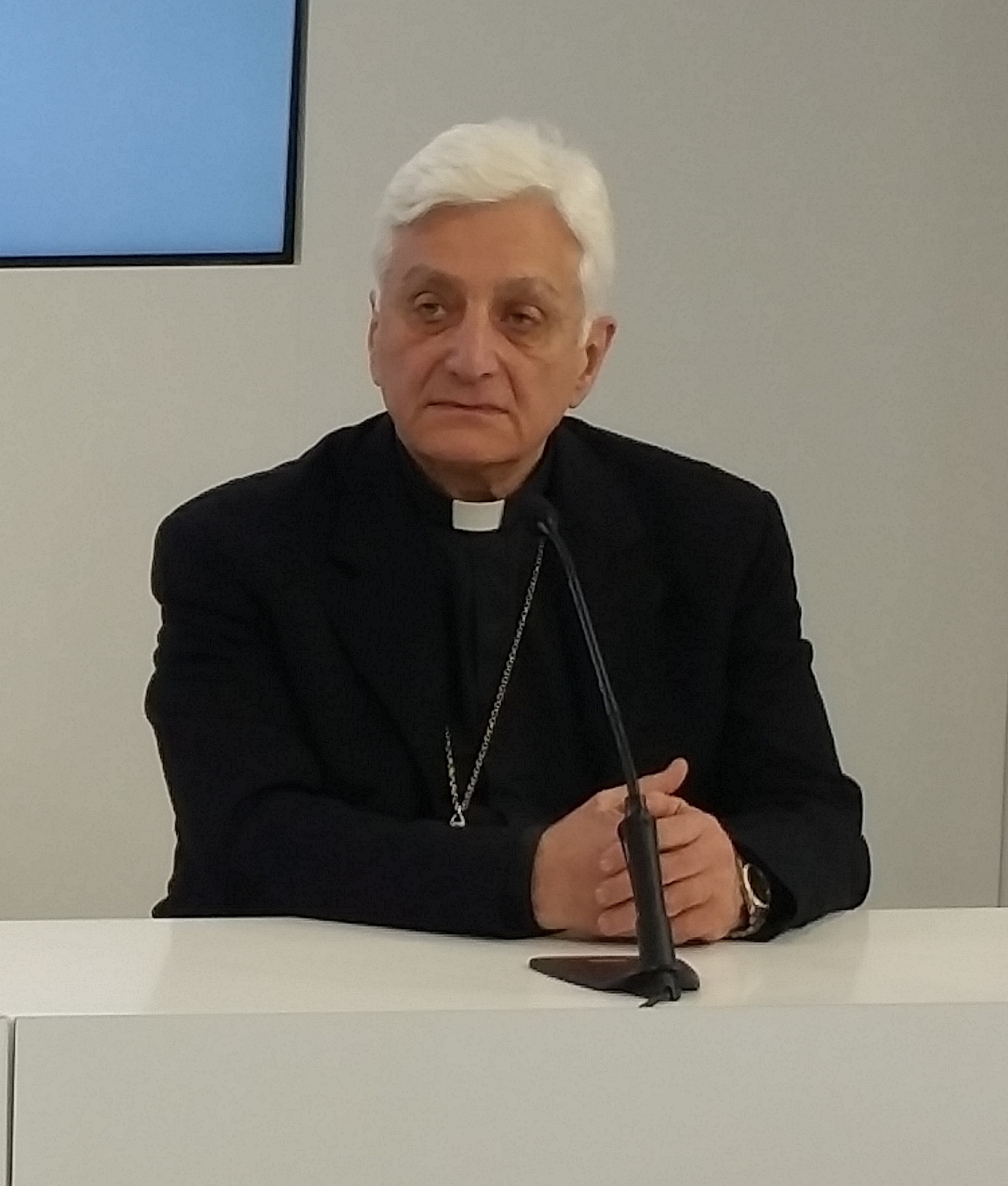
- Church: Chaldean Catholic Church
- Installed: 18 January 1992
- Predecessor: Stéphane Bello

Orders
- Ordination: 5 August 1979
- Consecration: 11 October 1992 by Raphael I Bidawid

Personal details
- Born: Antoine Audo; 3 January 1946 (age 80) Aleppo, First Syrian Republic
- Education: Sorbonne Nouvelle University

Antoine Audo S.J. (born 3 January 1946) is a Syrian Chaldean Catholic hierarch, who has served as the Bishop of the Chaldean Catholic Eparchy of Aleppo since 1992. He is a prominent international voice regarding the humanitarian situation in Syria and served for several terms as the President of Caritas Syria.

== Biography ==
Antoine Audo was born on 3 January 1946, in Aleppo, Syria, but his parents hail from Alqosh, Iraq. He joined the Society of Jesus and was ordained to the priesthood on 5 August 1979. He made an advanced academic studies in France, completing a doctorate at the Sorbonne Nouvelle University in 1979 with a thesis on the philosophical thought of Zaki al-Arsuzi.

On 18 January 1992, he was elected Bishop of Aleppo by the Chaldean Synod. His election was confirmed by Pope John Paul II. He received his episcopal consecration on 11 October 1992 from Patriarch Raphael I Bidawid.

Throughout the Syrian civil war, Audo remained in Aleppo, coordinating emergency relief through Caritas Syria. On 29 January 2011, Pope Benedict XVI appointed him a member of the Pontifical Council for the Pastoral Care of Migrants and Itinerant People. He was a participant in the electoral Synod of Bishops of the Chaldean Catholic Church in January 2013, which elected the new Patriarch Louis Raphaël I Sako and in 2018, he participated in the ad limina visit of the Chaldean Catholic bishops to Pope Francis.

He has frequently addressed the international community, advocating for political solutions and humanitarian aid to preserve the Christian presence in the Middle East.
