= Chaldean Catholic Archeparchy of Kirkuk-Sulaimaniya =

Eastern Catholic archeparchy in Iraq

The Chaldean Catholic Archeparchy of Kirkuk (Arabic: ابرشية كركوك الكلدانية) is an archeparchy of the Chaldean Catholic Church in communion with the Pope in Rome. The archeparchy was created in the early years of the nineteenth century. Its present ordinary, Archbishop Yousif Thomas Mirkis, was consecrated in 2014.

== Background ==
The Chaldean archdiocese of Kirkuk was the successor to the earlier diocese of Karka d'Beth Slokh, the metropolis of the ecclesiastical province of Beth Garmaï. The region of Beth Garmaï in southern Iraq, bounded by the Lesser Zab and Diyala rivers and centered on the town of Karka d'Beth Slokh (modern Kirkuk), was a metropolitan province of the Church of the East between the fifth and fourteenth centuries, whose metropolitans resided first at Shahrgard, then at Karka d'Beth Slokh, later at Shahrzur and finally at Daquqa. The known suffragan dioceses of Beth Garmaï included Shahrgard, Lashom, Mahoze d'Arewan, Radani, Hrbath Glal, Tahal and Shahrzur.

The last known metropolitan of Beth Garmaï is attested in the thirteenth century and the last known bishop in 1318, though the historian ʿAmr continued to describe Beth Garmai as a metropolitan province as late as 1348. It is not clear when the province ceased to exist, but the campaigns of Timur Leng between 1390 and 1405 offer a reasonable context. A small Assyrian Church of the East community persisted at Kirkuk between the fifteenth and eighteenth centuries, some of whose scribes are known. Kirkuk was probably part of the Assyrian Church of the East diocese of Erbil until its lapse in the seventeenth century, and thereafter part of the diocese of Mosul.

== Yohannan Hormizd and the Chaldeans of Kirkuk ==
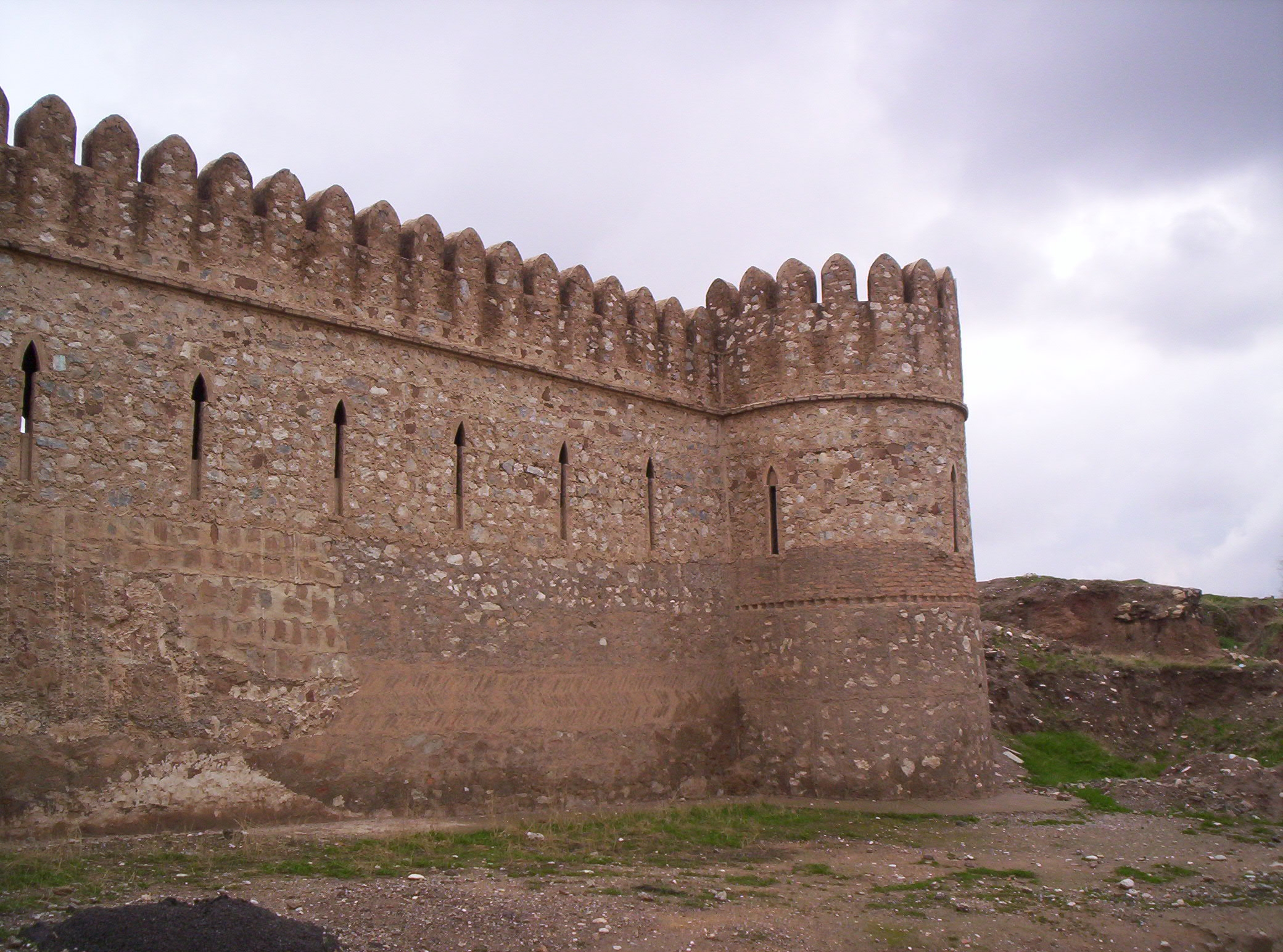
The citadel of Kirkuk

The Assyrian community of Kirkuk was still a Church of the East in sympathy in the first half of the eighteenth century. The Carmelite missionary Father Benedict visited Kirkuk on 20 May 1743, where he found 'a large number of Nestorians very ignorant of religion'. Speaking of the efforts of Catholic missionaries in the district, he said that 'there are many difficulties at Kirkuk, and few results'.

The foundation of the Chaldean Catholic diocese of Kirkuk has been attributed to Yohannan VIII Hormizd, who was recognised by the Vatican as patriarchal administrator of the patriarchate of Babylon in 1780 and, after five decades of disputes and confrontations, as patriarch in 1830. According to the Chaldean Catholic priest Joseph Tfinkdji, Yohannan Hormizd visited the town of Kirkuk in 1789 while travelling from Mosul to Baghdad, and converted its Church of the East community to Catholicism. He is said to have consecrated a Chaldean metropolitan for Kirkuk, Mar Abraham, who resided in ʿAïnqawa during his reign, and died between 1821 and 1824. The source for this assertion is not clear. Abraham is not mentioned by any other source, and as Yohannan Hormizd himself (then considered by the Vatican to be merely metropolitan of Mosul) is styled 'metropolitan of Kirkuk' in a colophon of 1798, the Kirkuk region would seem to have been part of the diocese of Mosul at this period.

Whether or not Yohannan Hormizd was able to consecrate a metropolitan for Kirkuk, the sympathies of the town's Assyrian Catholics were clearly of some significance during the power struggle between the patriarchal administrator and his opponents in the Chaldean Church and the Vatican. In 1795 the Vatican's representative Padre Fulgenzio appears to have tried to persuade the Chaldean Catholics of Kirkuk to withdraw their allegiance from Yohannan Hormizd. According to Yohannan Hormizd's own account, quoted by Badger:

Padre Fulgenzio, however, departed and went to Selook, which is Kerkook, and created divisions among the Meshihayé there, and he did the same at Ainkâwa. Moreover he wrote letters to other villages which began in this style: I, Padre Fulgenzio, superior of the Patriarchs of the East, &c.

== The Chaldean archbishops of Kirkuk ==
A stable Chaldean diocese for Kirkuk seems to have been founded by the patriarchal administrator Augustine Hindi, who consecrated Lawrent Shoʿa of Tel Isqof metropolitan of Kirkuk in 1826 in opposition to Yohannan Hormizd. Lawrent Shoʿa, born in Tel Isqof around 1792, was a monk in the monastery of Rabban Hormizd and was ordained a priest in 1821 (Tfinkdji). Several manuscripts copied by him have survived, whose colophons mention that his father's name was Nisan. Like most of his fellow monks, he supported Gabriel Dambo in his long struggle with Yohannan Hormizd. After his consecration he initially returned to Tel Isqof, but eventually moved to Kirkuk, where he administered his diocese for 27 years. He died in Mosul on 23 August 1853 and was buried in the cathedral of Mart Meskinta.

Lawrent Shoʿa was succeeded by Yohannan Tamraz, born in Telkepe around 1803. Like his predecessor, he was a monk of the monastery of Rabban Hormizd, and was ordained a priest in 1834. He was recommended for the diocese of Kirkuk by Lawrent Shoʿa shortly before his death, and was consecrated metropolitan of Kirkuk in Mosul on 14 September 1854 by the patriarch Joseph VI Audo. He was present with the patriarch at the First Vatican Council in 1870, and died at Kirkuk on 13 September 1881.

Yohannan Tamraz was succeeded in 1883 by Joseph Gabriel Adamo of Seert. He was born in 1851 and educated by the Propaganda. He copied two manuscripts as a deacon at Mosul in 1869, whose colophons mention that his father's name was Peter and his grandfather's ʿAbd al-Masih. He was ordained a priest on 21 April 1878, and was consecrated metropolitan of Kirkuk on 26 August 1883 in Mosul by the patriarch Eliya Abulyonan (d. 1894). He represented the Chaldean church at the Eighth International Eucharistic Conference, held in Jerusalem in 1893. In 1894 he was elected by a majority of the Chaldean bishops to succeed patriarch Eliya Abulyonan, but declined the honour. He died at the age of 49 on 4 June 1899.

Joseph Gabriel Adamo was succeeded by Eliya Joseph Khayyat, patriarchal vicar and titular archbishop of Nisibis since 1895 and apostolic vicar of the Chaldean patriarchate since the death of the patriarch ʿAbdishoʿ V Khayyat in 1899. He was transferred to the diocese of Kirkuk in 1900 by the new patriarch Joseph Emmanuel II Thomas, and died suddenly at Kirkuk three years later, on 2 February 1903.

Eliya Joseph Khayyat was succeeded by Theodore Msayeh, who was born in Baghdad around 1837, educated at the College of the Propaganda, and ordained a priest at Rome in 1870. He was nominated to the diocese of Kirkuk on 13 August 1904 and consecrated metropolitan of Kirkuk on 16 October 1904. He died on 26 May 1917.

Theodore Msayeh was succeeded by Stephen Jibri. He was consecrated metropolitan of Kirkuk in 1917. He died in 1952 after a reign of forty-five years.

The Metropolitans of Kirkuk during the second half of the twentieth century were Ephrem Guogue (1954–6), Rufa'il Rabban (1957–67), Gabriel Qoda (7 March 1968 – 1977) and Andrew Sana (1977-2002).

Louis Sako succeeded Andrew Sana as archbishop of Kirkuk on 24 October 2002. He was elected Chaldean-Catholic Patriarch of Babylon in February 2013.

=== Merger with Eparchy of Sulaimaniya ===
In July 2013, Sulaimaniya was united with the Kirkuk diocese. Yousif Mirkis was appointed as a successor to Sako in 2014, and is the incumbent.

==== History of Eparchy of Sulaimaniya ====
The Chaldean Catholic Eparchy of Sulaimaniya was a Chaldean Catholic (Eastern Catholic, Chaldean Rite) eparchy (diocese) in Iraqi Kurdistan. The eparchy was established on 7 March 1968. It never had a proper eparch (bishop), only apostolic administrators ('ad interim'). On 11 July 2013, it was suppressed, its title and territory being merged into the Metropolitan Chaldean Catholic Archeparchy of Kirkuk–Sulaimaniya.

Ordinaries (all apostolic administrators)

- Apostolic Administrator Emmanuel Haddad (1976 – 1982)
- Apostolic Administrator Abdul-Ahad Rabban, Hieronymites (O.S.H.) (1982 – 1998)
- Apostolic Administrator Abbot Yousif Ibrahim, Antonian Order of Saint Ormizda of the Chaldeans (O.A.O.C.) (1999 – 2006)
- Apostolic Administrator Archimandrite Denha Hanna Touma, O.A.O.C. (2006 – 2013.07.11)

== Ordinaries ==
- Laurent Choa (1826–1853)
- Jean Tamres (1854–1881)
- Joseph-Gabriel Adamo (1883–1899)
- Elie-Joseph Khayatt (1900–1903)
- Theodore Messaieh (1904–1917)
- Hormisdas Etienne Djibri (1917–1953)
- Ephrem Gogué (1954–1956)
- Raphael Rabban (1957–1967)
- Gabriel Koda (1968–1977)
- André Sana (1977–2002)
- Louis Sako (2002–2013)
- Yousif Thomas Mirkis (since 2014)

== Population statistics ==
The archdiocese of Kirkuk had a population of 218 Assyrian Chaldean families, with 9 priests and 8 churches, in 1850 (Badger); 7,000 Chaldeans, with 22 priests and 16 churches, in 1896 (Chabot); and 5,840 Chaldeans, with 19 priests and 9 churches and a small Assyrian Church of the East community, in 1913 (Tfinkdji).

Table 1: Chaldean communities in the archdiocese of Kirkuk, 1913
Name of village	Name in Syriac	Number of believers	Number of priests	Number of churches	Name of village	Name in Syriac	Number of believers	Number of priests	Number of churches
Kirkuk	ܟܪܟ ܕܒܝܬ ܣܠܘܟ	800	4	2	Armota	ܐܪܡܘܬܐ	100	1	1
Ankawa	ܥܲܢܟܵܒ̣ܵܐ	3,000	5	2	Suleimaniya	ܣܘܠܝܡܐܢܝܐ	200	1	1
Shaqlawa	ܫܵܩܠܵܒ݂ܐ	1,200	5	1	Erbil	ܐܲܪܒܹܝܠ	50	0	0
Koy Sanjaq	ܟܘܝܐ	200	2	1	Rawanduz	ܪܘܢܕܝܙ	90	0	0
Qorya		200	1	1	Total		5,840	19	9

The Kirkuk district was not greatly affected by the disorders of the First World War. In 1928, according to an official statistic prepared by the Sacred Congregation pro Ecclesia Orientali, it contained seven villages, 18 priests and 4,800 believers. This statistic, collected under difficult conditions, is probably on the low side. In 1937 the archdiocese of Kirkuk contained 7,620 Chaldeans, with 19 priests and 8 churches (Kajo). The significant rise in the Chaldean population of Kirkuk and Shaqlawa since 1913 seems to have been mainly due to the resettlement of Assyrian refugees in the district during the intervening years.

Table 2: Chaldean communities in the archdiocese of Kirkuk, 1937
Name of village	Name in Syriac	Number of believers	Number of priests	Number of churches	Name of village	Name in Syriac	Number of believers	Number of priests	Number of churches
Kirkuk	ܟܪܟ ܕܒܝܬ ܣܠܘܟ	1,570	4	2	Armota	ܐܪܡܘܬܐ	210	1	1
Ankawa	ܥܲܢܟܵܒ̣ܵܐ	3,220	5	1	Suleimaniya	ܣܘܠܝܡܐܢܝܐ	125	1	1
Shaqlawa	ܫܵܩܠܵܒ݂ܐ	1,890	6	1	Erbil	ܐܲܪܒܹܝܠ	75	0	0
Koy Sanjaq	ܟܘܝܐ	350	1	1	Total		7,620	18	8

== Sources ==
- Baaba, Youel A. (2009). The Assyrian Homeland before World War I. Alamo, California: Youel A Baaba Library. ISBN 978-0-9707489-6-6.
- Badger, George Percy (1852). The Nestorians and Their Rituals. Vol. 1. London: Joseph Masters.
- Badger, George Percy (1852). The Nestorians and Their Rituals. Vol. 2. London: Joseph Masters. ISBN 978-0-7905-4482-3.
- Baum, Wilhelm; Winkler, Dietmar W. (2003). The Church of the East: A Concise History. London-New York: Routledge-Curzon. ISBN 978-1-134-43019-2.
- Baumer, Christoph (2006). The Church of the East: An Illustrated History of Assyrian Christianity. London-New York: Tauris. ISBN 978-1-84511-115-1.
- Chabot, Jean-Baptiste (1896). "Éttat religieux des diocèses formant le patriarcat chaldéen de Babylone". Revue de l'Orient chrétien. 1: 433–453.
- Chick, H. G., A Chronicle of the Carmelites in Persia (2 vols, London, 1939)
- Fiey, J.M. (1962). Assyrie chrétienne (3 vols). Beirut.
- Fiey, Jean Maurice (1993). Pour un Oriens Christianus Novus: Répertoire des diocèses syriaques orientaux et occidentaux. Beirut: Orient-Institut. ISBN 978-3-515-05718-9.
- Giamil, Samuel (1902). Genuinae relationes inter Sedem Apostolicam et Assyriorum orientalium seu Chaldaeorum ecclesiam. Roma: Ermanno Loescher.
- Martin, Jean Pierre Paulin (1867). La Chaldée, esquisse historique, suivie de quelques réflexions sur l'Orient. Rome: Imprimerie de la Civiltà Cattolica.
- Tfinkdji, Joseph (1914). "L' église chaldéenne catholique autrefois et aujourd'hui". Annuaire Pontifical Catholique. 17: 449–525.
- Tisserant, Eugène (1931). "L'Église nestorienne". Dictionnaire de théologie catholique. Vol. 11. Paris: Letouzey et Ané. pp. 157–323.
- Wilmshurst, David (2000). The Ecclesiastical Organisation of the Church of the East, 1318–1913. Louvain: Peeters Publishers. ISBN 978-90-429-0876-5.
- Wilmshurst, David (2011). The Martyred Church: A History of the Church of the East. London: East & West Publishing Limited. ISBN 978-1-907318-04-7.
