= Chaldean Catholic Eparchy of Aleppo =

Eastern Catholic eparchy in Syria

Coordinates: 36.1833°N 37.1500°E

Eparchy of Aleppo (Chaldean) Eparchia Aleppensis Chaldaeorum
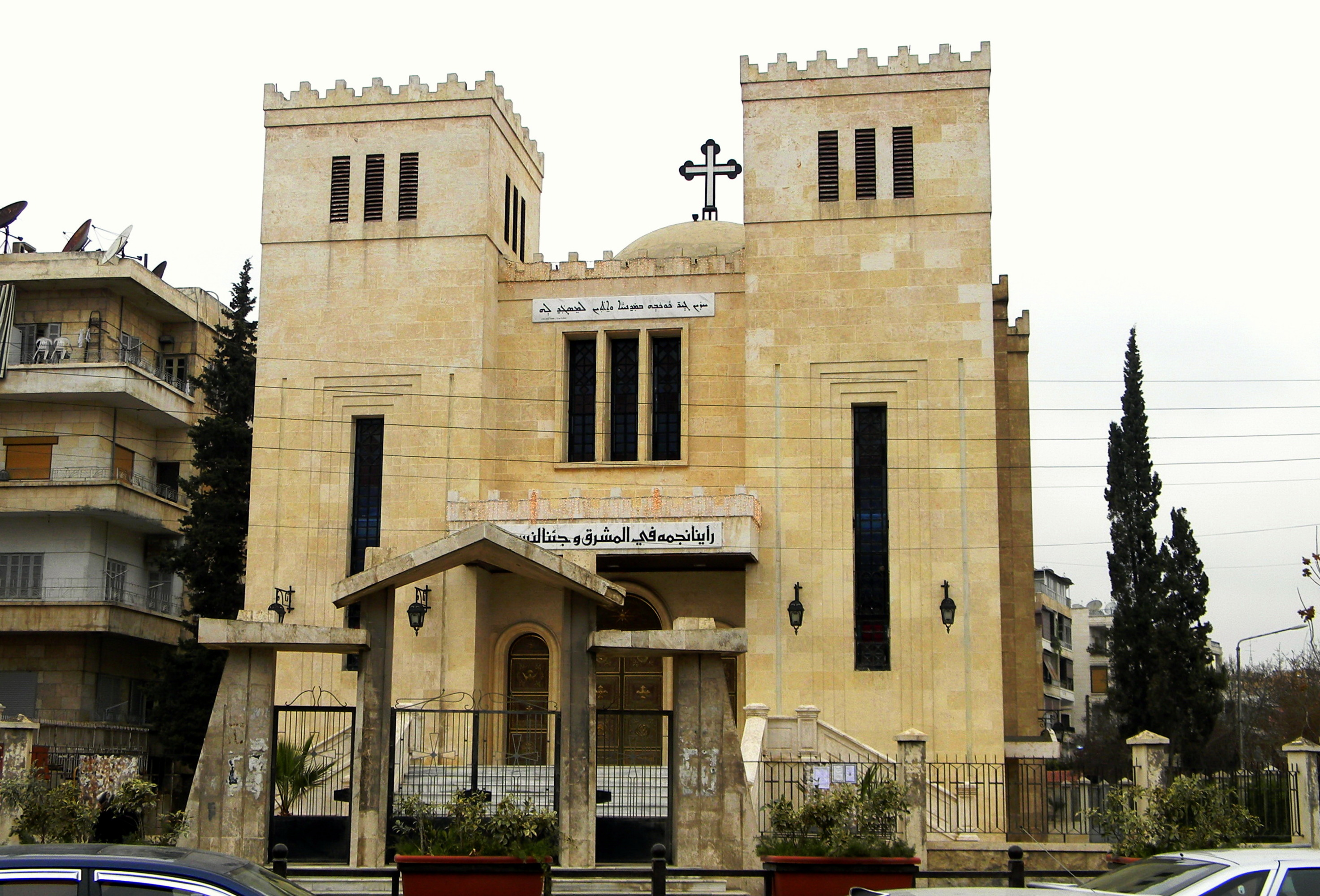

Location
- Country: Syria

Statistics
- Population: (as of 2012); 30,000
- Parishes: 14

Information
- Denomination: Chaldean Catholic Church
- Rite: East Syriac Rite
- Established: 1957

Current leadership
- Pope: Leo XIV
- Patriarch: Louis Raphael I Sako
- Eparch: Antoine Audo

The Chaldean Catholic Eparchy of Aleppo (also Halab in Arabic, or Beroa as in Antiquity) is an eparchy of the Chaldean Catholic Church covering the whole country of Syria.

== Territory and statistics ==
The eparchy extends its jurisdiction over the faithful of the Chaldean Catholic Church of Syria. It is directly subject to the Chaldean Catholic Patriarch of Babylon (actually in Baghdad, Iraq), not part of any ecclesiastical province.

Its cathedral episcopal see is the St. Joseph's Cathedral, in Aleppo, the largest city in Syria.

The territory is divided into 14 parishes.

== History ==
A colony of Chaldean Christians was certainly present in Aleppo in the early 16th century, most probably from the city of Diyarbakır in Upper Mesopotamia. In 1723 the Chaldean patriarch Joseph III obtained from the Ottoman government a firman who recognized his jurisdiction over the Chaldean faithful of the city. However, the number of the Chaldean faithful remained always reduced; at the beginning of the twentieth century the community included only 250 people. In 1901, however, Pope Leo XIII authorized the institution of a patriarchal vicariate, directly dependent on the patriarch.

The eparchy was erected on July 3, 1957, with the bull Almost pastor of Pope Pius XII, with which the pontiff suppressed the Chaldean Catholic Eparchy of Gazireh of the Chaldeans and established the new ecclesiastical circumscription.

== Episcopal ordinaries ==
(all Chaldean Rite)

Exempt Eparch (Bishop) of Syria

- (vacant ? unavailable ?)

Exempt Eparchs (Bishops) of Aleppo

- Apostolic Administrator Gabriel Naamo (1938.09.30 – 1957.06.27), Titular Bishop of Batnæ (1938.09.30 – 1957.06.28), also Apostolic Administrator of Gazireh of the Chaldeans (Turkey) (1938.09.30 – 1957.06.27); later Eparch (Bishop) of Beirut of the Chaldeans (Lebanon) (1957.06.28 – 1964.02.12)
- Bishop Paul Cheikho (1957.06.28 – 1958.12.13), previously Eparch of Aqrā of the Chaldeans (Iraq) (1947.02.22 – 1957.06.28); later Eparch of Mossul of the Chaldeans (Iraq) (1958.12.13 – 1960), then Patriarch of Babylon of the Chaldeans (Iraq) ([1958.12.13] 1959.03.12 – death 1989.04.13), President of Synod of the Chaldean Church (1969 – 1989.04.13) and President of Assembly of the Catholic Bishops of Iraq (1976 – 1989.04.13)
- Stéphane Bello (1959.10.23 – death 1989.11.26)
- Antoine Audo, S.J. (1992.01.18 – ...)

== Sources ==
- Fiey, Jean Maurice (1993). Pour un Oriens Christianus Novus: Répertoire des diocèses syriaques orientaux et occidentaux. Beirut: Orient-Institut. ISBN 9783515057189.
- C. Karalevsky, v. Alep, in Dictionnaire d'Histoire et de Géographie ecclésiastiques, vol. XII, Paris 1953, coll. 112–113, http://gallica.bnf.fr/ark:/12148/bpt6k6561037d/f74.image
