= Antonian Order of Saint Ormizda of the Chaldeans =

- Ordo Antonianus Santae Hormisdae Chaldaeorum
- Abbreviation: OAOC
- Formation: 1808; 218 years ago
- Headquarters: Baghdad, Iraq
- Members: 17 members (15 priests) (2018)
- Superior General: Samer Soreshow Yohanna, OAOC
- Parent organization: Chaldean Catholic Church

The Antonian Order of Saint Ormizda of the Chaldeans (Latin: Ordo Antonianus S. Hormisdæ Chaldæorum; abbreviated OAOC) is a Chaldean Catholic monastic order of pontifical right for men.

The monastic order was founded in 1808. Its headquarters is in Saint-Antony convent, Baghdad, Al-Duorah province, Iraq.

In 2018, it had 6 houses with 17 members including 15 priests.

== Superiors general ==
- Archimandrite Denha Hanna Touma, O.A.O.C. (? – 2013.07.11)
- Fr. Waheed K. Gabriele Tooma, O.A.O.C. (2013 – 2014)
- Fr. Joseph Abdel Sater, O.A.O.C. (2014 – 2016)
- Fr. Samer Soreshow Yohanna, O.A.O.C. ( 2016–present)

== Prelates from their ranks ==
Deceased, with year of death

- 1915 : Philip Yaʿqob Abrahamo, Bishop of Gazireh of the Chaldeans (Turkish Kurdistan)
- 2006 : Abbot Yousif Ibrahim, Apostolic Administrator emeritus of Sulaimaniya of the Chaldeans (Iraq)
- 2013: Archimandrite Denha Hanna Touma, Apostolic Administrator emeritus of Sulaimaniya of the Chaldeans (Iraq)
