= Sultana Mahdokht =

Daughter of Pholar, the Prince of Dorsas

Sultana Mahdokht (died January 12, 319) was the daughter of Pholar, the Prince of Dorsas.

Together with her brothers Adorfrowa and Mehrnarsa, Mahdokht is a canonized saint in the Church of the East and churches that split from it due to her and her brothers' execution on January 12, 319 A.D. for leaving the Zoroastrian faith at a time when apostasy was punished by death under Shapur II. Their feast is celebrated on January 12. They are also commemorated in the Syriac Orthodox Church. She is also the patron saint of the village of Araden, which is located in northern Iraq. The Sultana Mahdokht Church dating from the 4th century in Araden commemorates her by bearing her name (which comes from Persian māh 'moon' and dokht 'daughter'). It is a pilgrimage site for many Syriac Christians.
