= André Sana =

- Archbishop emeritus of Chaldean Catholic Archdiocese of Kirkuk (Chaldean Archdiocese)
- Church: Chaldean Catholic Church
- See: Chaldean Catholic Diocese of Kirkuk (Chaldean Rite)
- In office: 1957-2003
- Predecessor: Gabriel Koda
- Successor: Louis Sako
- Previous post: Archeparch

Orders
- Ordination: 15 May 1945
- Consecration: 6 October 1957 by Yousef VII Ghanima

Personal details
- Born: 20 December 1920 Araden, Mandatory Iraq
- Died: 8 May 2013 (aged 92)

André Sana (20 December 1920 – 8 May 2013) was an Iraqi hierarch of the Chaldean Catholic Church.

== Biography ==
Born in Araden, Iraq, he was ordained a priest on 15 May 1945. He was elected Bishop of the Catholic Diocese of Aqra (Chaldean Rite) on 20 June 1957, and was consecrated bishop on 6 October 1957. He was elected bishop of the Catholic Diocese of Kirkuk (Chaldean Rite) on 14 December 1977 until his retirement on 27 September 2003.
