= Shaqlawa =

Shaqlawa شەقڵاوە Şeqlawe
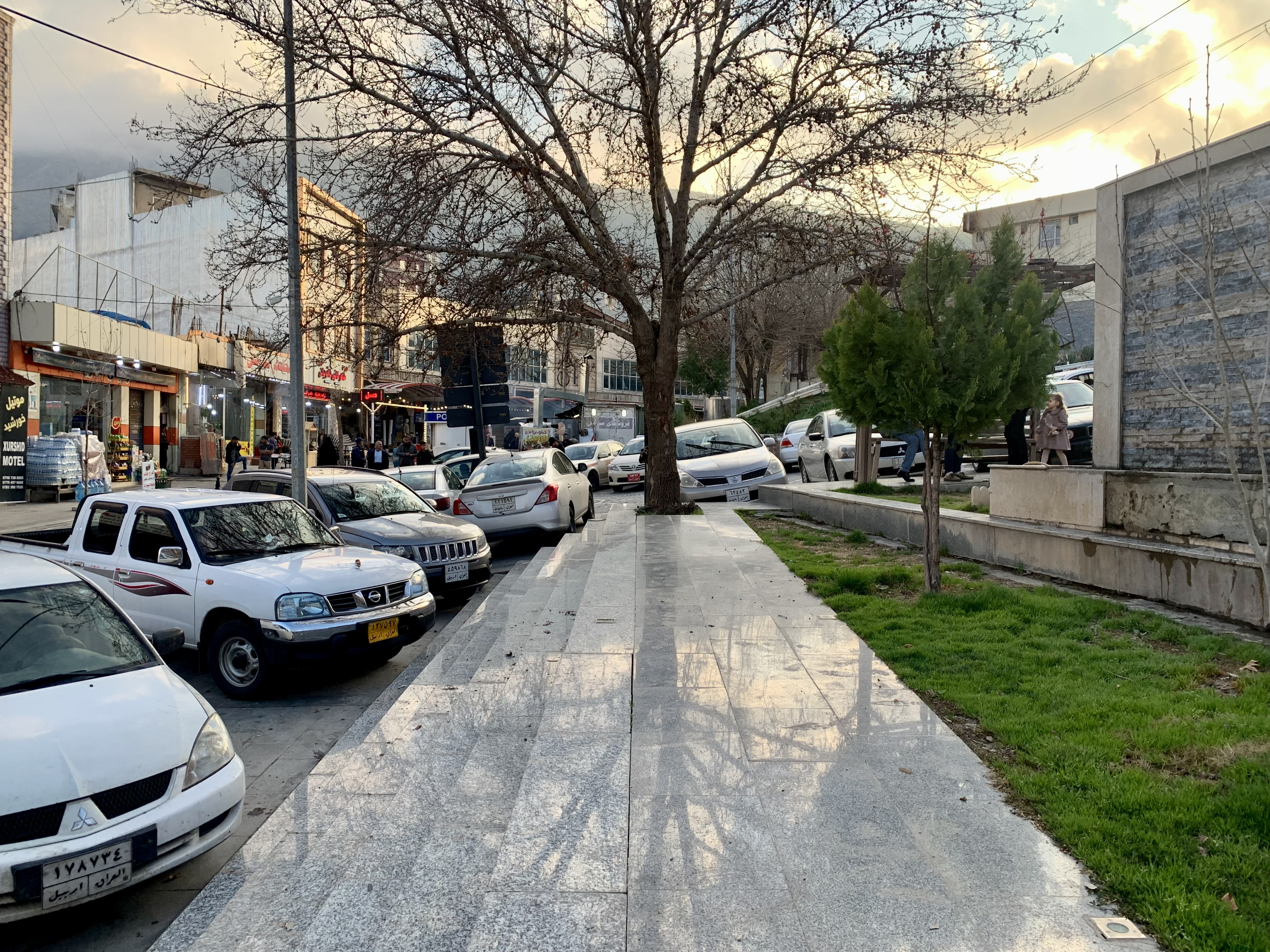
- View from Downtown, 2023

- Shaqlawa in Iraq
- Coordinates: 36°24′20″N 44°19′15″E
- Country: Iraq
- Autonomous region: Kurdistan Region
- Province: Erbil Governorate
- Elevation: 966 m (3,169 ft)

Population (2018)
  - Total: 25,500

Shaqlawa (Kurdish: شەقڵاوە, romanized: Şeqlawe, Arabic: شقلاوة, Syriac: ܫܵܩܠܵܒ݂ܐ, romanized: Shaqlāwa) is a historic city and a hill station in the Erbil Governorate in the Kurdistan Region of Iraq. Shaqlawa, a city of approximately 25,500 people, lies 51 km to the northeast of Erbil, at the bottom of Safeen mountain. Shaqlawa is situated between Safeen mountain and Sork mountain, and sits 1066 m above sea level.

The city is known for its waterfalls, trees, and greenery. It is also known for its honey.

== Climate ==
Shaqlawa has a Mediterranean climate (Csa) with very hot summers and relatively cold, wet winters. Subfreezing highs are very common in the winter, which would present frost. Snowfall is not uncommon.

Climate data for Shaqlawa
Month	Jan	Feb	Mar	Apr	May	Jun	Jul	Aug	Sep	Oct	Nov	Dec	Year
Mean daily maximum °C (°F)	9.1 (48.4)	10.4 (50.7)	14.5 (58.1)	20.1 (68.2)	27.5 (81.5)	34.4 (93.9)	38.6 (101.5)	38.8 (101.8)	35.0 (95.0)	27.9 (82.2)	17.8 (64.0)	10.8 (51.4)	23.7 (74.7)
Mean daily minimum °C (°F)	−0.4 (31.3)	0.4 (32.7)	4.1 (39.4)	8.8 (47.8)	14.4 (57.9)	19.7 (67.5)	23.6 (74.5)	23.3 (73.9)	18.9 (66.0)	13.1 (55.6)	6.6 (43.9)	1.4 (34.5)	11.2 (52.1)
Average precipitation mm (inches)	149 (5.9)	202 (8.0)	165 (6.5)	111 (4.4)	43 (1.7)	0 (0)	0 (0)	0 (0)	1 (0.0)	10 (0.4)	76 (3.0)	124 (4.9)	881 (34.8)
