= Kurdistan Music Archive =

Museums in Erbil

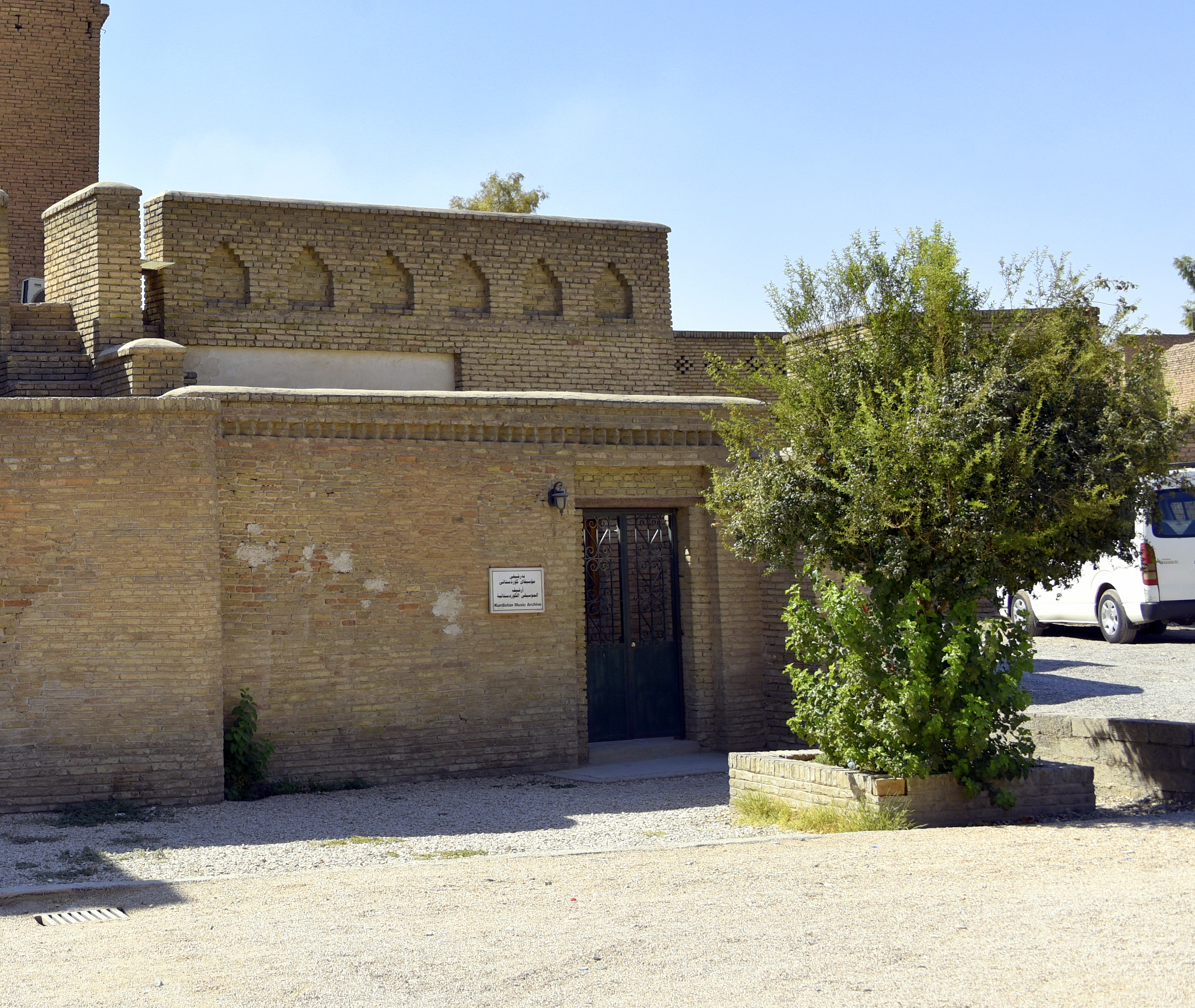
The Kurdistan Music Archive within the Citadel of Erbil, Hawler, Iraq

The Kurdistan Music Archive is a one-room exhibition-like archive that occupies one of the renovated traditional buildings at the Citadel of Erbil. The current director (and owner) is Amjad Assad. Assad, almost working alone with no external help, has been digitizing, for several years, thousands of cassette tapes and 78 rpm phonographs of Kurdish music and songs spanning about 100 years. Originally, the archive was established in 1952 by his grandfather at the old bazaar of Hawler's downtown. The entire archive was relocated to its current location at the citadel in 2017. The objective behind creating this archive is to preserve the Kurdish heritage of songs and its folklore.

== See also ==
- Erbil Stones and Gems Museum
- Turkmen Heritage House
- Iraqi Kurds
