= Turkmen Culture House =

Museum in Erbil, Kurdistan, Iraq

Coordinates: 36°11′25″N 44°00′32″E

- بيت التراث التركماني
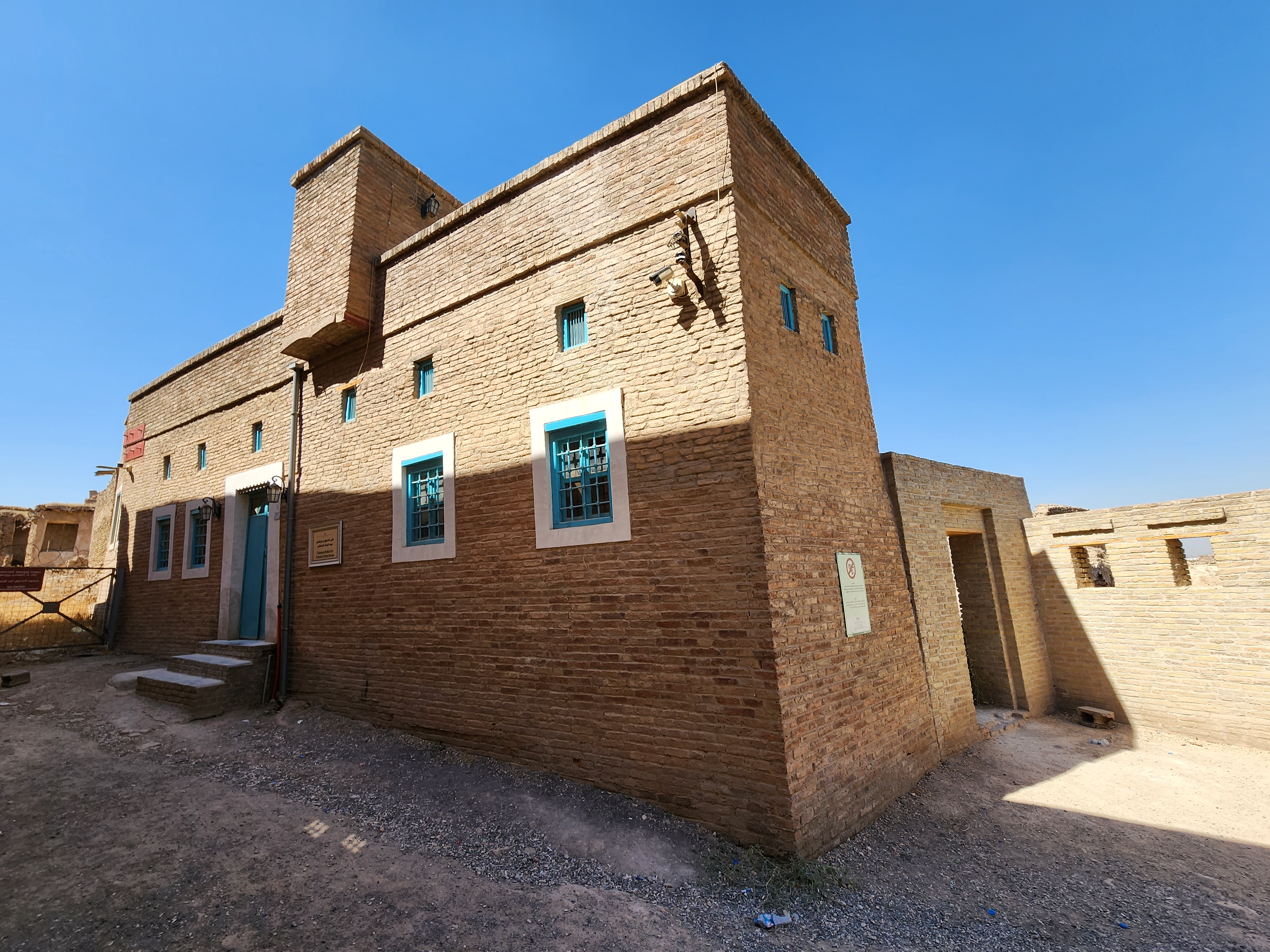
- The Turkmen Culture House in Erbil Citadel
- Established: 5 September 2021; 5 years ago
- Location: Erbil Citadel, Erbil, Kurdistan Region, Iraq
- Type: Cultural/Heritage Museum
- Collections: Iraqi Turkmen cultural and historical artifacts

The Turkmen Culture House (Turkish: Türkmen Kültür Evi; Arabic: بيت التراث التركماني) is an exhibition located within the Citadel of Erbil, in the center of Erbil, Kurdistan Region. It was officially inaugurated on September 5, 2021.

The exhibition aims to preserve and display the culture and history of the Iraqi Turkmen, who are the third largest nationality of Iraq. It occupies one of the renovated traditional buildings on the west wing of the citadel. The exhibition displays a typical model of the interior as well as the traditional and cultural components of Iraqi Turkmen in order to preserve their cultural heritage.

== See also ==
- Erbil Stones and Gems Museum
