= Taq Taq =

Taq Taq (Persian: طاق طاق or تق تق) may refer to:

- Taq Taq, Fars (طاق طاق - Ţāq Ţāq)
- Taq Taq, Kermanshah (تق تق -Taq Taq)
- Taqtaq District, a district in Erbil Governorate
- Taqtaq, Iraq, a town in Kurdistan Region, Iraq
