= Ömer Aras =

Turkish banker (born 1954)

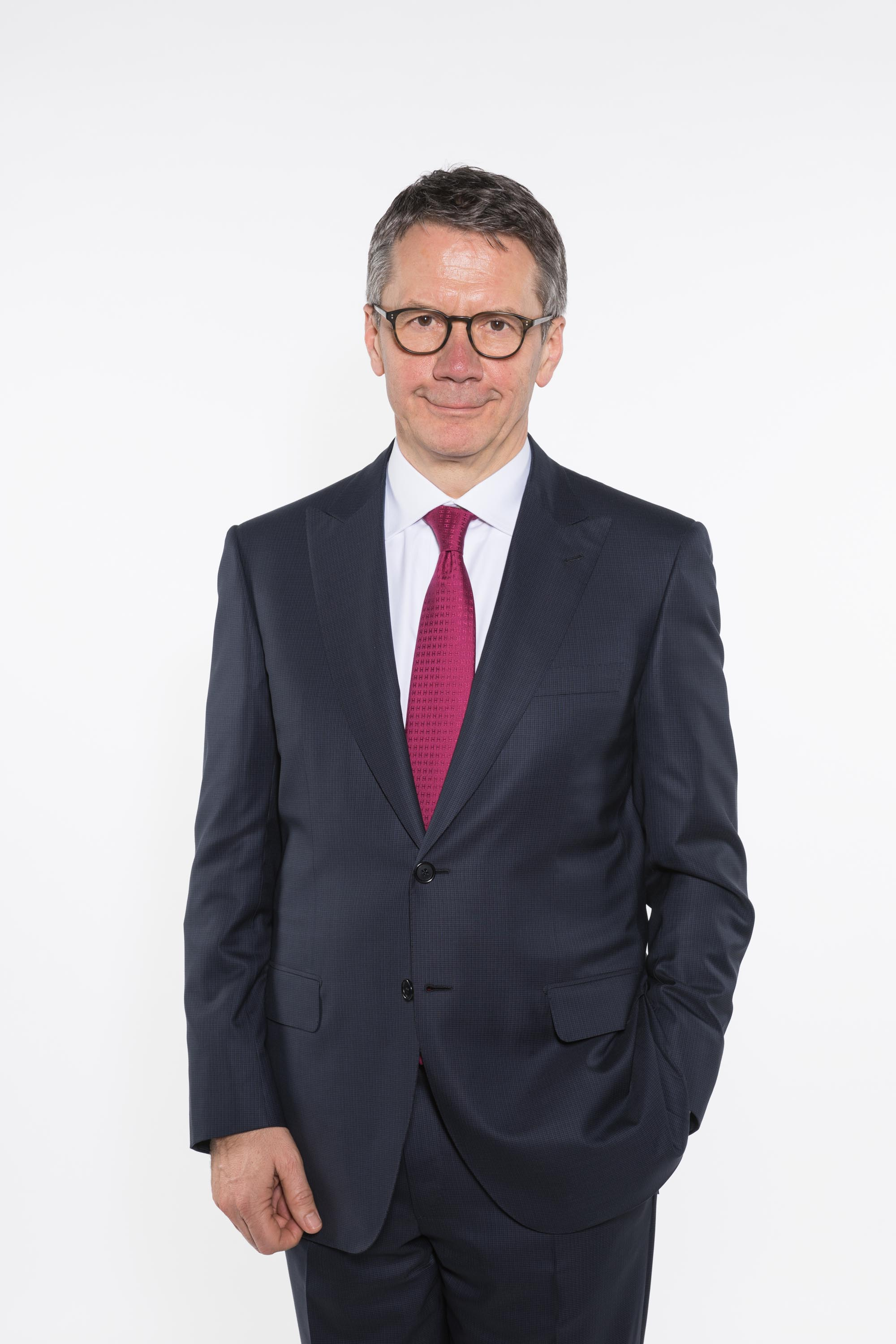
- Born: 8 November 1954; Istanbul, Turkey
- Education: Syracuse University (PhD)
- Occupation: Banker
- Organization: Borusan
- Partner: Feyza Aras
- Parent(s): Sütude Aras, Ferzan Aras

Mehmet Ömer Arif Aras (born November 8, 1954) is a Turkish banker and business executive. He served as chairman of QNB Türkiye, formerly known as Finansbank and QNB Finansbank, from 2010 until 2026. He is a member of the board of directors of Borusan Holding and President of the High Advisory Council of the Turkish Industry and Business Association (TÜSİAD).

== Early life ==
Ömer Aras was born on November 8, 1954, in Istanbul. He completed his primary, secondary and high school education at Şişli Terakki High School in 1971. He graduated from the Academy of Economic and Commercial Sciences, College of Economics and Finance in 1975, and received an MBA in 1978 and PhD in Business Administration from Syracuse University in New York, U.S. He worked as an assistant professor at the Ohio State University Business Administration Department from 1982 to 1984 and returned to Turkey in 1984.

He married Feyza Aras in 1980 and has two children and have two sons and four grandchildren.

== Career ==
He started his career as a junior credit marketing manager at Citibank Istanbul in 1984. In 1987, when he was working as a credit marketing manager and credit committee member, he quit his job to work for Yapı Kredi as head of Securities.

He co-founded Finansbank with Hüsnü Özyeğin in 1987. He worked as assistant general manager responsible for credit marketing, treasury and foreign affairs from 1987 to 1989 and became general manager in 1989. He served as general manager from 1989 to 1995 and as an executive board member at QNB Finansbank.

Aras worked as the vice chairman of the board at Fiba Holding from 1995 to 2006, and was a member of the board of directors at Finansbank's affiliates in Switzerland, the Netherlands, Russia, Romania and France. He also served as the chairman of the board at Marks & Spencer Turkey and as a member of the board at Gima, which are Fiba Holding's retail industry investments.

After the National Bank of Greece acquired Finansbank A.Ş from Fiba Group in 2006, he first worked as vice chairman and then chairman of the board in 2010. He also served as group CEO responsible for management of QNB Finansbank and its affiliates. In 2007, he acted as chairman of the board at Cigna Finans Retirement, formerly known as Finans Emeklilik, 51% of which was purchased by American Cigna in 2012.

He was elected to serve as the executive committee member responsible for affiliates in Southeastern Europe at the National Bank of Greece in 2008. He assumed management of banks operating in Bulgaria, Romania, Serbia, North Macedonia and Albania.

He worked as a member of the board at the Turkish Industry and Business Association from 2003 to 2006. In 2015, he was elected as vice president of its High Advisory Council.

He participated in the founding of Özyeğin University in 2007 and has been a member of the board of trustees since then.

In 2016, Finansbak A.Ş was acquired by Qatar National Bank (QNB) and the bank's name changed to QNB Finansbank. Aras continued to serve as chairman until March 2026, when he stepped down after 39 years with the bank.

In March 2026, Aras joined the board of directors of Borusan Holding, where he continues to serve.

== Affiliations ==
- TÜSİAD – vice president of the High Advisory Council
- Darüşşafaka Society – High Advisory Board
- Özyeğin University – board of trustees
- Hüsnü Özyeğin Foundation – board of trustees
- Mother Child Education Foundation – board of trustees
- Galata Business Angels
- Tennis, Fencing and Mountain Climbing Sports Club
- Galatasaray Sports Club

== Publications ==
- Turkish Policy Quarterly, September 2014
- International Journal of Policy and Information, December 15, 1985
- IIE Transactions, Volume 17, Number 3, September 1985
- TIMS XXVI Copenhagen, Denmark, June 17, 1984
- American Institute of Decision Sciences, San Francisco, November 22, 1982
- Journal of Operations Management, May 1982
- American Institute for Decision Sciences, Boston, November 18, 1981
- American Institute of Decision Sciences, Las Vegas, November 5, 1980
