= Aras (name) =

Aras is a masculine Lithuanian given name and surname. Rooted in old Lithuanian origins, the name Aras is associated with meanings such as "someone who takes responsibility" or "one who protects and cares deeply for what they value". It is often linked to qualities such as loyalty, strength, protectiveness, and a strong sense of ownership and dedication.

The name also shares its origin with the Aras River, a historically significant waterway that flows from the Eastern Anatolia region of Turkey through the Caucasus and into the Caspian Sea. The river has long been regarded as a symbol of life, continuity, and cultural connection across civilizations.

== Etymology and wider use ==
- Turkish: Derived from an old Turkic root related to “seeking” or “guarding,” the name conveys a sense of stewardship and responsibility.
- Kurdish & Persian: In these languages, Aras can mean “equal” or “balanced,” and it is also used in reference to the trans-boundary river.
- Lithuanian: A separate etymology treats Aras as a poetic word for “eagle.”

== Notable people ==
=== Given name ===
- Aras Agalarov (born 1955), Azerbaijani-Russian businessman
- Aras Amiri, Iranian national
- Aras Aydın (born 1989), Turkish actor
- Aras Baskauskas (born 1981), American yogi, musician and reality-TV personality
- Aras Habib, Iraqi military officer
- Aras Bulut İynemli (born 1990), Turkish actor
- Aras Kaya (born 1994), Kenyan-Turkish athlete
- Aras Koyi (born 1972), Kurdish-Swedish musical artist
- Aras Onur (born 1982), Turkish author
- Aras Özbiliz (born 1990), Turkish-Armenian footballer

=== Surname ===
- Ahmet Aras (born 1987), Turkish footballer
- Ardan Aras (born 1984), Indonesian politician and former footballer
- Augusto Aras (born 1958), Brazilian attorney
- Irsyad Aras (born 1979), Indonesian footballer
- Mehmet Ömer Arif Aras (born 1954), Turkish banker
- Muhammad Ben Aras (born 1930), Pakistani athlete
- Muhterem Aras (born 1966), German politician of Turkish origin
- Murat Aras (born 1973), Turkish screenwriter
- Tevfik Rüştü Aras (1883–1972), Turkish politician
- Yıldız Aras (born 1977), Turkish karateka
