= Fiba =

Fiba or FIBA may refer to:

- FIBA, or the International Basketball Federation
- Federación Internacional de Béisbol Amateur, name of the International Baseball Federation from 1944 to 1975
- FIBA Group, an international banking group
  - Finansbank, a Turkish bank formerly in FIBA Group
  - Fibabanka, a Turkish bank in FIBA Group
