= Taqtaq, Iraq =

Town in Erbil Governorate, Kurdistan Region, Iraq

Taqtaq تەقتەق
- Town
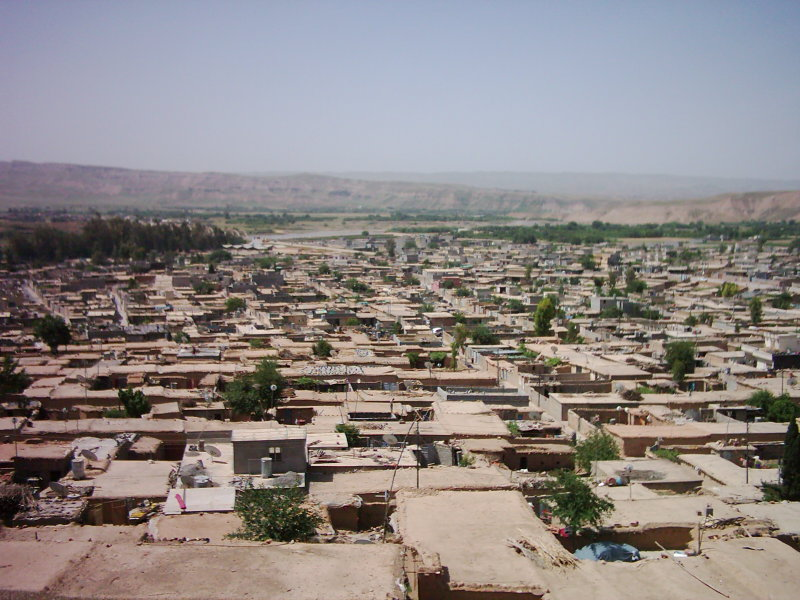
- Image of the town
- Interactive map of Taqtaq
- Location within Iraq and the Kurdistan Region Taqtaq (Iraqi Kurdistan)
- Coordinates: 35.88886°N 44.58557°E
- Country: Iraq
- Region: Kurdistan Region
- Governorate: Erbil Governorate
- District: Taqtaq District
- Subdistrict: Taqtaq Central Subdistrict

Government
  - Mayor: Aso Mustafa Abdullah

Population (2026)
  - Total: 24,276
- Time zone: UTC+3 (AST)

Taqtaq (Kurdish: تەقتەق, romanized: Teqteq), also spelled Taq Taq and formerly known as Azzizya, is a town in the Erbil Governorate of Kurdistan Region, Iraq. The town was originally in Koy Sinjaq District, but in 2024, Taqtaq District was created, and the town became the seat of the district. The town is approximately 61 kilometres (38 mi) south of Erbil. It lies on the right bank of the Little Zab River, separating it from the disputed Shwan Subdistrict. Taqtaq has a strategic location at the meeting point between three governorates: Kirkuk, Erbil and Sulaymaniyah. In 1960, the Ba’athist regime renamed the town Azzizya, and forced out the Kurds living there. After the 1991 uprising, the Kurdistan Regional Government gave the town its original name back.

== Etymology ==
There are two theories about the origin of the name "Taqtaq":

The first theory, held by the town's residents, is that the name comes from tak tak, which means "one by one" in Kurdish, referring to families who came one after another and settled in the area.

The second theory, supported by writers Jamal Baban and Aras Ilinjaghi, is that Taqtaq is a natural name related to the soil of the area, which is hard and rocky.

== History ==
=== Early history ===
Taqtaq's history as a settlement dates back to the 17th century (1600 AD). The town developed through three distinct stages: first from the village of Kuchik Nakhshina, then the village of Kalakchin, and finally at its current location.

In the second half of the 19th century (1850–1900), Taqtaq hosted a rije (an Ottoman tax collection office), a gendarmerie station, and a zaptieh (military police) post. The town historically served as a transit point for goods from Pshdar, Bitwen, and Koya being transported to Kirkuk and Baghdad via the Little Zab.

=== Under the Ba’athist Regime ===
In 1960, Ba’athist Iraq renamed the town "Azzizya", forced Kurds out of the town, and capped the oil wells to prevent Kurds profiting from the oil wealth.

On October 2, 1986, by a political decision of Erbil Governorate, which was controlled by the Ba’athist regime at the time, the town of Taqtaq, formerly called Azzizya, was reduced to a village. It remained administratively as a village until the 1991 uprisings.

=== Renaming to Taqtaq ===
After the uprisings and the establishment of the Kurdistan Regional Government, Taqtaq remained a village until a decision by the KRG, which occurred on June 20, 1995, restored its subdistrict status. Kakhan Nasreddin Amin became the first subdistrict governor of Taqtaq, and the KRG also gave back its original name, Taqtaq.

=== Elevation to district ===
After decades of the town being the seat of a subdistrict, Taqtaq District was created in 2024. The newly established district maintains the same areas of the subdistrict. The town became the seat of the district.

== Infrastructure ==
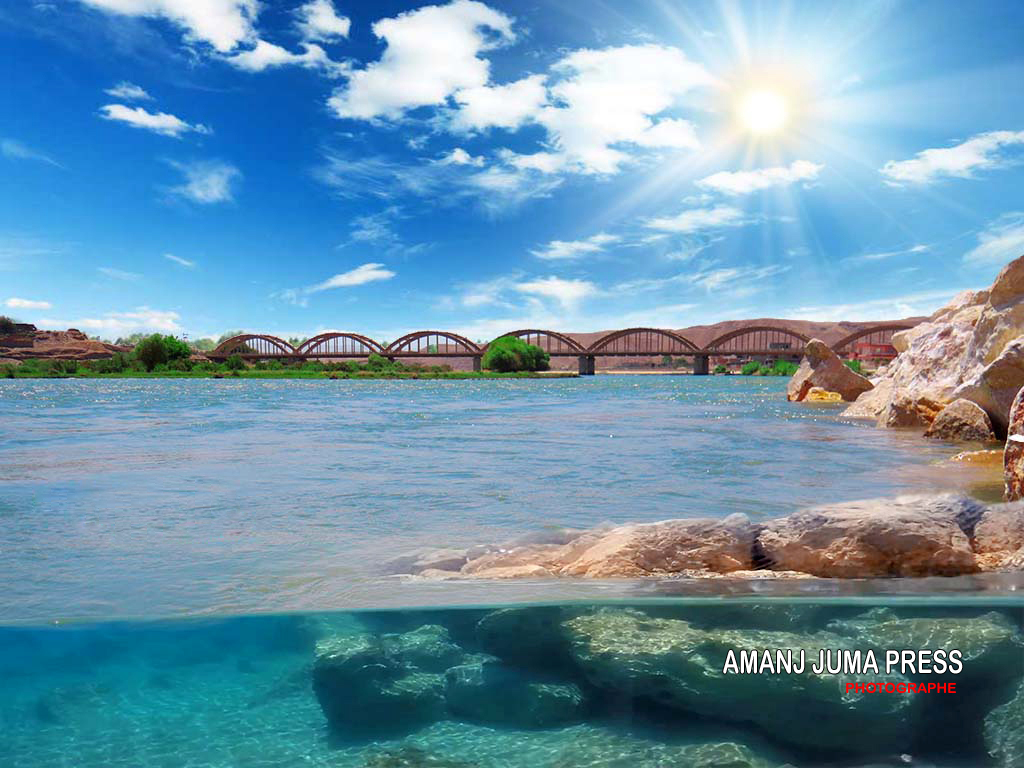
Image of the Taqtaq Bridge

=== Taqtaq Bridge ===
The town’s historic bridge is a central landmark and a source of local pride. The bridge was built in 1954 by a German company and is often described by locals as being the “spinal cord” of the town. Eight hundred workers worked 24 hours a day for three years to build the bridge, and three workers even died during its construction. The bridge is also of strategic importance, as it connects Erbil Governorate to Kirkuk Governorate. Both Ba’athist Iraq and Iran attempted to destroy the bridge many times due to its strategic value, but failed to do so.

== See also ==
- Taqtaq District
- Erbil Governorate
- Kurdistan Region
- Little Zab River
