= Murat Özyeğin =

Turkish businessman (born 1976)

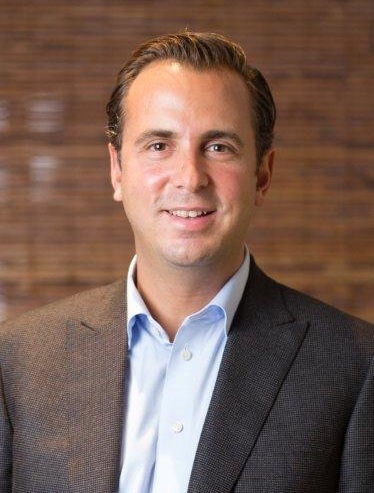
- Born: January 10, 1976 (age 50); Istanbul, Turkey
- Education: Carnegie Mellon University; Harvard Business School
- Organization: Fiba Holding
- Spouse: Yasemin Özyeğin
- Children: Lal Özyeğin; Ege Özyeğin; Yaz Özyeğin; Ela Ayşen Özyeğin
- Parent(s): Hüsnü Özyeğin; Ayşen Özyeğin

Murat Özyeğin (born January 10, 1976) is a Turkish businessman. He is a second-generation member of one of the wealthiest families of Turkey, and son of a self-made billionaire Hüsnü Özyeğin. He is a member of the executive board of Fiba Holding and a member of the board of trustees of Özyeğin University.

== Biography ==
Özyeğin was born on January 10, 1976, in Istanbul. He received his BS in Industry Management and Economics (double major) from Carnegie Mellon University in 1998 and MBA from Harvard Business School in 2003. He began his career as a financial analyst within the Mergers & Acquisitions Group at Bear Stearns in New York City. He moved to their London office in 2000 as a senior analyst.

He established the Strategy and Business Development Departments of Finansbank and Fiba Holding after his return to Turkey in 2003.

He was elected as the chairman of the board of Endeavor Turkey for two consecutive terms. He is the chairman of the Fiba Holding, an executive board member of Hüsnü M. Özyeğin Foundation, TÜSİAD, member of the board of trustees of Özyeğin University and WWF, member of Global Relations Forum and member of Global Advisory Council of Harvard University. On January 1, 2017, he was appointed as the honorary council of Singapore to Istanbul and to İzmir. He has been elected as the new chair of the Türkiye-US Business Council on January 20, 2024. He is a member of the steering committee of the Bilderberg Meeting as of June 2025.

Murat Özyeğin has three daughters and a son.
