= Fibabanka =

Turkish private sector bank

Fibabanka A.Ş.
- Type: Public (ISE: FIBA)
- Industry: Financial services
- Predecessor: Millennium Bank A.Ş.
- Founded: 2010; 16 years ago
- Headquarters: Beşiktaş, Istanbul, Turkey
- Area served: Turkey
- Key people: Hüsnü Özyeğin (Chairman); Ömer Mert (CEO)
- Products: Banking; Investment banking Investment management
- Parent: Credit Europa
- Website: fibabanka.com.tr

Fibabanka is a Turkish financial bank specializing in corporate, commercial, SME and enterprise, retail, agricultural, and private banking. The bank's subsidiaries, Fiba Portföy Yönetimi A.Ş. and Finberg, allow it to diversify its products and services for customers. In addition to traditional banking services, Fibabanka provides consumer loans, vehicle loans, housing loans, and commercial loans.

== History ==
The bank's history dates back to Sitebank A.Ş. The bank was transferred to SDIF, with its shares thereafter being sold to Novabank in 2002. The name of the bank was changed to Bank Europe Bankası A.Ş. in 2003. In 2006, shares owned by Novabank S.A. were transferred to Millennium BCP, and the bank's name was changed to Millennium Bank A.Ş. After necessary permissions were obtained upon Fiba Group's application to the Banking Regulation and Supervision Agency, Millennium Bank A.Ş. joined Fiba Group on December 27, 2010. At the time, the name of the bank was changed to Fibabanka A.Ş.

Fibabanka has steadily diversified its products and services to share transfer from Millennium Bank A.Ş. to Credit Europe Bank N.V., one of Fiba Group's major investments based in the Netherlands.

In 2012, the shares of the bank held by Credit Europe Bank N.V. were purchased by Fiba Holding A.Ş. In 2015, International Finance Corporation (IFC) and European Bank for Reconstruction and Development (EBRD), two global development institutions invested in the bank, each acquiring a 9.95% stake through a capital increase. In 2016, TurkFinance B.V. (Abraaj), a private equity investor, acquired a 9.95% stake in the bank.

As the sale of shares to Abraaj was consummated via an issuance of new shares, the shares of IFC and EBRD in the bank were reduced to 8.96% each. Following these investments, the bank's capital increased to TL 941,160,553.25. Fiba Group continues to retain the majority stake in Fibabanka, with 71.57% of the bank's share capital as of year-end 2018.
