= Fiba Group =

Turkish holding company

Fiba Holding Anonim Sirketi
- Type: Private
- Industry: Conglomerate
- Founded: 1987; 39 years ago
- Founder: Hüsnü Özyeğin
- Headquarters: Istanbul, Turkey
- Key people: Murat Özyeğin (Chairperson)
- Revenue: €18.7 billion (2022)
- Net income: €173 million (2022)
- Owner: Hüsnü Özyeğin
- Number of employees: 12,000 (2022)
- Website: fibagroup.com

Fiba Group (also known as Fiba Holding) is a Turkish holding company and conglomerate founded in 1987 by Hüsnü Özyeğin. Headquartered in Istanbul, the group operates in both financial and non-financial sectors, with significant activities in banking, leasing, insurance, asset management, retail, real estate, energy, tourism, and property management across Turkey, Europe and Asia. It employs approximately 13,000 people.

The group includes companies such as Fibabanka, Nexent Bank, Fiba Retail and Fina Enerji. It is chaired by Murat Özyeğin, the son of the founder. In 2017, Fiba Group became a co-owner of the Kınık coal mine and is listed on the Global Coal Exit List compiled by the NGO Urgewald.

Fiba Group's business interests span sectors including solar power, fashion retail (through franchises like Marks & Spencer, GAP, Forever 21 and Lululemon), and hospitality through its ownership of the Swissôtel The Bosphorus in Istanbul.

== History ==
Fiba Group was founded in 1987 by Hüsnü Özyeğin with the establishment of Finansbank in Turkey. In 1990, the group began expanding internationally, starting with banking operations in Switzerland. Over the next several years, it launched banking subsidiaries in Romania, Russia and the Netherlands. In 2006, Fiba Group sold its Turkish banking arm, Finansbank, to the National Bank of Greece, while retaining and rebranding its foreign operations under the name Credit Europe Bank. To re-establish a presence in the Turkish financial market, Fiba Group founded Fibabanka in 2010. The group entered the asset management sector in 2013 with the creation of Fiba Portföy.

In 2024, the group's retail division obtained the Turkish franchise rights for Forever 21 and Lululemon. In 2025, Fiba Retail acquired a 50% stake in Sportive through a joint venture with İş Private Equity.

== Operations ==
=== Financial Services ===
- Banking: Fibabanka which operates in Turkey and Nexent Bank, with operations in the Netherlands, Germany, Switzerland, Romania, Malta and Ukraine.
- Leasing: Credit Europe Leasing in Romania, Russia, and Ukraine.
- Factoring: Fiba Faktoring A.Ş., established in 1992.
- Insurance and Pension: Operates HDI Fiba Emeklilik ve Hayat and Fiba Sigorta.
- Asset Management: Fiba Portföy Yönetimi and Gelecek Varlık Yönetimi.

=== Non-financial Investments ===
- Retail: Fiba Retail holds franchise rights for Marks & Spencer, GAP, Banana Republic, Forever 21 and Lululemon in Turkey, Russia and Ukraine. It owns a 50% stake in Sportive.
- Real Estate: Fiba Commercial Properties manages shopping centers in Turkey, Romania, Moldova and China.
- Energy: Through Fina Enerji, the group is active in wind and solar energy and operates coal assets including the Kınık coal mine.
- Hospitality: Owns the luxury hotel Swissôtel The Bosphorus (an Accor brand) in Istanbul.

== Leadership ==
Fiba Group was founded by Hüsnü Özyeğin. Since 2019, the group has been chaired by his son, Murat Özyeğin, a prominent Turkish entrepreneur and philanthropist.

== Social Responsibility ==
Fiba Group supports education and social development through the Hüsnü M. Özyeğin Foundation and is a long-time partner of AÇEV (the Mother Child Education Foundation). In 2008, Hüsnü Özyeğin established Özyeğin University, a nonprofit private university in Istanbul.
