= Barış Tan =

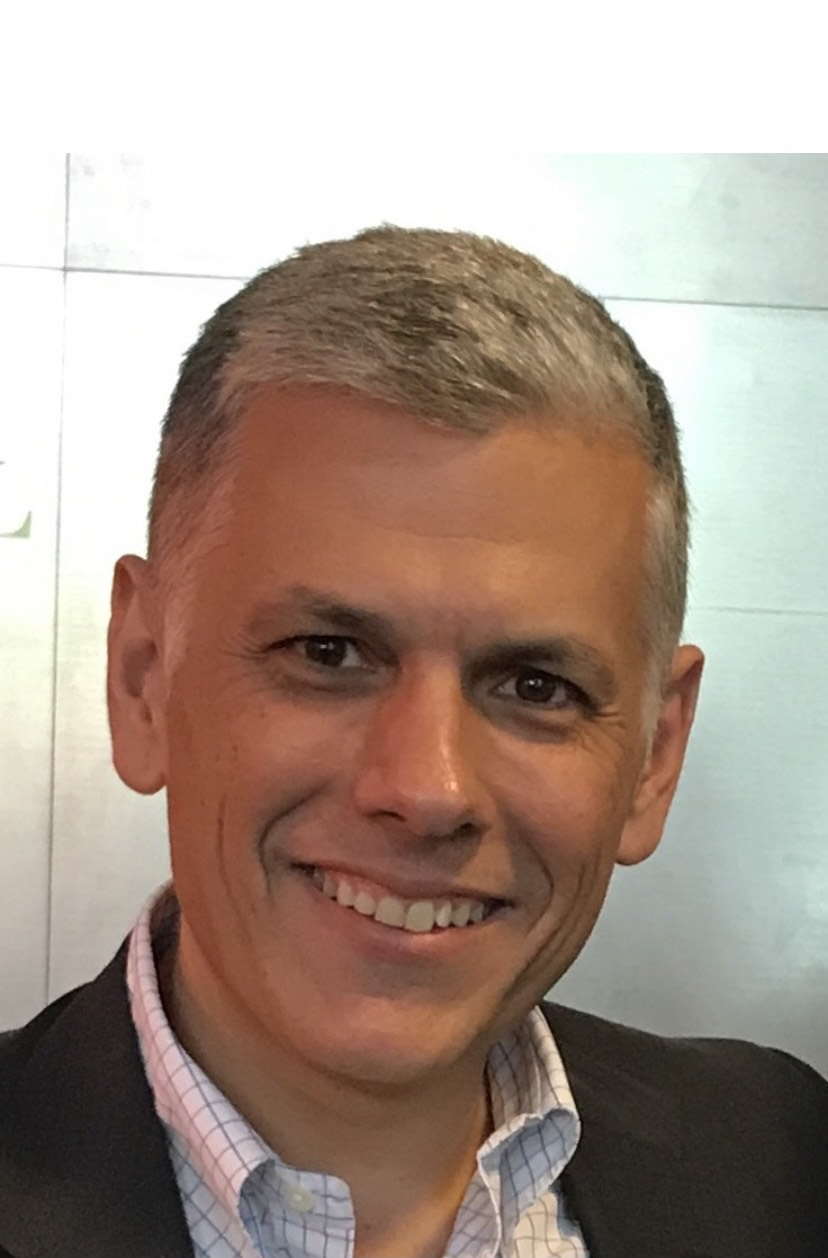
- Tan in 2022

President of Özyeğin University
- Incumbent
- Assumed office July 26, 2024
- Scientific career
- Education: Boğaziçi University (BS); University of Florida (MS, PhD)
- Awards: Turkish Academy of Sciences Distinguished Young Scholar Award; TÜBİTAK Fellowship; NATO Science Fellowship
- Fields: Industrial engineering; Business studies
- Workplaces: Özyeğin University; Koç University
- Thesis: A decomposition method for multistation production systems (1994)

Barış Tan is a Turkish industrial engineer, business scientist and academic, who is the President of Özyeğin University. He is most known for his research in the areas of production systems, supply chain management, and operations management. He served as the vice president of academic affairs, dean of College of Administrative Sciences and Economics and Director of Graduate School of Business at Koç University.

Tan has published over 100 papers and book chapters. He is the recipient of several best paper awards, and has been awarded Turkish Academy of Sciences Distinguished Young Scholar Award, TÜBİTAK fellowship, and NATO Science Fellowship. He served as the manufacturing area editor of Flexible Services and Manufacturing Journal and associate editor of IISE Transactions. He also serves in for-profit and non-profit organizations as a board member.

== Education ==
Tan received his bachelor's degree in Electrical and Electronics Engineering from Boğaziçi University in 1990. He then moved to the United States, earning his M.E. degree in Industrial and Systems Engineering in 1991, M.S.E. Graduate Certificate in Manufacturing Systems in 1993, and Ph.D. in Industrial and Systems Engineering in 1994, at the University of Florida.

== Career ==
Tan began his academic career as a Research Assistant in Industrial Research Laboratory at the University of Florida in 1991 during his PhD studies. In 1994, upon moving back to Turkey, he joined Koç University as an assistant professor in College of Administrative Sciences and Economics. He was promoted to associate professor in 1998, and became a professor in 2002. He served there as a professor of Operations Management and Industrial Engineering until 2024.

During his tenure at Koç University, Tan held several administrative appointments. He was the Dean of the College of Administrative Sciences and Economics during 2007–2013. Followed by this role, he served as vice president for Academic Affairs from 2013 till 2021. He served twice as Director of Graduate School of Business (2003-2005 and 2008–2010).

He started working as a Professor of Industrial Engineering and Operations Management at Özyeğin University in March 2024 and appointed as the President of the university on July 26, 2024.

Tan is a member of the external advisory board of Kyoto University Graduate School of Management (Japan) and LUMS (Pakistan). Moreover, he has served as the chair of the ISM University of Management and Economics Senate, a member of the advisory boards of Nottingham University Business School (United Kingdom), EM Lyon (France), and on the boards of CEMS Global Alliance in Management Education, European Foundation for Management Development, EQUIS, Turkish Quality Association, and Turkish Operations Research Society. He is also an independent board member of Anadolu Efes, Migros, and Anadolu Isuzu and CCI

Tan was a Fellow at the Cambridge Judge Business School in 2013, and was a visiting professor at the UCL School of Management from 2017 till 2019. Currently, he serves as a visiting professor at Politecnico di Milano, and Senior Research Fellow for ERA Project IN4ACT at Kaunas University of Technology. He has also been a visiting faculty at Harvard University and MIT.

== Research ==
Tan has focused his research on design and control of manufacturing systems, business model innovation, supply chain management, and stochastic modelling. His research has been supported by TUBITAK, European Union Horizon 2020 and Horizon Europe programs.

=== Design and Control of Production Systems ===
Tan developed analytical methods to determine performance measures (such as the throughput, distribution of amount of materials produced and cycle time related to material flow in production systems) to design and control of production systems. He developed analytical methods for the analysis of systems in which the material flow in production systems is modeled as a fluid. Tan also focused his research onto developing policies to control production resources dynamically to meet a random demand.

In 2005, he co-edited a book, Stochastic Modeling of Manufacturing Systems, and explored the development and analysis of performance evaluation models of manufacturing systems while utilizing decomposition-based methods, Markovian and queuing analysis, and inventory control approaches. His 2013 edited book presented the state of the art in stochastic modeling of manufacturing systems, with a particular emphasis on critical stochastic performance analysis as well as integrated optimization models of these systems.

More recently, he focuses on the modeling and data-driven control of production for energy efficiency. He developed an approach for data-driven modeling and analysis of manufacturing systems that combines analytical modeling, optimization, simulation and machine learning methodologies using high-performance computing.

=== Supply Chain Management ===
Tan's research in supply chain management focused on developing dynamic control policies for the use of production resources at different costs to meet variable demand, data-driven inventory management, and developing and analyzing cooperation-based business models. In early 2000s, he investigated the strategy of increasing production capacity temporarily through contingent contractual agreements with short-cycle manufacturers. He devised optimal control policies to use subcontractors together with the existing resources.

Tan has also worked on developing and analyzing cooperation-based business models. In his work related to data-driven inventory management, he developed methods to manage inventory accounting for substitution by using POS data. Tan also investigated the multi-product newsvendor problem while utilizing Value at Risk (VaR) as the risk measure in a newsvendor framework.

=== Stochastic Modelling ===
Tan developed stochastic models and analysis methods for the solution of different decision problems. Tan's research in the areas of stochastic modelling includes models developed for determining the risks of accidents caused by oil tankers passing through the Bosphorus, determining the agricultural planting planning that takes into account the risks of harvest, yield and demand, developing new methods for testing the efficiency of stock markets, developing a new modeling approach to compare the growth dynamics in emerging markets, and presenting modeling and analytical approaches for different decision problems such as choosing energy saving methods in buildings, developing new business models for financing energy saving investments, and launching and pricing new products.

== Awards and honors ==
- 1985-1990 TÜBİTAK Fellowship
- 1997 European Simulation Multiconference Best Paper Award
- 1999, 2000-2001 NATO Science Fellowship
- 2005 Distinguished Young Scholar Award (TUBA GEBIP), Turkish Academy of Sciences
- 2006-2007 TÜBİTAK Research Fellowship
- 2015 Best Paper Award, IIE Transactions, Focused Issue on Design and Manufacturing
- 2021 Outstanding Service Award, Koç University
- 2021 Outstanding Faculty Award, Koç University

== Bibliography ==
=== Books ===
- Stochastic Modeling of Manufacturing Systems: Advances in Design, Performance Evaluation, and Control Issues (2005) ISBN 9783540290575
- Handbook of Stochastic Models and Analysis of Manufacturing System Operations (2013) ISBN 9781461467779

=== Selected articles ===
- Tan, B., & Gershwin, S. B. (2004). Production and subcontracting strategies for manufacturers with limited capacity and volatile demand. Annals of Operations Research, 125(1), 205–232.
- Özler, A., Tan, B., & Karaesmen, F. (2009). Multi-product newsvendor problem with value-at-risk considerations. International Journal of Production Economics, 117(2), 244–255.
- Tan, B., & Gershwin, S. B. (2009). Analysis of a general Markovian two-stage continuous-flow production system with a finite buffer. International Journal of Production Economics, 120(2), 327–339.
- Tan, B., & Çömden, N. (2012). Agricultural planning of annual plants under demand, maturation, harvest, and yield risk. European Journal of Operational Research, 220(2), 539–549.
- Tan, B., Yavuz, Y., Otay, E. N., & Çamlıbel, E. (2016). Optimal selection of energy efficiency measures for energy sustainability of existing buildings. Computers & Operations Research, 66, 258–271.
