= Qatari Popular Committee to Support the Palestinian Intifada =

The Qatari Popular Committee to Support the Palestinian Intifada was a committee established in Doha between 1988 and 1994 to lend financial support to Palestinians during the first Intifada uprising.

In July 1988, six months following the start of the first Palestinian Intifada, around 300 wealthy and influential Arab intellectuals met in Sana’a, Yemen to discuss the creation of a civil committee in order to support the Palestinian cause. Also discussed was Iran-Iraq war, which was then in its seventh and final year, and the formation of local committees in every Arab country.

Upon returning to Doha, several Qatari businessmen had decided to establish the Qatari Popular Committee to Support the Palestinian Intifada. Among them was Khalid bin Mohammed al Rabban. Rabban, born in Doha in 1942, is a British educated businessman who now owns multiple corporations and deals primarily in trading.

The committee began its fundraising activities in 1988 and continued uninterrupted for six years, until the Qatar National Bank ordered their account to be shut down. The committee raised millions of riyals from private donations as well as monthly contributions from its members, which included over 70 wealthy Qatari businessmen. Furthermore, the committee had partnerships with various different pro-Palestinian organizations, including the Palestinian Cooperation Foundation.
