= QNB Syria =

Syrian bank

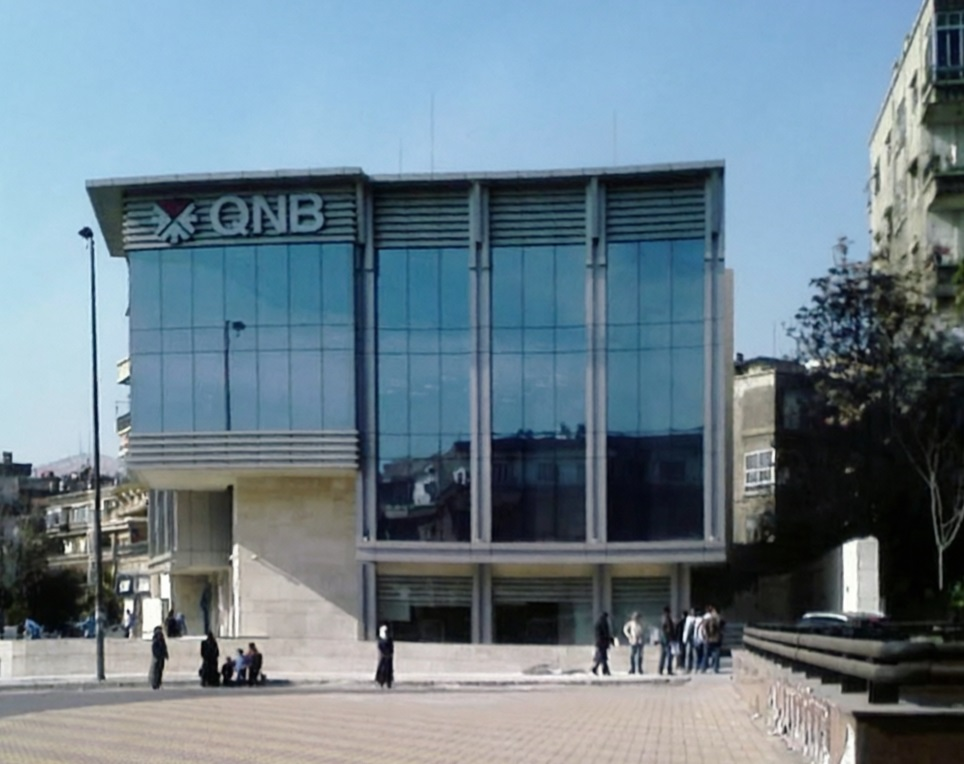
- Headquartes in Damascus
- Type: Subsidiary
- Traded as: DSE: QNBS
- ISIN: SY0021100142
- Industry: Financial services
- Founded: 2009
- Headquarters: Damascus, Syria
- Number of locations: 15 (2025)
- Area served: Syria
- Key people: Nedal Nasrawin (Country Manager)
- Total assets: USD 260 millions (2024)
- Number of employees: 400 (2025)
- Parent: QNB Group
- Website: qnbsyria/

QNB Syria, also referred as QNBS, is a major Syrian bank. Subsidiary of the Qatari QNB Group.

== History ==
In 2009, QNB Group, seized this opportunity to expand its footprint across the Levant. QNB Syria was established as a Syrian Public Joint Stock Company, with QNB Group retaining a dominant majority stake (over 50%) and the remaining shares floating locally.

QNBS quickly registered on the newly minted Damascus Securities Exchange (DSE), which officially launched trading in March 2009.

The outbreak of the Syrian civil war in 2011 fundamentally altered the bank's operational reality. QNBS originally have 15 registered branches across major urban economic centers. As security conditions shifted and various regions faced instability, the bank was forced to consolidate, leaving 8 active branches fully operational in government-secured zones (primarily Damascus, Tartus, Latakia, and Aleppo). Heavy international sanctions, hyperinflation of the Syrian Pound (SYP), and the contraction of the formal private sector meant that QNBS transitioned into an asset-preservation mode. Despite the harsh environment, QNB Group chose not to divest or shut down the subsidiary entirely, retaining its physical corporate infrastructure in Damascus.

Amidst the political vacuum and transition of power, the Damascus Securities Exchange temporarily closed its doors in December 2024 to protect the financial sector from a chaotic market crash. After a six-month hiatus, the DSE officially reopened on June 2, 2025, restructuring itself with a private-company model aimed at digital transparency and economic rebuilding. QNBS resumed trading on the exchange under its symbol QNBS.

In May 2026, QNB Group became the first bank globally to enable international payment card acceptance and digital checkout networks inside Syria. This was made possible after authorization from the Central Bank of Syria and an alliance with Mastercard.

== See also ==
- List of banks in Syria
- QNB Turkey
- QNB Egypt
