= QNB Tunisia =

Tunisian bank

- Type: Subsidiary
- Industry: Financial services
- Founded: March 3, 1982; 44 years ago
- Headquarters: Tunis, Tunisia
- Number of locations: 29 (2025)
- Area served: Tunisia
- Key people: Lotfi Debbabi (Country Manager)
- Revenue: USD 15 millions (2024)
- Operating income: USD 56,4 millions (2024)
- Total assets: USD 682,5 millions (2024)
- Total equity: USD 99,8 millions (2024)
- Number of employees: 400 (2025)
- Parent: QNB Group
- Website: qnb.com.tn

QNB Tunisia, formerly referred as Tunisian Qatari Bank, is a medium-sized Tunisian bank. Subsidiary of the Qatari QNB Group.

== History ==
The bank was founded as the Tunisian-Qatari Investment Bank (TQB) under an agreement signed on March 3, 1982, between Qatar and Tunisia.

Following the decision of the interministerial council on February 11, 2002, the bank became an universal bank after agreement from both shareholder states. In 2004, TQB was the first bank to obtain approval from the Tunisian state to operate as a credit institution with the status of a universal bank, rather than an investment bank.

On April 1, 2013, TQB adopted a new name, Qatar National Bank Tunisia, following the acquisition by the QNB Group of almost all of the Tunisian state's shares.

In 2013, Bloomberg Markets magazine awarded QNB Group the title of World's Strongest Bank on a list of 78 banks worldwide.

== See also ==
- List of banks in Tunisia
