= Segrdkan, Iraq =

Village in Iraq

Segrdkan
- Village
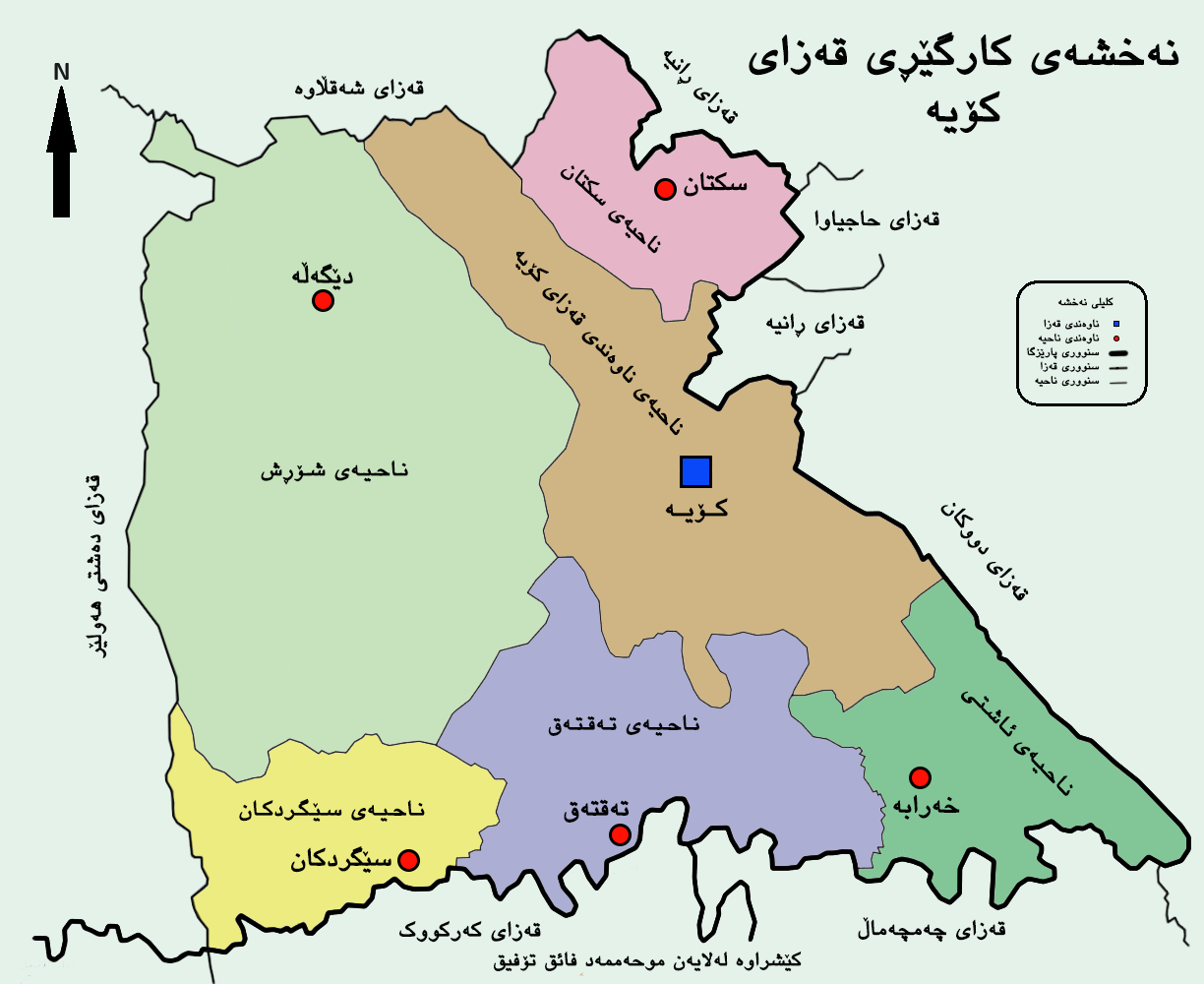
- Map of the subdistricts of Koy Sinjaq District.

- Location in Iraq Segrdkan (Iraqi Kurdistan)
- Coordinates: 35.87177°N 44.44199°E
- Country: Iraq
- Region: Kurdistan Region
- Governorate: Erbil Governorate
- District: Koy Sinjaq District
- Sub-district: Segrdkan

Population (2014)
  - Village: 3,505
  - Urban: 1,308
  - Rural: 2,197

Segrdkan (Kurdish: سێگردکان, romanized: Sêgirdikan) is a village and subdistrict in Erbil Governorate in the Kurdistan Region, Iraq. It is located in Koy Sinjaq District. It is the administrative centre of Segrdkan Subdistrict.
