= Taqtaq District =

District in Erbil Governorate, Kurdistan Region, Iraq

Taqtaq District قەزای تەقتەق
- District
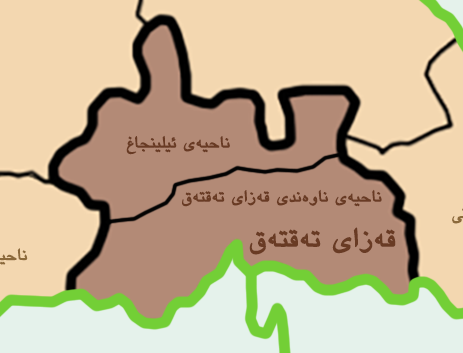
- Map of the district

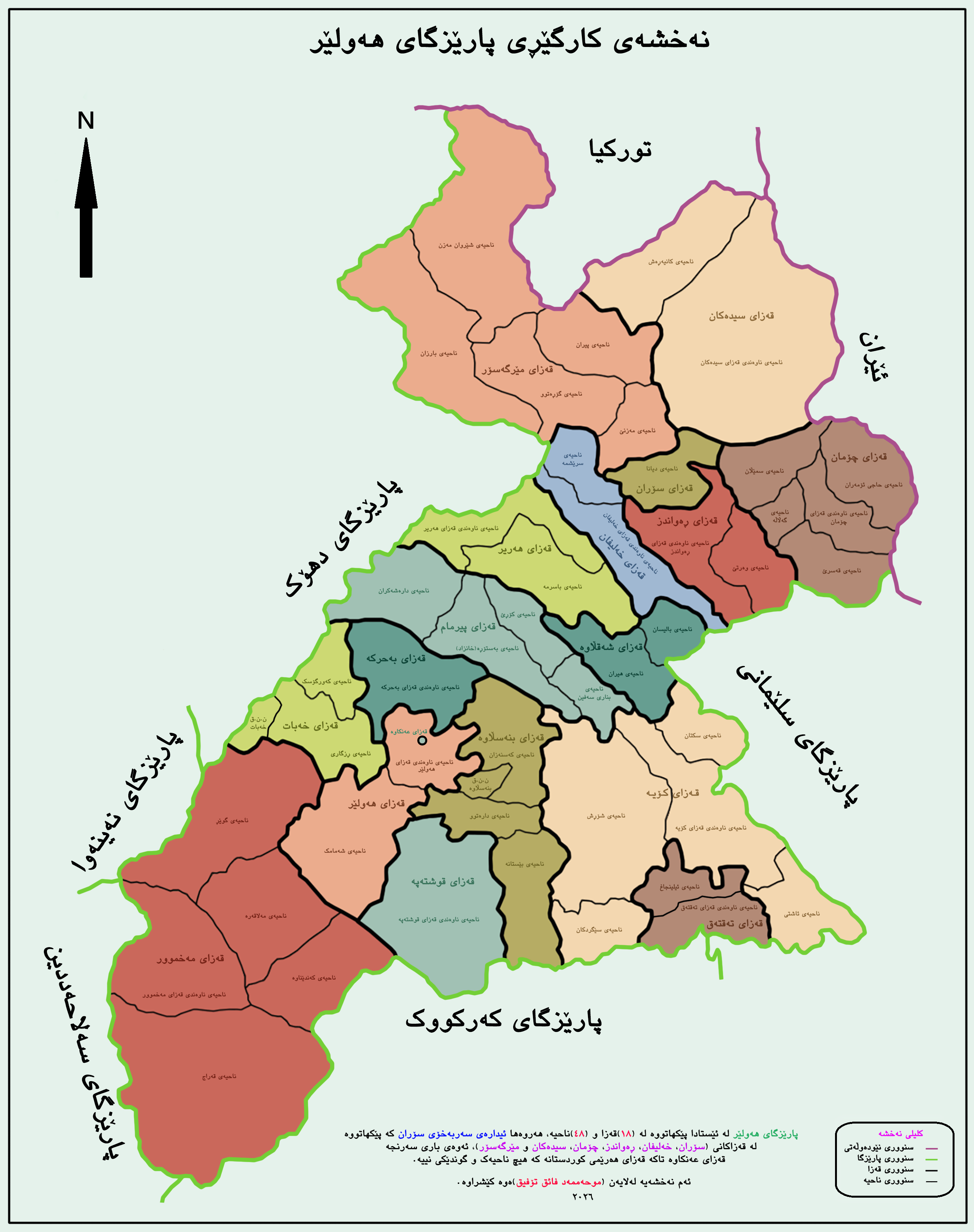
- A new map of the Erbil Governorate, containing the Taqtaq District.
- Country: Iraq
- Region: Kurdistan Region
- Governorate: Erbil Governorate
- Elevated to district: October 13, 2024
- Seat: Taqtaq

Government
  - District Commissioner: Aso Mustafa Abdullah

Population (2024)
  - Total: 19,759
- Time zone: UTC+3 (AST)

Taqtaq District (Kurdish: قەزای تەقتەق, romanized: Qezay Teqteq) is a newly formed district in the Erbil Governorate in Kurdistan Region, Iraq. The seat of the district is Taqtaq. The district contains two subdistricts, Taqtaq Central Subdistrict and Ilinjakh Subdistrict[ckb], which was established on May 22, 2025. The district used to be a subdistrict in Koya District, but was then was elevated into a district on October 13, 2024. The decision followed a proposal from the Kurdistan Regional Government. Taqtaq District also maintains the same area as the Taqtaq Subdistrict.

== History ==
Taqtaq used to be a subdistrict in the Koy Sinjaq District. However, on September 25, 2024, Masrour Barzani stated that Taqtaq should become a district and signed an order. Then, on October 13, 2024, President Nechirvan Barzani signed a decree that officially elevated Taqtaq to a district. The decree also stated that the newly formed Taqtaq District maintains the same boundaries as the Taqtaq Subdistrict. The decree took effect immediately on October 14, 2024.

On May 22, 2025, Nechirvan Barzani issued a decree establishing the Ilinjakh Subdistrict within Taqtaq District. The designation as a sub-district aimed to enhance service delivery to local villages and improve the provision of public services to the area's inhabitants.

== Events ==
=== Drone crashes ===
On June 19, 2025, a drone crashed near Tazede, a village in Taqtaq District, igniting a fire but causing no casualties, local officials confirmed.

Aso Mustafa Abdullah, the district commissioner and the mayor of Taqtaq, told Rudaw that it was not yet known where the drone was directed from, and that security forces had begun an investigation. The drone crash, however, did coincide with the Twelve-Day War.

=== Floods ===
In December 2025, heavy rainfall caused floods that devastated Taqtaq District, damaging the fish farm industry. On December 9, 2025, the floods destroyed more than 200 fish farms and killed more than 800,000 fish. The New Generation Movement reported losses of one billion Iraqi dinars (around 760,000 USD). Sabah Osman, head of the agriculture department in Taqtaq, stated that 250 fish farms were affected. Many of the fish farms, however, were built illegally without permits, making them vulnerable to flooding.

In response to the flooding, a delegation representing Qubad Talabani, the deputy prime minister, visited the district to review the damage the flood had done to fish farms and agricultural lands. However, some farmers reported that they had yet to receive concrete government compensation.

== See also ==
- Koy Sinjaq District
- Erbil Governorate
- Districts of Iraq
- Kurdistan Region
