= Hüsnü Özyeğin =

Turkish businessman (born 1944)

- Born: 1 September 1944 (age 81); İzmir, Turkey
- Education: Robert College
- Alma mater: Oregon State University (B.Sc.); Harvard Business School (MBA)
- Occupation: Businessman
- Known for: Founder of Finansbank
- Spouse: Married
- Children: 2, including Murat

Hüsnü Özyeğin (born 1 September 1944) is a Turkish billionaire businessman. He founded Finansbank in 1987 and later sold the Turkish division of the bank. Nowadays, his financial investments are managed under Fiba Holding while non-financial investments are managed under Fina Holding.

== Background ==
The son of a doctor, Özyeğin was born in 1944 in İzmir, Turkey. He graduated from Robert College, in Istanbul in 1963, and has said that he went to the US with just a thousand dollars in his pocket. There, he studied civil engineering at Oregon State University. He then earned an MBA from Harvard Business School.

== Career ==
Following his return home after three more years in the US, Özyeğin was offered a post in Pamukbank, which belonged to his schoolmate, Mehmet Emin Karamehmet. In 1977, at the age of only 32, he was appointed general manager of this bank and he held this position until 1984. Then he transferred to Yapı ve Kredi Bankası to become its general manager, a much larger bank in Turkey acquired that year by the same friend. There he succeeded in leading the money-losing bank to a profit over the next two years.

Özyeğin led Yapı ve Kredi Bankası until 1987, when he decided to establish his own bank, Finansbank, at the age of 43. He expanded it to a bank with more than 200 branches operating in nine countries out of Turkey, mostly in Europe. He later founded several finance companies and brought them under the Holding Fiba, which has around 8,500 employees in 20 companies. Over the next few years, he invested in high-demand industries such as real estate, energy and retail, building condominiums and shopping centers across the main domestic business districts. In 1996, he entered the retail business purchasing the supermarket chains Gima, Endi, Spar and Greens. Furthermore, Özyeğin signed a franchising contract with the British retail chain Marks & Spencer, and then also purchased the Sakura Bank.

In 2005, Özyeğin sold the supermarket chain named GIMA to Sabancı Holding, and acquired in exchange the five-star hotel Swissotel in Istanbul from its Japanese owners. In April 2006, he sold 46% of the shares of the Turkish branch of Finansbank, worth US$2.774 billion, to National Bank of Greece, the largest and the oldest commercial bank in Greece. He sold his remaining 9% stake for US$700 million in 2008. He was expected to remain the bank's chairman of the board of directors for two more years.

The non-Turkish part of Finansbank was placed under the Dutch holding and rebranded into Credit Europe Bank. Özyeğin is the main shareholder and board member of this bank. At the end of 2008, Credit Europe Bank N.V. employed over 6,000 professionals working in the euro-zone countries Belgium, Germany, Malta and the Netherlands as well as in China, Dubai, Russia, Romania, Switzerland, Turkey and Ukraine, serving more than 3 million customers worldwide.

Özyeğin was awarded "Businessman of the Year" in 2000 by the Turkish magazine "Ekonomist". In an interview for the Creating Emerging Markets project at the Harvard Business School, he describes his commitment to expanding education opportunities for women.

Özyeğin University in Istanbul was founded by the Hüsnü M. Özyeğin Foundation in May 2007. Özyeğin plans to spend up to $1 billion over the next 15 years on the university.

Fiba Group is part owner of Kınık coal mine.

== Personal life ==
Özyeğin is married, with two children, and lives in Istanbul, Turkey.

== See also ==
- List of Turks by net worth
