= Swissôtel The Bosphorus =

Hotel in Istanbul, Turkey

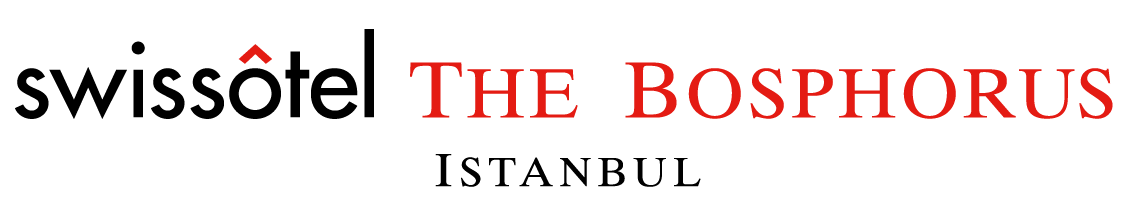

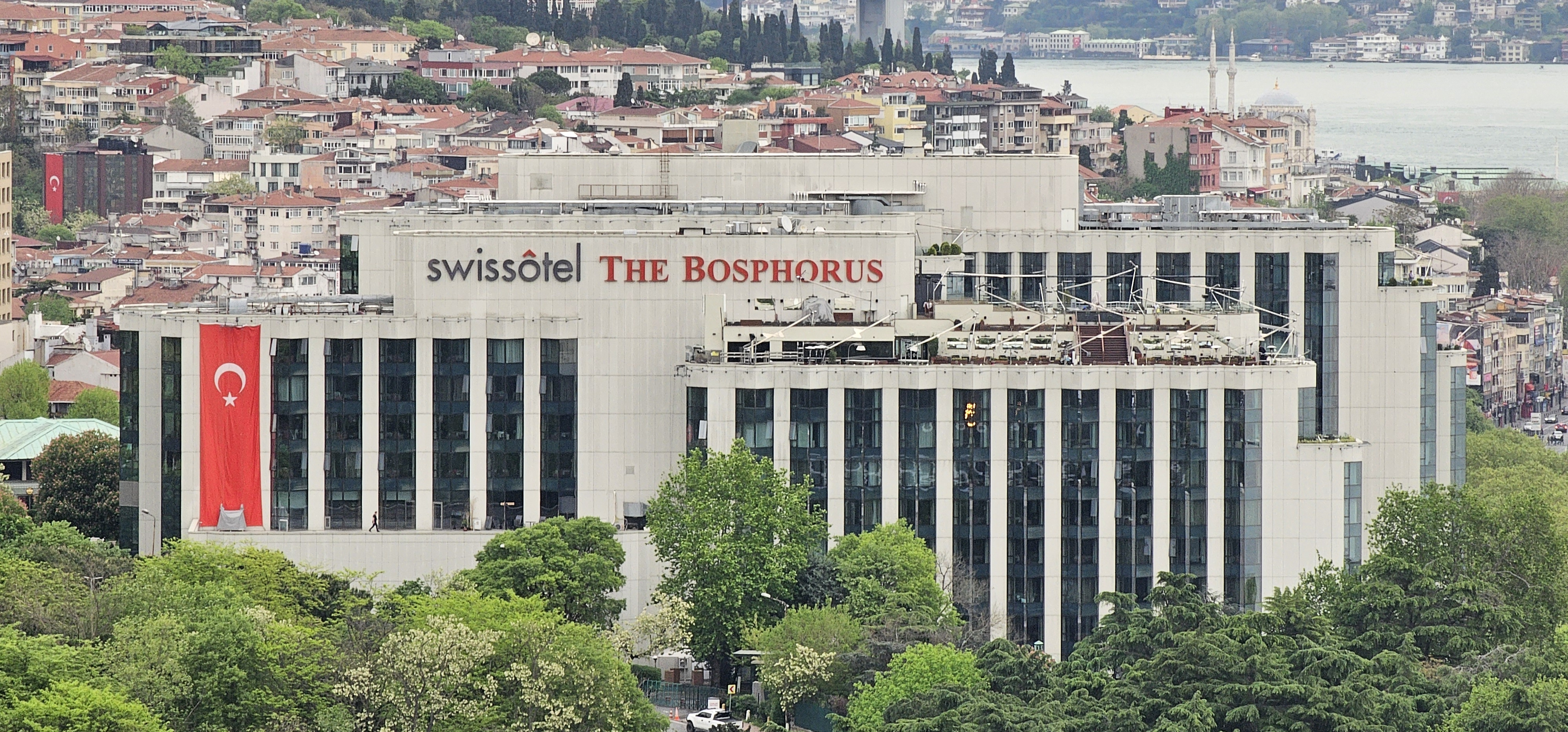

- Location within Istanbul

General information
- Location: Bayildim Cad. No.2 Macka ▪ 34357 Besiktas Istanbul
- Coordinates: 41°02′27″N 28°59′52″E
- Opening: 1991
- Operator: Swissôtel

Height
- Height: 60 metres (200 ft)

Technical details
- Floor count: 20

Design and construction
- Architect: Kanko Kikaku Sekkeisha

Other information
- Number of rooms: 560
- Number of restaurants: 10

Website
- www.swissotel.com

Swissôtel The Bosphorus is a luxury hotel in Istanbul and is managed by the Swissôtel. The hotel is located in the centre of Istanbul, the largest city in Turkey, on the European banks of the Bosphorus. The hotel is member of The Leading Hotels of the World.

== History ==
Designed by Kanko Kikaku Sekkeisha, the hotel was built in 1989 by Anadolu Japan Turizm AS and opened in 1991. In 2011 the new Swissôtel Living concept was launched allowing people to rent apartments and make use of all the services and facilities of the hotel. The hotel is under a renovation project which is scheduled to finish in December 2015.

In 2011, The hotel worked with 20 local artists to create an art initiative that raised almost €200,000 towards supporting young children through various training programs.

In 2012, the hotel hosted the World Economic Forum (WEF). In 2012 the hotel won the World Luxury Hotel Awards for Turkey's Best Luxury Hotel and in 2013 it won the World Luxury Hotel Awards for Europe's Best Luxury Hotel.

== Recreational facilities ==
• Outdoor Pool
• Health Club
• Indoor Pool
• Tennis
• Whirlpool
• Spa/Salon
