= Koya University =

Public university in Koy Sanjaq, Iraq

Coordinates: 36°5′58″N 44°38′53″E

- زانکۆی کۆیه
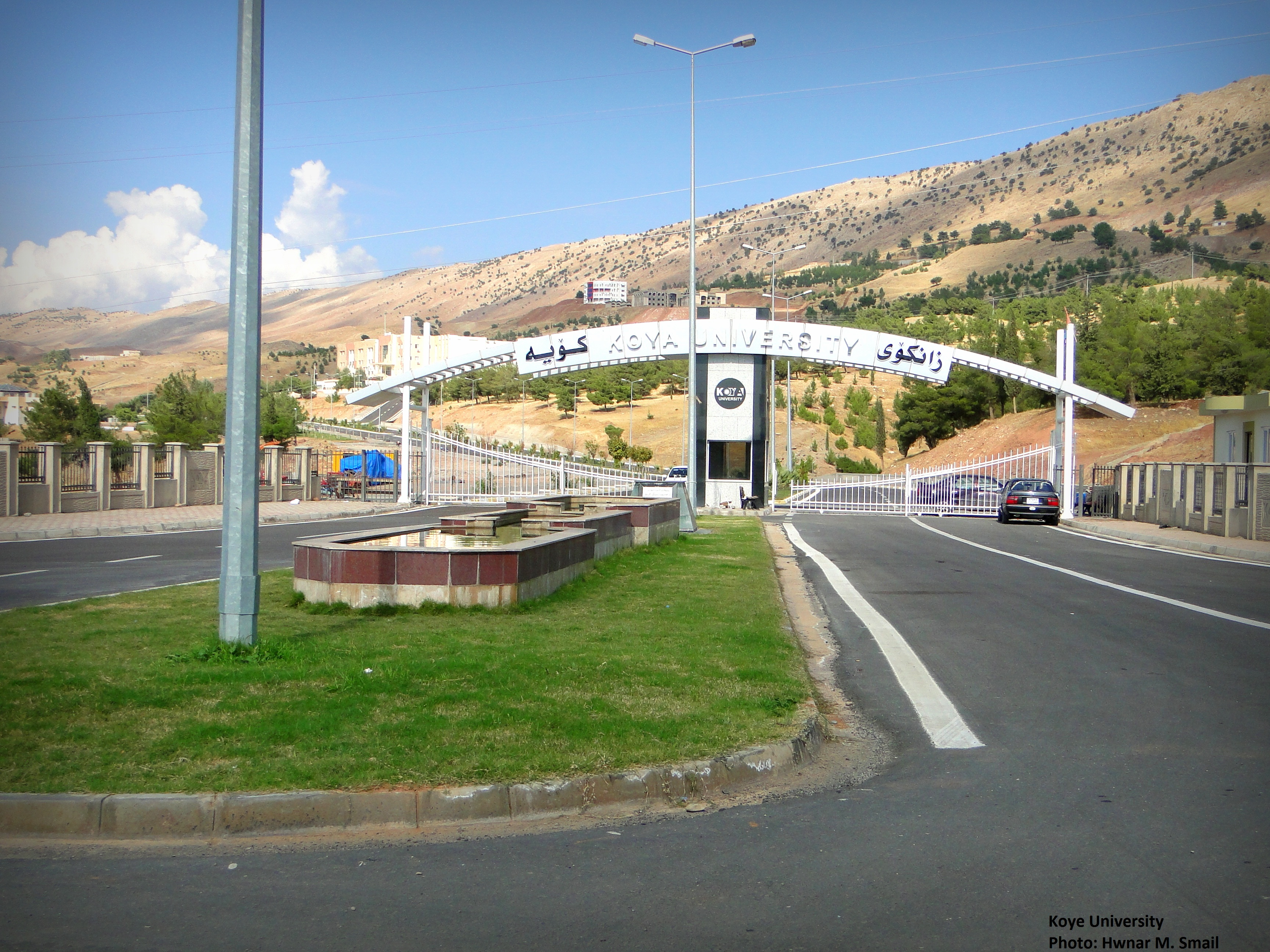
- Koya University
- Motto: A University for Stronger Society
- Type: Public university
- Established: 2003
- President: Mohammed Haseeb Zangana
- Administrative staff: Nearly 100
- Students: 2,452
- Undergraduates: 1,274
- Postgraduates: 200 - 300
- Location: Koya, Iraqi Kurdistan, Iraq
- Campus: Urban
- Colors: Yellow and Green
- Website: www.koyauniversity.org
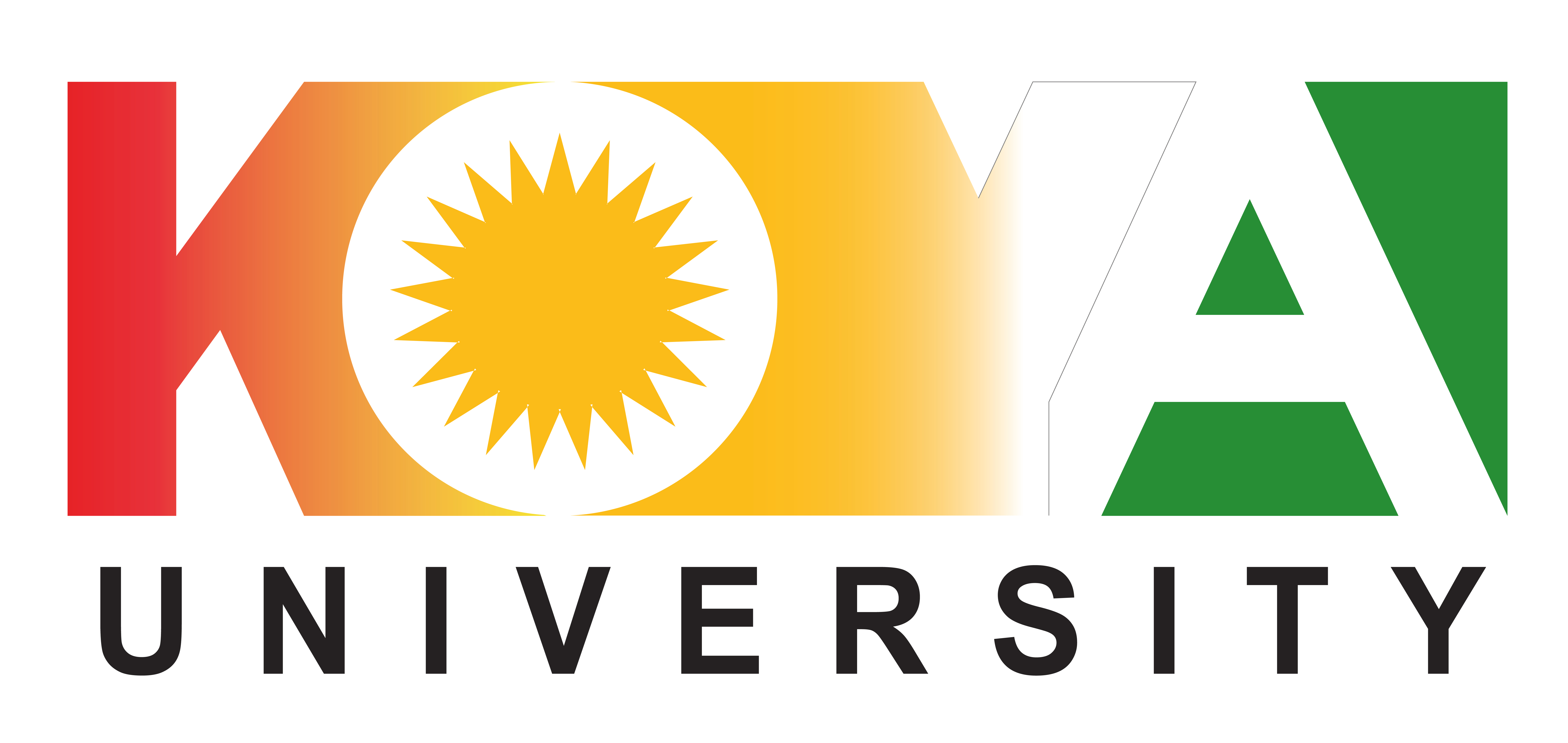

Koya University (Kurdish: زانکۆی کۆیە romanized: Zankoy Koye) is a public university located in Koy Sanjaq, near Erbil (Hewlêr), the capital of the Erbil Governorate in the Iraqi Kurdistan region of Iraq. It was established in 2003 by Jalal Talabani.

== History ==
The Kurdistan Regional Government opened colleges of Education and Sharia and Law during the academic year 2000–2001 in Koya, that were affiliated with University of Sulaymaniyah. Later, they became the foundation of Koya University.

Koya University was established at the beginning of the academic year 2003–2004. The first graduation session of Koya University was held on July, 20th, 2006.

== Colleges ==
In 2010, Koya University was restructured from colleges to faculty systems to enhance the interactions between similar academic fields. Today the University has four faculties and 25 departments in different fields.

The educational programmes include both bachelor's and master's degree and doctoral programmes.

- Faculty of Engineering (FENG)
- Faculty of Science and Health (FSCH)
- Faculty of Humanity and Social Science (FHSS)
- Faculty of Education (FEDU)

In January 2017, Koya University opened an English teaching center. As of 2019, Koya University has 440 academic staff.

== See also ==
- List of universities in Iraq
