= Murat Aras =

Turkish screenplay writer

Murat Aras is a Turkish screenplay writer. Born in Ankara on 4 July 1973. He went to Naval High School in Heybeliada, Istanbul and studied economics at university.

His career writing for television series began in 1999 writing for one of the first sitcoms in Turkey, "Ayrilsak da Beraberiz". After writing 220 episodes for the show, he moved on to make a success of another comedy show television series began in 2001 writing for one of the second sitcoms in Turkey, "En Son Babalar Duyar".

== Writer filmography ==
- Ayrilsak da Beraberiz (1999)
- En Son Babalar Duyar (2001)
- Karim ve Annem (2004)
- Iki Arada Ask (2005)
- Benden Baba Olmaz (2007)
- Yalancı Romantik (2008)
- Papatyam (2008)
- Seksenler (2012)
