= Aras Koyi =

- ئاراس کۆیی
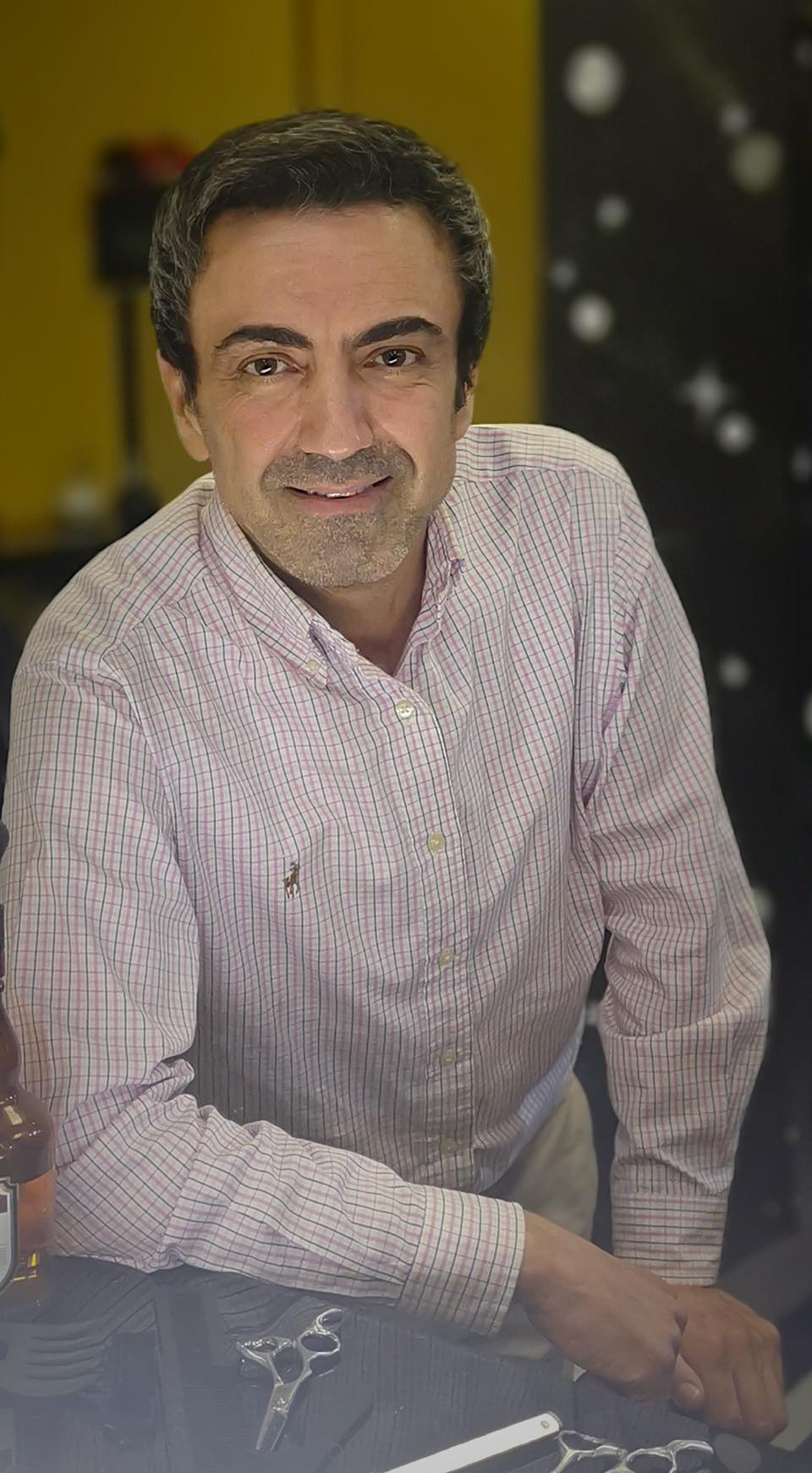
- Born: Aras Fatih Rasul; September 26, 1972 (age 53); Koy Sanjaq, Iraq
- Other name: Aras Koyi
- Education: Moscow State Art and Cultural University
- Notable work: Negezi! Tomato; My Kurdistan
- Style: Pop
- Website: araskoyi.com

Aras Fatih Rasul (born September 26, 1972), known by the stage names Aras Koyi (Kurdish: ئاراس کۆیی), is a Kurdish-Swedish singer, songwriter, director, scenarist, producer and philanthropist.

== Early life and education ==
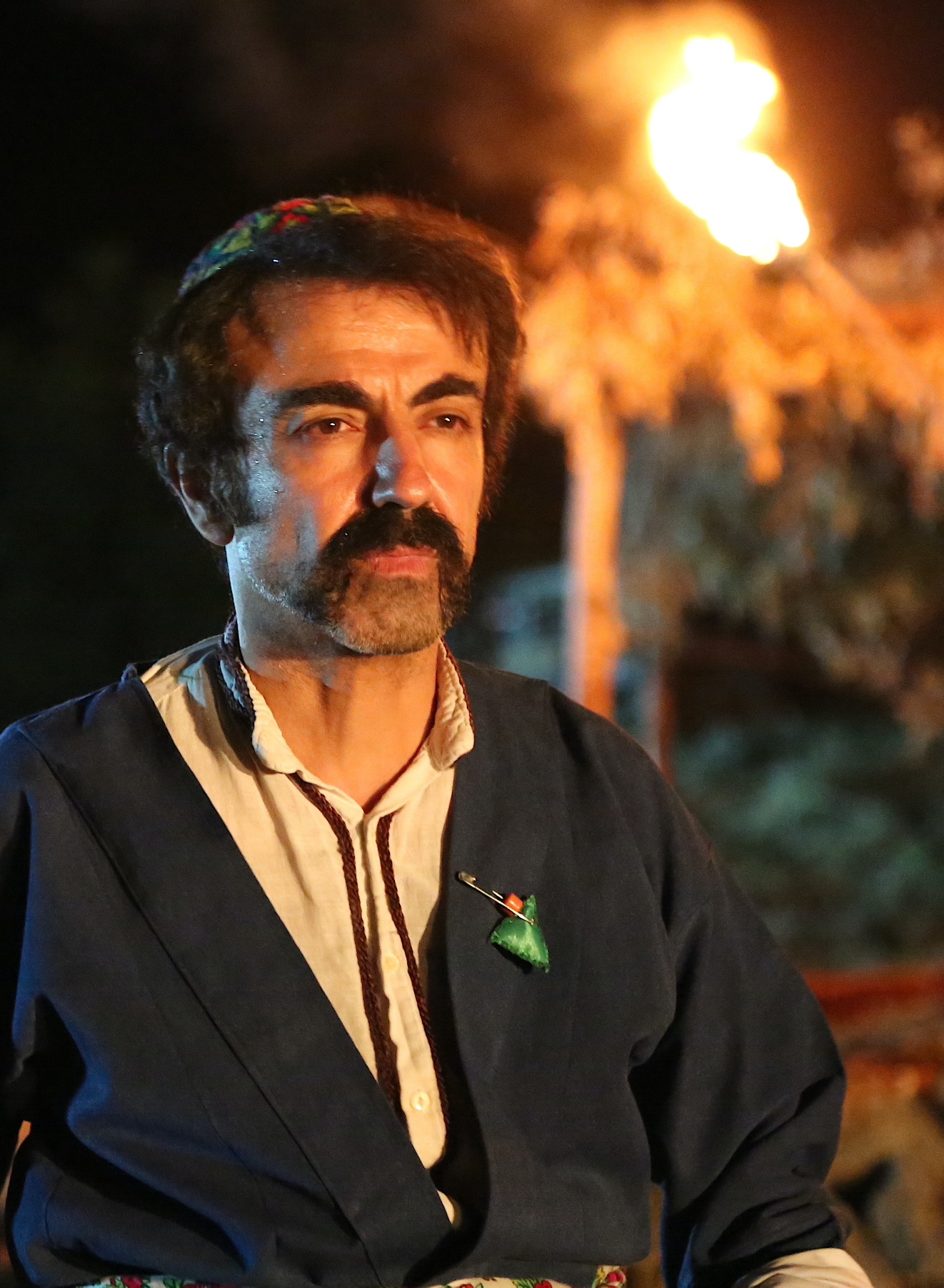
A still from Sawar "Bulgur" song.

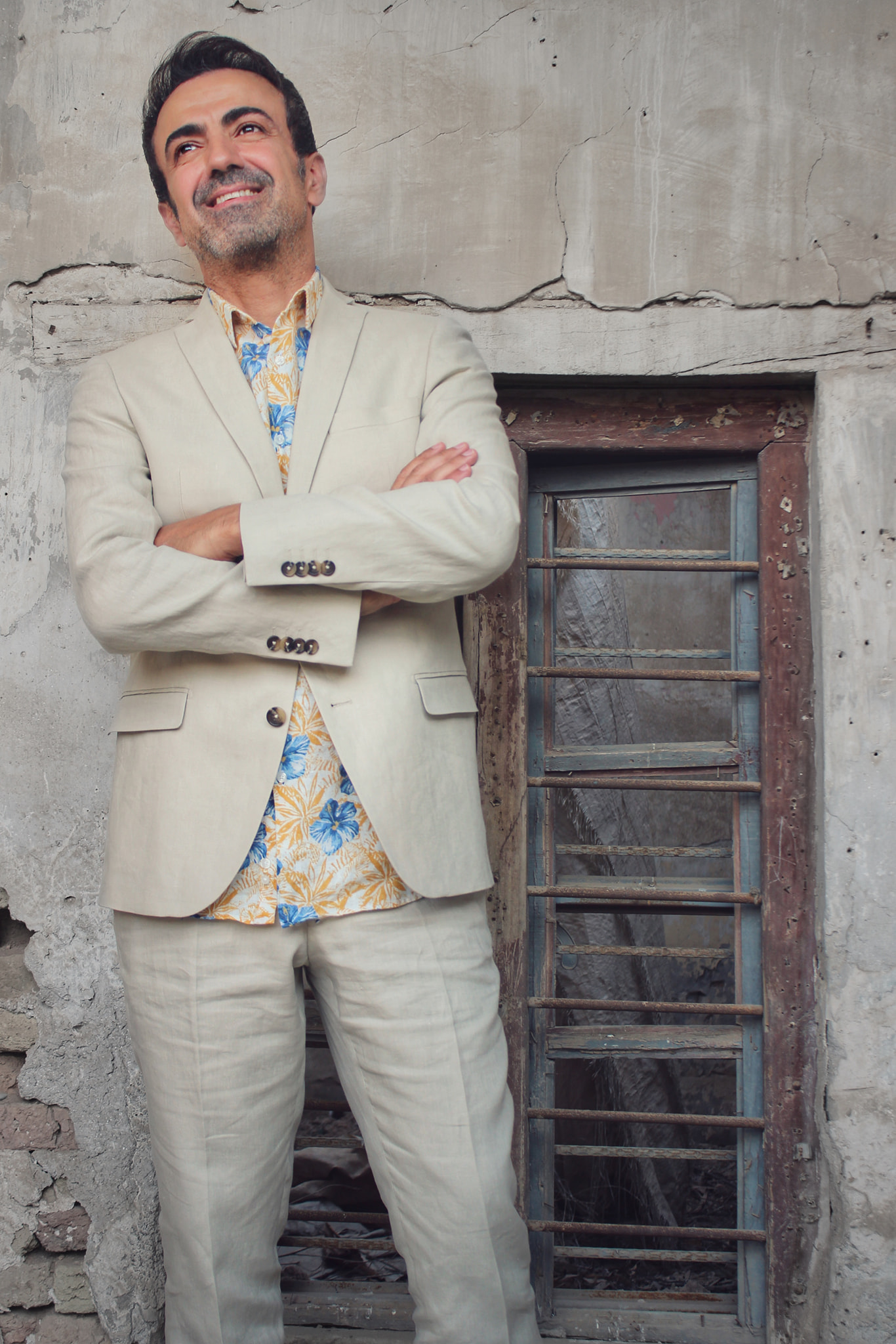
Aras Koyi

Aras Fatih Rasul was born in Koy Sanjaq. His family was forced to leave Iraq in 1981 due to the political activities of his father, Fatih Rasul. His father Fatih was a Peshmerga who faced imprisonments, and ultimately, exile. When he was a young boy, Koyi lived in Soviet Union, where he continued his studies at Interdom in the city of Ivanovo.

After finishing high school in 1990, he moved to the Eskilstuna in Sweden where he reunited with his long-separated family. In 1993, he returned to Moscow, where he began his studies to become a film director at the Moscow State Art and Cultural University. During his studies, Koyi began writing songs. He graduated in 1997 and moved back to his family in Sweden.

== Career ==
Koyi's first CD single "Tap-Tap" was released in 1999. It included an English version of "Tap-Tap", a Kurdish version of "Tap-Tap (Footsteps)", the song "Nask u Nerm (Delicately, Softly)" and "Destekant Bine (Give Me Your Hands)". In 2000, Aras Koyi started his own music company, Arasia Media Services and Production. In August 2001, he released a CD single and music video called "Tomato". It was inspired by the annual La Tomatina festival in the town of Buñol, Spain.

== Discography ==
=== CD ===
| Title | in English | Year | Notes |
|---|---|---|---|
| Tap-tap | Footsteps | 1999 | Released in English and Kurdish version. |
| Dildar | Lover | 1999 | Aras produced this CD Album for his brother Hogir. |
| Tomato | Tomato | 2000 | CD single |
| From Aras to.... | From Aras to.... | 2003 | Album |

=== Music video ===
| Title | in English | Year | Notes |
|---|---|---|---|
| Tomato | Tomato | 2002 | |
| Basi To | Talks about you | 2003 | |
| Hangaw Mane | Don't take that step | 2004 | |
| Gez Neke (Short film) | Don't Bite | 2005 | Include songs (Khapa Gyan, 100 Mashallah, Skallay Dill and Tomato) |
| Betak u Beko | One or More | 2008 | Filmed in Greece |
| Remda Remda | Please, Let me | 2008 | |
| Yadi Caran | Old Memories | 2008 | |
| Kurdistana Min | My Kurdistan | 2013 | |
| Darje | Spilled Milk | 2020 | |
| Sawar | Bulgur | 2022 | |
| Hawari Hunar | The Chant of Art | 2024 | |
