= Flexible Services and Manufacturing Journal =

- Discipline: Manufacturing engineering
- Language: English
- Edited by: Andrea Matta

Publication details
- Former name: International Journal of Flexible Manufacturing Systems
- History: 1988-present
- Publisher: Springer Science+Business Media
- Frequency: Quarterly
- Impact factor: 3.2 (2024)

Standard abbreviations
- ISO 4: Flex. Serv. Manuf. J.

Indexing
- ISSN: 1936-6582 (print); 1936-6590 (web)
- OCLC no.: 122564432

Links
- Journal homepage; Online Archive

The Flexible Services and Manufacturing Journal is a peer-reviewed academic journal published by Springer Science+Business Media. The journal was originally published under the title "International Journal of Flexible Manufacturing Systems" and Kathryn Stecke was the founding editor-in-chief. The journal publishes research in the field of services and manufacturing management. All aspects in this field including the interface between engineering and management, the design and analysis of service and manufacturing systems as well as operational planning and decision support systems are covered.

== Abstracting and indexing ==
The Flexible Services and Manufacturing Journal is abstracted and indexed in the Journal Citation Reports, Research Papers in Economics SCImago Journal Rank, Scopus, Science Citation Index, among others. According to the Journal Citation Reports, the journal has a 2019 impact factor of 2.368, ranking it 24th out of 48 journals in the category "Engineering, Industrial", 29th out of 50 journals in the category "Engineering, Manufacturing" and 32nd out of 83 journals in the category "Operations Research & Management Science".
