= Koy Sanjaq =

- Town
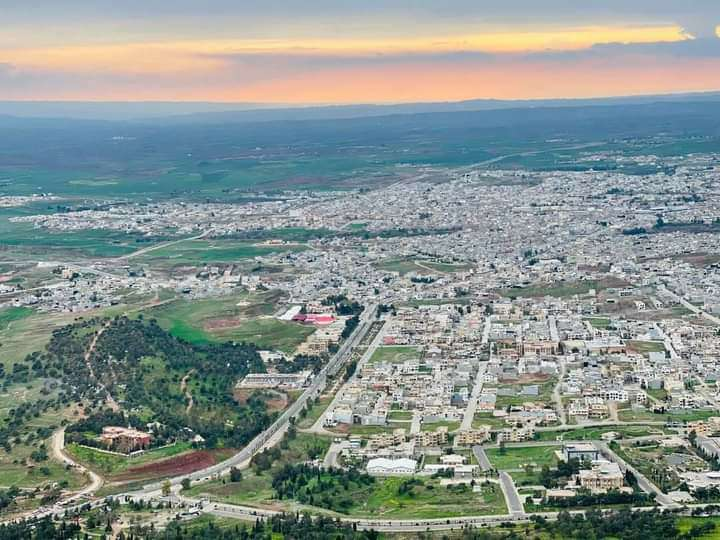

- Location in Iraq Koy Sanjaq (Iraqi Kurdistan)
- Coordinates: 36°04′54″N 44°37′42″E
- Country: Iraq
- Region: Kurdistan Region
- Governorate: Erbil Governorate
- District: Koy Sinjaq District

Area
  - Total: 2,050 km^{2} (790 sq mi)

Population (2013)
  - Total: 21,026
- Time zone: UTC+3

Koy Sanjaq is a town in Erbil Governorate in Kurdistan Region, northern Iraq. (Note: (Arabic: كويسنجق; Hebrew: כוי סנג’ק; Kurdish: کۆیە, romanized: Koye; Syriac: ܟܘܝܐ). Alternatively transliterated as Kūsanjaq, Koi Sanjaq, Kou Senjaq, Koisanjaq, Köy Sancak, Köi Sanjaq, Kuway Sandjaq, Kou Senjak, Kuysanjaq, Koysancak. Also known as Koya.) It is the administrative centre of the Koy Sinjaq District.

== Etymology ==
The name of the town is derived from "köy" ("village" in Turkish) and "sanjaq" ("flag" in Turkish), and thus Koy Sanjaq translates to "village of the flag".

== History ==
According to local tradition, Koy Sanjaq was founded by the son of an Ottoman sultan who planted his flag and established a garrison at the site of a seasonal bazaar after having defeated a rebellion at Baghdad, and developed into a town as locals moved to the settlement to provide services to the soldiers. A Jewish community at Koy Sanjaq is first mentioned in the late 18th century, by which time it was already well established. The community had its own graveyard, and spoke both Jewish Neo-Aramaic and Sorani Kurdish. A small Chaldean Catholic community was established in the town in the 19th century. In 1913, 200 Chaldean Catholics populated Koy Sanjaq, and were served by two priests and one functioning church as part of the archdiocese of Kirkuk. The Chaldean Catholic Church of Mar Yousif was constructed in 1923.

The Iraqi census of 1947 recorded a total population of 8198 people, with 7746 Muslims, 268 Jews, and 184 Christians. 80-100 Jews from the village of Betwata took refuge in the town for several months in 1950, increasing the size of the local community to 350–400 people. The Jews of Koy Sanjaq emigrated to Israel in the following year. Koy Sanjaq had a population of 10,379 in 1965. In 1994, the town was struck by Iranian airstrikes targeting the Kurdistan Democratic Party (KDP) base, resulting in the death of a civilian and wounding three KDP militants. In 1999, Assyrians from the nearby village of Armota protested the construction of a mosque in their village at Koy Sanjaq. Koya University was established in 2003.

35 displaced Assyrian families from Mosul were housed in a converted church building in the town in November 2014, and had not been rehoused as of April 2015. On 21 December 2016, a car bomb attack targeted offices of the Democratic Party of Iranian Kurdistan, killing seven and wounding 15. As of March 2018, 60 Assyrian families inhabit Koy Sanjaq. The Assyrian population largely speak Kurdish, but some continue to speak Syriac. An Iranian ballistic missile attack on the Democratic Party of Iranian Kurdistan and Kurdistan Democratic Party headquarters in the town on 8 September 2018 killed 18 people and injured 50.

== Notable people ==
- Haji Qadir Koyi (1817–1897), Kurdish poet
- Dildar (1918–1948), Kurdish poet
- Fuad Masum (b. 1938), Kurdish politician and President of Iraq (2014–2018)
- Karim Ahmed (1922–2022), Kurdish politician
- Lahur Talabani (b. 1975), Kurdish politician
- Aras Koyi (b. 1972), Kurdish-Swedish singer
- Dlawer Ala'Aldeen (b. 1960), clinical microbiologist and immunologist

== See also ==
- Şêxbizin (tribe)

== Bibliography ==
- Lalik, Krzysztof (2018). "Ethnic and Religious Factors of Chaldo-Assyrian Identity in an Interface with the Kurds in Iraqi Kurdistan". In Joanna Bocheńska (ed.). Rediscovering Kurdistan's Cultures and Identities: The Call of the Cricket. Springer.
- Mutzafi, Hezy (2004). The Jewish Neo-Aramaic Dialect of Koy Sanjaq (Iraqi Kurdistan). Otto Harrassowitz Verlag.
- Wilmshurst, David (2000). The Ecclesiastical Organisation of the Church of the East, 1318–1913 (PDF). Peeters Publishers.
