= Kınık coal mine =

Coal mine in İzmir, Turkey

Kınık coal mine is an underground lignite mine in Turkey in Kınık District in İzmir Province, operated by Polyak Eynez Enerji Üretim Madencilik, which is owned by Fiba Group and Polat Madencilik. As late as 2024, according to local media, the company was still trying to get permission to build a coal-fired power plant. Polat and the related Polyak have been put on the Urgewald Global Coal Exit List.
