= Nexent Bank =

Bank in the Netherlands

Nexent Bank N.V.
- Industry: Finance
- Founded: 1994
- Headquarters: Amsterdam, Netherlands
- Key people: Hüsnü Özyeğin (Founder), Wilfred Nagel (Chair), Senol Aloglu (CEO)
- Owner: FIBA Group
- Number of employees: 900
- Website: http://www.nexentbank.com

Nexent Bank N.V. (Nexent Bank) is a Dutch-registered bank owned by the Turkish financial holding company FIBA Group. The bank is focused on corporate lending as well as on retail banking and operates in the Eurozone countries of the Netherlands, Germany, Malta, Romania, Switzerland, and Ukraine. The bank's strategy is to offer easy-to-use retail banking and SME products, as well as private banking. It also offers trade finance and corporate banking services.

== History ==
The banking group was first known as Finansbank (Holland) N.V. and was incorporated on 24 February 1994. The bank has had a full banking license in The Netherlands since 1994 and is supervised by the Dutch Central Bank, De Nederlandsche Bank.

In 2007, the bank was rebranded as Credit Europe Bank N.V., after Finansbank (the Turkish branch of Finansbank and the 5th biggest bank of Turkey) was sold to the National Bank of Greece. The brand 'Finansbank' was also included in the deal, leading to all branches (except the Turkish one) being renamed as Credit Europe Bank.

In June 2025, Credit Europe Bank N.V. was rebranded as Nexent Bank N.V.

== Operations ==
=== Corporate banking ===
Nexent Bank offers corporate banking services and products such as working capital and project finance loans, syndicated loans and factoring services. In addition, Nexent Bank has valuable experience in structured trade and commodity finance.

=== Bank Relations ===
The Nexent Bank relations team focuses on risk analysis, global trade services (clearing) and forfaiting. Bank Relations furthermore works closely with Corporate Banking and Treasury to facilitate their activities. Bank Relations maintains correspondent relationships with more than 300 banks worldwide. The aim is to stimulate trade finance opportunities, primarily in the bank's target markets. Knowledge exchange and cross-fertilization with subsidiaries contributed to overall performance.

=== Retail banking ===
The bank offers individuals and SME clients straight forward retail banking products in four European countries: the Netherlands, Germany, Malta and Romania.

=== Corporate Governance ===
Although Nexent Bank N.V. is not listed in the Netherlands, it voluntarily adheres to the principles and best practices of the Dutch Corporate Governance Code, also known as the “Code Tabaksblat”. Additionally, as banking organization, Nexent Bank N.V. also underwrites the Basel Committee rules on Enhancing Corporate Governance for Banking Organisations (the “Basel Rules”).

Nexent Bank N.V. applies a two tier board structure with a Supervisory Board and Managing Board.

The Supervisory Board of Nexent Bank N.V. consists of 5 members, as at 2025 these are; Willem Frederik (Wilfred) Nagel (chair), Ayşecan Özyeğin Oktay (vice-chair), Seha Ismen Ozgur, Ali Fuat Erbil and Johan Smessaert.

The members and respective functions of the managing board of Nexent Bank N.V. are; Şenol Aloğlu (CEO), Umut Bayoğlu and Batuhan Yalnız

== See also ==
- List of banks in the Netherlands
