= Koy Sinjaq District =

Koy Sinjaq District Sorani Kurdish: قەزای کۆیە Arabic: قضاء كويسنجق
- District
- Koya District
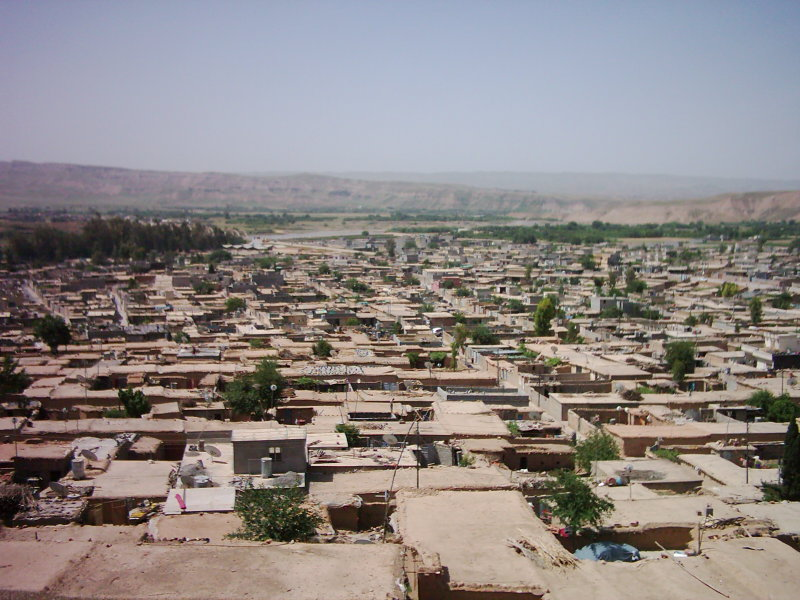
- This is an image of Taqtaq, a subdistrict of the Koy Sanjaq District.

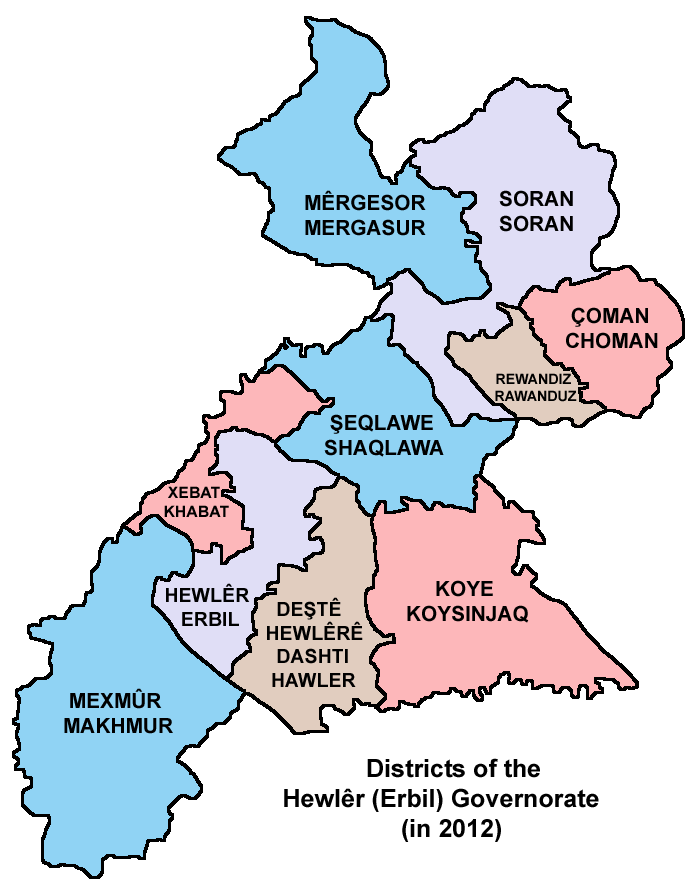
- Districts of the Erbil Governorate (in 2012)
- Country: Iraq
- Autonomous region: Kurdistan
- Governorate: Erbil Governorate

Area
  - District: 1,952 km^{2} (754 sq mi)

Population (2018)
  - District: 113,038
  - Density: 57.91/km^{2} (150.0/sq mi)
  - Urban: 86,473
  - Rural: 26,565
- Time zone: UTC+3 (AST)

Koy Sanjaq District (Kurdish: قەزای کۆیە, romanized: Qezay Koye; Arabic: قضاء كويسنجق) is a district in the Kurdistan Region, Iraq. The administrative centre of the district is Koya. The district encompasses four sub-districts: Shorash, Ashti, Siktan and Segrdkan. Ashti has 22 villages, Segrdkan has 11 villages, while Shorash and Siktan do not have detailed statistics. It is neighbored from the east and south by the Little Zab river, which separates it from the Governorate of Kirkuk and Suleimaniyah. It is bordered to the northeast by Mount Haibat Sultan and embraced by Mount Bawaji to the west. The district contains one university, called Koya University.

== Population Statistics ==
The population of Koy Sanjaq District was estimated 113,038 in 2018. However, another statistic from 2020 says the population is 95,186 people.
