= QNB Group =

Qatari bank

Qatar National Bank

- QNB Building in Doha, Qatar
- Type: Public bank
- Traded as: QE: QNBK
- ISIN: QA0006929895
- Industry: Banking
- Founded: June 6, 1964; 62 years ago as Qatar National Bank
- Headquarters: Doha, Qatar
- Number of locations: 900+ (2025)
- Area served: Worldwide
- Key people: Ali Bin Ahmed Al-Kuwari (Chairman); Abdulla Mubarak Al-Khalifa (GCEO)
- Products: Financial services
- Revenue: USD 4.75 billion (2025)
- Operating income: USD 12.25 billion (2025)
- Total assets: USD 380 billion (2025)
- Total equity: USD 34.14 billion (2025)
- Number of employees: 31 500 (2025)
- Parent: Qatar Investment Authority (50%)
- Website: www.qnb.com

Qatar National Bank Q.P.S.C. (QNB Group) (Arabic: بنك قطر الوطني) is a Qatari multinational commercial bank headquartered in Doha, Qatar. It was founded in 1964. The bank's ownership is evenly divided between the Qatar Investment Authority and members of the public.

As of March 2025, the QNB Group spanned over 28 countries across Asia, Africa, and Europe, and employed 31,000 people across 900 locations and 36 millions current accounts.

== History ==
QNB was founded on 6 June 1964 as the country's first domestically-owned commercial bank. It had 35 employees in its first year and was initially headquartered in a government-owned building in Qatar's capital city, Doha. The two currencies in circulation at the time were the Indian rupee and British pound. As Qatar's population continued increasing through the century, QNB started establishing branches in other parts of the country.

In 1974, the first branches outside of Doha were opened in Al Khor and Mesaieed. The bank installed its first ATMs in 1988 in its Doha branches, and introduced VISA cards for its clients the next year.

In 2013, QNB established a branch in Shanghai.

In 2013, QNB acquired Egypt's then-largest private-sector bank, National Société Générale Bank, from Société Générale, and rebranded it QNB Al Ahli. By 2015, it had established 76 branches in Qatar.

In 2016, QNB acquired Istanbul-based Finansbank from National Bank of Greece.

As of 2017, QNB also owned an 82.59 percent stake in Bank QNB Indonesia.

In 2024, QNB streamlined its brand identity in two of its main overseas markets, by phasing out the brands Al Ahli in Egypt and Finansbank in Turkey.

In September 2024, QNB participated in the Ooredoo Group's $549 million financing deal with Doha Bank and Masraf Al Rayan Bank to expand Ooredoo's data centers and AI business.

QNB was ranked third on Forbes Middle East's Top 100 Listed Companies 2025 list. It was also ranked fourth on Forbes's 30 Most Valuable Banks 2025 list. In 2025, they opened a branch in GIFT City, India.

In September 2025, the bank adopted JPMorgan's blockchain-based payment network, Kinexys. In October 2025, QNB announced it had refinanced its $1.5 billion unsecured syndicated term loan facility with a five-year maturity. During the same month, the bank greenlit the launch of its new digital initiative, ezbank in Egypt. This is a milestone for the development of the Egyptian financial sector and is the part of the new national strategy to improve financial inclusion and digital transformation.

As of February 2026, QNB was focusing on mobilising capital towards a more resilient, inclusive and low-carbon economy. The same was aligned with Qatar National Vision 2030 and QNB Group 2030 strategy. The key officials of QNB opined that they will do the same by participating in the financial and intermediation activities that drive economic diversification towards a knowledge-based economy. The bank will stay committed to its role as a financial intermediary and contribute to the national development activities.

In April 2026, QNB Egypt, a subsidiary of QNB, financed a sustainable aviation fuel (SAF) production facility in the country. The project is being launched with the goal of becoming the largest SAF initiative in Middle East and Africa.

In May 2026, QNB launched new digital banking services in Syria to accelerate digital payments in the country and reduce reliance on cash-based transactions. In the same month, the bank projected global headline inflation to rise to 4.4%. This was amidst an energy shock triggered by escalating military tensions in the Middle East, showing a sharp reversal from the pre-conflict trajectory.

== Operations ==
=== Employees ===
As of March 2026, the Qatar National bank had an employee count of 8,183, growing from 5,746 employees in 2023).

=== Employment of women ===
As of May 2025 women now account 48% of the workforce, and anti discriminatory policies have been introduced.

== International operations ==
The international expansion plans of the bank is focused on Middle East and Africa and on the high-growth economies of Southeast Asia. Across the international branches, in line with the international expansion strategy, there is significant growth in London, Paris, Singapore and Hong Kong.

=== Africa ===
- Egypt: (QNB Egypt)
- Togo: (Ecobank Group), 20% shareholding
- Tunisia: (QNB Tunisia)

=== Asia ===
- Indonesia: (QNB Indonesia)
- Iraq: (Mansour Bank), 52,4% shareholding
- Jordan: (Housing Bank for Trade and Finance), 28.3% shareholding
- Syria: (QNB Syria)
- Oman: (QNB Oman)
- Turkey: (QNB Turkey)
- United Arab Emirates: (Commercial Bank International), 40% shareholding

== Awards ==
- Overall Best Bank in Sustainable Finance in the Middle East, at the annual Global Sustainable Financial Awards.
- In February 2026, the group also won the Best Bank Awards for Sustainability Bonds in the Middle East.
- QNB was also awarded the Best Bank for Green Bonds in the Middle East, and the Best Bank Award for Social Bonds, all awarded at the annual Global Sustainable Financial Awards.
- QNB was also awarded the Best Bank for Sustainable Finance in Qatar.
- In 2025, in the Euromoney Private Banking Awards ceremony, QNB was awarded the best private bank award.

== See also ==
- List of largest banks
