= Özyeğin University =

Private university in İstanbul, Turkey

- Özyeğin University
- Type: Private (Non-profit)
- Established: May 18, 2007; 19 years ago
- Founders: Hüsnü Özyeğin
- Rector: Barış Tan
- Location: Istanbul, Turkey; 41°01′57.8″N 29°15′29.9″E
- Campus: Çekmeköy, Istanbul
- Language: Mainly English, and Turkish
- Website: ozyegin.edu.tr

University rankings

Regional – Overall
- QS Emerging Europe and Central Asia: 200 (2022)

Özyeğin University is a private non-profit university located in Istanbul, Turkey.

== History ==
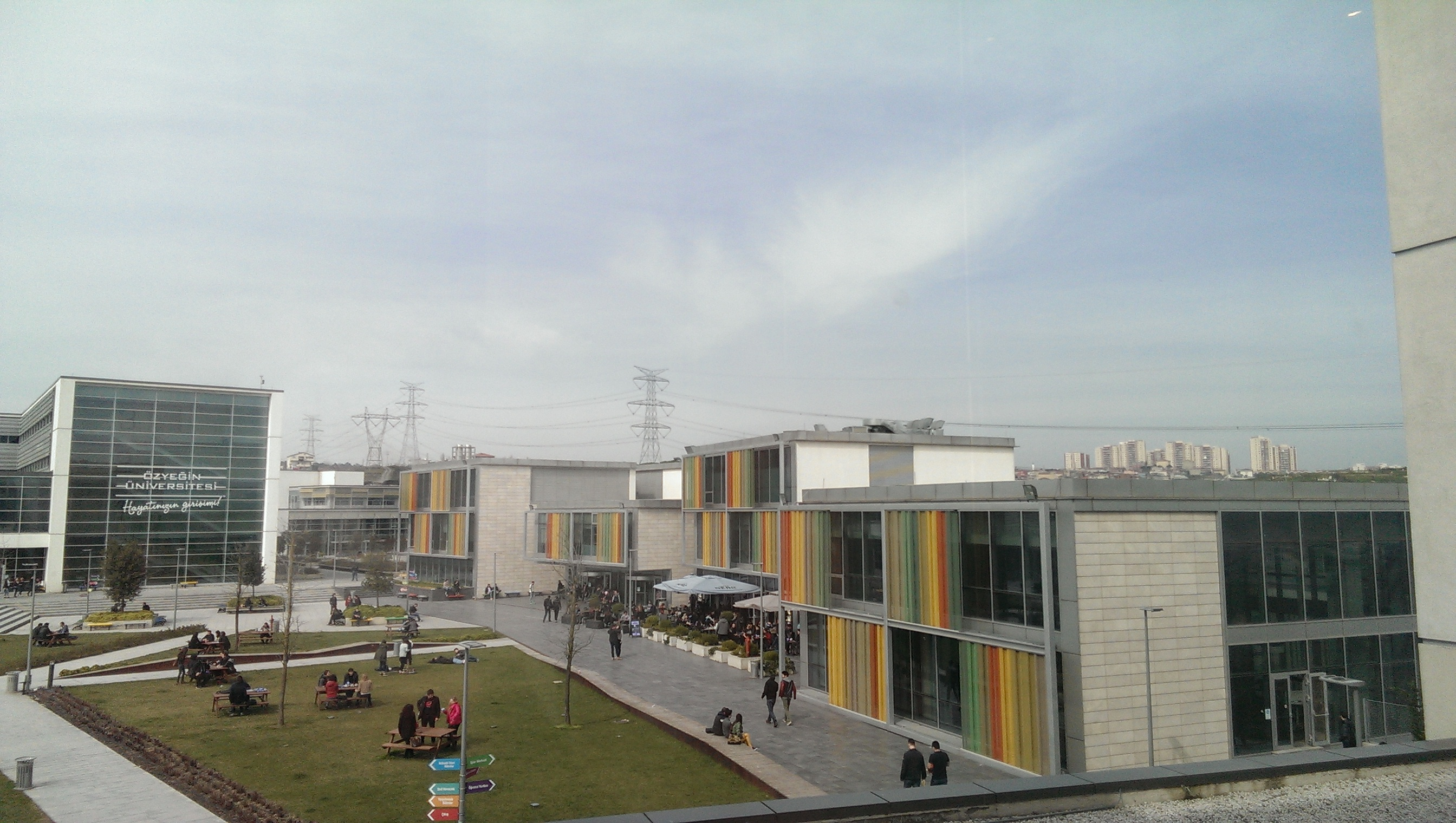
Özyeğin University, taken from Engineering faculty building

Established in 2007 by the Hüsnü M. Özyeğin Foundation, Özyeğin University is an entrepreneurial research university. It offers 25 bachelor’s, 36 master’s, and 10 doctoral programs across 7 faculties and 3 graduate schools.

== Campus ==
Altunizade Campus is the university's first campus, which was opened in June 2008. The university launched the main new campus in Çekmeköy, Istanbul. Later the building in Altunizade was evacuated and all departments moved to the Çekmeköy Campus in May 2013.

== Organization and structure ==
Faculties

- Faculty of Business
- Faculty of Engineering
- Faculty of Social Sciences
- Faculty of Aviation and Aeronautical Sciences
- Faculty of Law
- Faculty of Architecture and Design
- Faculty of Applied Sciences

Graduate Schools

- Graduate School of Engineering and Science
- Graduate School of Business
- Graduate School of Social Science

Schools

- School of Languages (ScOLa)

== Notable alumni ==
- İrem Karamete (born 1993), Olympic fencer
- Tutya Yılmaz (born 1999), Olympic gymnast

== See also ==
- List of universities in Turkey
- Hüsnü Özyeğin
- Murat Özyeğin
