= QNB Turkey =

Turkish bank

QNB Bank A.Ş.

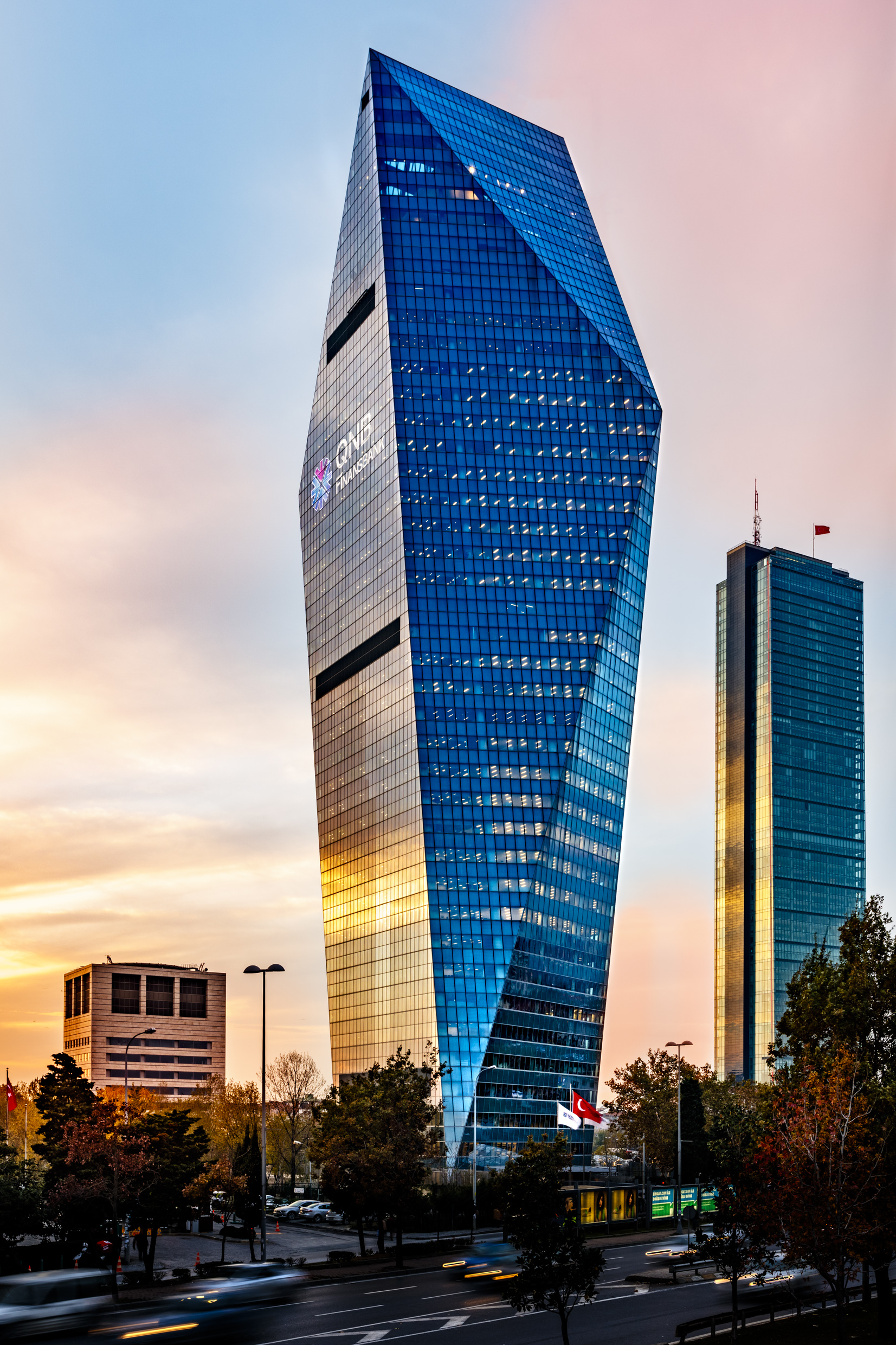
- QNB Tower in Levent, Istanbul
- Type: Subsidiary
- Traded as: BİST: QNBTR
- Industry: Banking
- Predecessor: Finansbank A.Ş. (1987–2016); QNB Finansbank A.Ş. (2016–2024)
- Founded: September 23, 1987; 38 years ago
- Founder: Hüsnü Özyeğin
- Headquarters: Şişli, Istanbul, Turkey
- Area served: Turkey
- Key people: Ömür Tan (CEO)
- Number of employees: 14,255 (2023)
- Parent: QNB Group
- Website: qnb.com.tr

QNB Bank A.Ş. (formerly known as Finansbank) is a Turkish bank with headquarters in Istanbul. It was established by Turkish financier Hüsnü Özyeğin in 1987 and for a period was the Turkish bank with the largest network of foreign branches. Its Turkish operations were purchased by National Bank of Greece (NBG) in 2006, then by QNB Group in 2016, which first rebranded it QNB Finansbank then phased out the Finansbank brand in 2024. Its former international operations were rebranded in 2007 as Nexent Bank.

== History ==
Finansbank logo

On March 18, 2014, Turkish daily Hürriyet reported the purchase by National Bank of Greece (NBG) of Soyak Kristal Kule (Soyak Crystal Tower), a 40-floor, 60,000 square-meter office tower in Levent, one of the main business districts in Istanbul. The property was purchased for a reported price of $303M (US) from Koru Property Investments, a subsidiary of Soyak Group in Turkey. Hürriyet reported that NBG intended to use the newly constructed tower as Finansbank's headquarters. The property includes an adjoining 12-floor structure of 30,000 square-meters which is topped by a helipad. The main building's Turkish name, Kristal Kule (Crystal Tower) refers to the glass-sheathed structure's asymmetric, faceted, sloping silhouette. The project used a performance-based building design (PBBD). The principal architects were Pei Cobb Freed & Partners. The design, planning, engineering, and consulting firm, Arup, provided project management services for the project.

As of September 30, 2015, Finansbank operated with 647 branches and 13,000 employees. In the third quarter of 2015, Finansbank's profit was 673 million TL; its total loans rose to 57 billion 194 million TL; total assets rose to 90 billion, 410 million TL; customer deposit portfolio rose to 47 billion, 306 million TL; and total equities reached 8 billion 937 million TL.

In late 2015, the National Bank of Greece announced its decision to sell Finansbank to Qatari QNB Group in a deal worth 2.7 billion Euros. On June 15, 2016, the acquisition of Finansbank by the QNB Group was completed.

On October 14, 2024, the bank changed its legal name to QNB Bank A.Ş. and rebranded as QNB, marking the end of the Finansbank brand.

== See also ==
- List of banks in Turkey
