= Hanna Zora =

Chaldean Catholic archbishop

- (Arch)Eparch of Mar Addai of Toronto
- Native name: هانا زورا
- Church: Chaldean Catholic Church
- Diocese: Eparchy of Mar Addai of Toronto
- In office: 10 June 2011 – 3 May 2014
- Predecessor: Eparchy erected
- Successor: Emanuel Hana Shaleta
- Previous post: Archeparch of Ahvaz (1974-2011)

Orders
- Ordination: 10 June 1962
- Consecration: 27 October 1974 by Youhannan Semaan Issayi

Personal details
- Born: 15 March 1939 Batnaya, Hashemite Kingdom of Iraq
- Died: 2 October 2016 (aged 77)

Hanna Zora (15 March 1939, Batnaia, Tel Keppe, Iraq – 2 October 2016) was a Chaldean Catholic archbishop. He died in Tbilisi.

Ordained to the priesthood in 1962, Zora served as archbishop of Ahvaz of the Chaldeans, Iran, from 1974 to 2011. From then on, he served as archbishop of Mar Addai of Toronto of the Chaldeans from 2011 to 2014. He was a participant in the electoral Synod of Bishops of the Chaldean Catholic Church in January 2013, which elected the new Patriarch Louis Raphaël I Sako. In 1998, he purchased land and began raising funds to build the Good Shepherd Cathedral in Toronto. In March 2000 the Cathedral was built and inaugurated.
