= Seminary of Mar Abba the Great =

Religious campus

Coordinates: 32°46′21″N 116°56′8″W

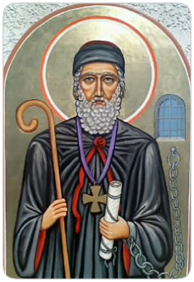
- Icon of Mar Abba the Great, the seminary's patron saint
- Type: Private Chaldean Catholic Seminary
- Established: 2008
- Affiliations: Eparchy of St. Peter The Apostle
- Rector: Andrew Younan
- Location: El Cajon, United States
- Website: www.stpeterdiocese.org/marabbaseminary

The Seminary of Mar Abba the Great is a Chaldean Catholic seminary located in El Cajon, California. The seminary is the first and only Chaldean Catholic seminary outside of Iraq.

The seminary is part of the Eparchy of St. Peter the Apostle. This diocese encompasses 19 of the westernmost states of the United States. The seminary was consecrated by Mar Sarhad Yawsip Jammo on July 25, 2008. Fr. Andrew Younan was appointed as the seminary's first rector. Mar Bawai Soro was assigned to the post of spiritual director for those discerning the priesthood. The seminary proper has dorms for as many as 10 men, and there is another building on the land which is the Institute of Mar Abba the Great which is home to a chapel, library, and a classroom.

== Patron saint: Mar Abba the Great ==
The seminary's patron saint, for whom the seminary was named, was a convert from Zoroastrianism. The man who would later become the patriarch of the Church of the East was the secretary of the governor of a Persian province when he met a Christian during one of his journeys. He was so impressed by the Christian's simplicity and humility that he began to talk to him and eventually became a Christian himself. He soon became a monk and made a pilgrimage to visit much of the Western Christian world, including Jerusalem, Egypt, Greece and Constantinople, with his friend Toma, where they were received with great enthusiasm as holy men and fine scholars.

Mar Abba became patriarch in 540, a time of great interior and exterior turmoil in the church, but despite the disasters before him, he faced his patriarchate with great brilliance and nobility. He visited every diocese and dealt fairly with any divisions, he revived both monasticism and Christian scholarship, creating educational systems for the simple faithful as well as theological universities, and he returned the church, through his policies and his personal example, to its original purity and simplicity, all in the course of a 12-year patriarchate, during most of which he was either in prison or in exile for defying the Zoroastrian authorities. At his synod in 544, Mar Abba solidified the internal reorganization of the Church of the East and reached out enthusiastically for unity with the Western Church.

After his death in February 552, the faithful carried his casket from his simple home across the Tigris to the monastery of Mar Pithyon.

== See also ==
- Eparchy of St. Peter The Apostle
- Mar Sarhad Yawsip Jammo
