= Sarhad Yawsip Jammo =

Iraqi-born American prelate (1941–2025)

The Most Reverend Mar Sarhad Yawsip Jammo
- Eparch Emeritus of the Eparchy of St. Peter the Apostle
- Church: Chaldean Catholic Church
- Diocese: Chaldean Catholic Eparchy of Saint Peter the Apostle of San Diego
- Installed: 25 July 2002
- Retired: 7 May 2016
- Predecessor: First Eparch
- Successor: Emanuel Hana Shaleta

Orders
- Ordination: 19 December 1964
- Consecration: 25 July 2002 by Raphael I Bidawid, Emmanuel III Delly and Ibrahim Namo Ibrahim

Personal details
- Born: 14 March 1941 Baghdad, Iraq
- Died: 4 February 2025 (aged 83) San Diego, California, U.S.

Styles of Sarhad Yawsip Jammo
- Reference style: His Grace; The Most Reverend
- Spoken style: His Grace
- Religious style: Eparch

Sarhad Yawsip Hermiz Jammo (14 March 1941 – 4 February 2025) was an Iraqi-born American prelate of the Chaldean Catholic Church who presided over the Chaldean Catholic Eparchy of Saint Peter the Apostle of San Diego in the United States. He had been the bishop of this diocese since its inception on 25 July 2002. His bishopric currently sits at St. Peter's Chaldean Catholic Cathedral in El Cajon, California.

Mar Sarhad Jammo was born in Baghdad and ordained a priest on 19 December 1964. Following 38 years as a priest, he was elevated to the episcopate by the then Patriarch of Babylon of the Chaldeans, Mar Raphael I Bidawid. Upon his installment, his first post was to serve as bishop of the newly created eparchy, St. Peter the Apostle, which spans across nineteen states of the western United States. He retired on 7 May 2016.

== Early life and education ==
Born to an Assyrian family from Baghdad, he attended the Chaldean Patriarchal Seminary in Mosul for formation and left to Rome at the age of 17. He attended the Pontifical Urbaniana University, where he earned a master's degree in both philosophy and theology. He then pursued doctoral studies at the Pontifical Oriental Institute, where he earned a Doctor of Philosophy in Eastern Ecclesiastical Studies. His dissertation was titled, "The Structure of the Chaldean Mass". Bishop Jammo conducted instructional work at several prestigious universities. He taught at the Pontifical Oriental Institute in Rome, the University of Notre Dame, and the Catholic University of America in Washington, D.C.

== Pastoral work ==
After finishing his studies in Rome, Jammo was appointed pastor of St. John the Baptist Parish in Baghdad, where he would serve from 1969 to 1974. At which time, he became the rector at the Chaldean Patriarchial Seminary in Mosul. In 1977, he was made associate pastor of Mother of God parish in Southfield, Michigan, where he would serve with Mar George Garmo. In 1983, he was appointed pastor of St. Joseph's Church in Troy, Michigan, in which capacity he would serve until his elevation to the episcopacy.

In 2002, Pope John Paul II created a second diocese for the Chaldean Catholic Church in the United States. The new diocese would divide the country between the east and west. Mar Sarhad Jammo would be given an apostolic seat to preside over the Eparchy of St. Peter the Apostle covering the western United States. Bishop Jammo has championed ecclesiastical renewal and reconciliation. In 2006, the Chaldean Catholic Church received Vatican approval on a reform of the Liturgy of Addai and Mari. The St. Peter Diocese has been the first to implement the reformed mass showing Bishop Jammo's passion and zeal for liturgical renewal.

== Degrees and publications ==
- Master's in Philosophy, Pontifical Urbaniana University
- Master's in Theology, Pontifical Urbaniana University
- Doctorate in Eastern Ecclesiastical Studies, Pontifical Oriental Institute
- Doctoral Dissertation, "The Structure of the Chaldean Mass"
- Musical Play, "Between the Tigris and the Euphrates"
- Chaldean Patriarchial Liturgical Committee, "Presentation of the Reformed Chaldean Missal"

Bishop Jammo is an established author and historian of the Chaldean Catholic history, liturgy, and language. The Bishop has authored the following books/publications: "Introductory Chaldean," "Ancient and Modern Chaldean History," "The Chaldean Liturgy: At the Gate of God", "Chaldean Grammar", "Emmanuel", "Chosen to Rescue: Chaldean Exegis of the Old Testament (Old Pillars)", "Journeying to Emmaus: A Chaldean Catechism for First Communion", and "L'Office du soir chaldéen au temps de Gabriel Qatraya" in L'Orient Syrien 12 (1967) 187–210 on the writings of Gabriel of Qatar.

== On Assyrian identity ==
At a 1996 lecture on "Chaldeans in the Third Millennium", Jammo stated, "So often I had to clarify it because I think it's not understood, never understood, how much I write, and educate people. When I say "Chaldean,"—our forefathers when they gave us the name "Chaldean," did not mean, did not mean, did not mean that they are from people of Babylon. No! No! No! Don't be dumps, all of us, including me, to think that my forefathers didn't understand that living in Tel Keppe and Alqosh, they didn't know that they were Assyrians? Our forefathers understood. Our forefathers understood. When they said "Chaldeans," how someone living Tel Keppe didn't know that Nineveh was in front of his eyes, that he is not from Babylon. It's not meant in that way. Our forefathers searched for a comprehensive title, not only for one time or one period, but for the entirety of the people—all of it."

== Death ==
Jammo died in San Diego, California, on 4 February 2025, at the age of 83.

== See also ==
- Catholic Church hierarchy
- Catholic Church in the United States
- Historical list of the Catholic bishops of the United States
- List of Catholic bishops of the United States
- Lists of patriarchs, archbishops, and bishops

== Episcopal succession ==
Catholic Church titles
Preceded by First Eparch	Eparch of St. Peter the Apostle of San Diego; 2002–2016	Succeeded by Emanuel Hana Shaleta
