= Emanuel Hana Shaleta =

Chaldean Catholic prelate (born 1956)

His Grace, The Most Reverend Emanuel Hana Shaleta
- Eparch Emeritus of San Diego
- Church: Chaldean Catholic
- Diocese: Eparchy of Saint Peter the Apostle of San Diego
- Appointed: August 9, 2017
- Installed: August 29, 2017
- Retired: March 10, 2026
- Predecessor: Sarhad Yawsip Jammo
- Previous post: Eparch of Toronto (2015‍–‍2017)

Orders
- Ordination: May 31, 1984 by John Paul II
- Consecration: February 6, 2015 by Louis Raphaël I Sako, Shlemon Warduni, and Francis Y. Kalabat

Personal details
- Born: November 11, 1956 (age 69) Fishkhabour-Zakho, Iraq
- Motto: Let us go to the House of the Lord

Styles of Emanuel Hana Shaleta
- Reference style: His Grace; The Most Reverend
- Spoken style: His Grace
- Religious style: Eparch

Emanuel Hana Shaleta (born November 11, 1956) is a Chaldean Catholic prelate who served as the Eparch of Saint Peter the Apostle of San Diego from 2017 to 2026.

== Biography ==
Shaleta was born in the village of Fishkhabour in Northern Iraq.

On May 31, 1984, Shaleta was ordained to the priesthood. Pope Francis appointed Shaleta eparch for the Chaldean Catholic Eparchy of Saint Peter the Apostle of San Diego on August 9, 2017. On August 29, 2017, Shaleta was installed as eparch.

In January 2026, Shaleta submitted his resignation in response to a canonical investigation ordered by the Vatican. He is accused of embezzlement and improper behavior, including visits to Tijuana linked to prostitution.

On March 5, 2026, Shaleta was arrested at San Diego International Airport as he tried to leave the United States. He was charged with felony counts of embezzlement and money laundering. According to a report published by the Catholic news organization The Pillar, he is possibly the first sitting diocesan Catholic bishop arrested for felony financial crimes in the US. Shaleta is expected to face trial in autumn 2026.

In February 2026, Pope Leo XIV accepted Shaleta's resignation as the bishop of the eparchy, and this was made public on March 10 when he appointed an apostolic administrator for the eparchy.

== See also ==
- Catholic Church in the United States
- Hierarchy of the Catholic Church
- Historical list of the Catholic bishops of the United States
- List of Catholic bishops in the United States
- Lists of popes, patriarchs, primates, archbishops, and bishops

Catholic Church titles
Preceded by Hanna Zora	Eparch of Chaldean Catholic Eparchy of Mar Addai of Toronto; 2015‍–‍2017	Succeeded by Bawai Soro
Preceded by Sarhad Yawsip Jammo	Eparch of the Chaldean Catholic Eparchy of Saint Peter the Apostle of San Diego; 2017‍–‍2026	Succeeded by Vacant
