= St. Michael Chaldean Catholic Church =

St. Michael's Chaldean Catholic Church
- Saint Michael's Chaldean Catholic Church of the Eparchy of Saint Peter the Apostle
- St. Michael's Chaldean Catholic Church
- 32°47′13.88″N 116°57′08.32″W
- Location: 799 E Washington Ave. El Cajon, California
- Address: 799 E Washington Ave #5327, El Cajon, CA 92020
- Country: United States
- Language: East Syriac Arabic English
- Denomination: Chaldean Catholic Church
- Sui iuris church: Chaldean Catholic Church

History
- Founded: 2000
- Founder: Father Sabri A. Iskander
- Dedication: Saint Michael in the Catholic Church
- Dedicated: Saint Michael in the Catholic Church

Administration
- Diocese: Eparchy of St. Peter the Apostle

Clergy
- Bishop: sede vacante
- Vicar: Fr. Ray Sarkees (Parochial Vicar) Fr. Tariq Eissa (Parochial Vicar)
- Priest: Fr. Simon Esshaki (Pastor)
- Pastor: Fr. Simon Esshaki (Pastor)

St. Michael's Chaldean Catholic Church is a Chaldean Catholic church located in El Cajon, California, United States. It is a church part of the Eparchy of St. Peter the Apostle. The church plays a central role in the lives of Iraqi immigrants and refugees, providing them with a sense of community, solace, and a place to worship. This church, among other Chaldean Churches in the area, struggle to accommodate the increasing number of worshippers, with crowded services being a common occurrence.

== Christian solidarity rally ==
St. Michael's was the starting point for a rally that took place on August 21, 2014. The rally aimed to raise awareness about the challenges faced by Christians in Iraq. The event brought together a large number of participants at Centennial Plaza, who organized a peace march through the streets of El Cajon. The primary objective of the rally was to draw attention to the urgent need for assistance and justice for Iraqi Christians in the midst of the humanitarian crisis in Iraq. Attendees emphasized the importance of providing a secure refuge for those affected and called for international support to address the situation and protect the rights of religious minorities.

== See also ==
- Eparchy of St. Peter the Apostle
