= Louis Raphaël I Sako =

Head of the Chaldean Catholic Church from 2013 to 2026

His Eminence Mar Louis Raphaël I Sako
- Cardinal, Patriarch Emeritus of the Chaldean Catholic Patriarchate of Baghdad
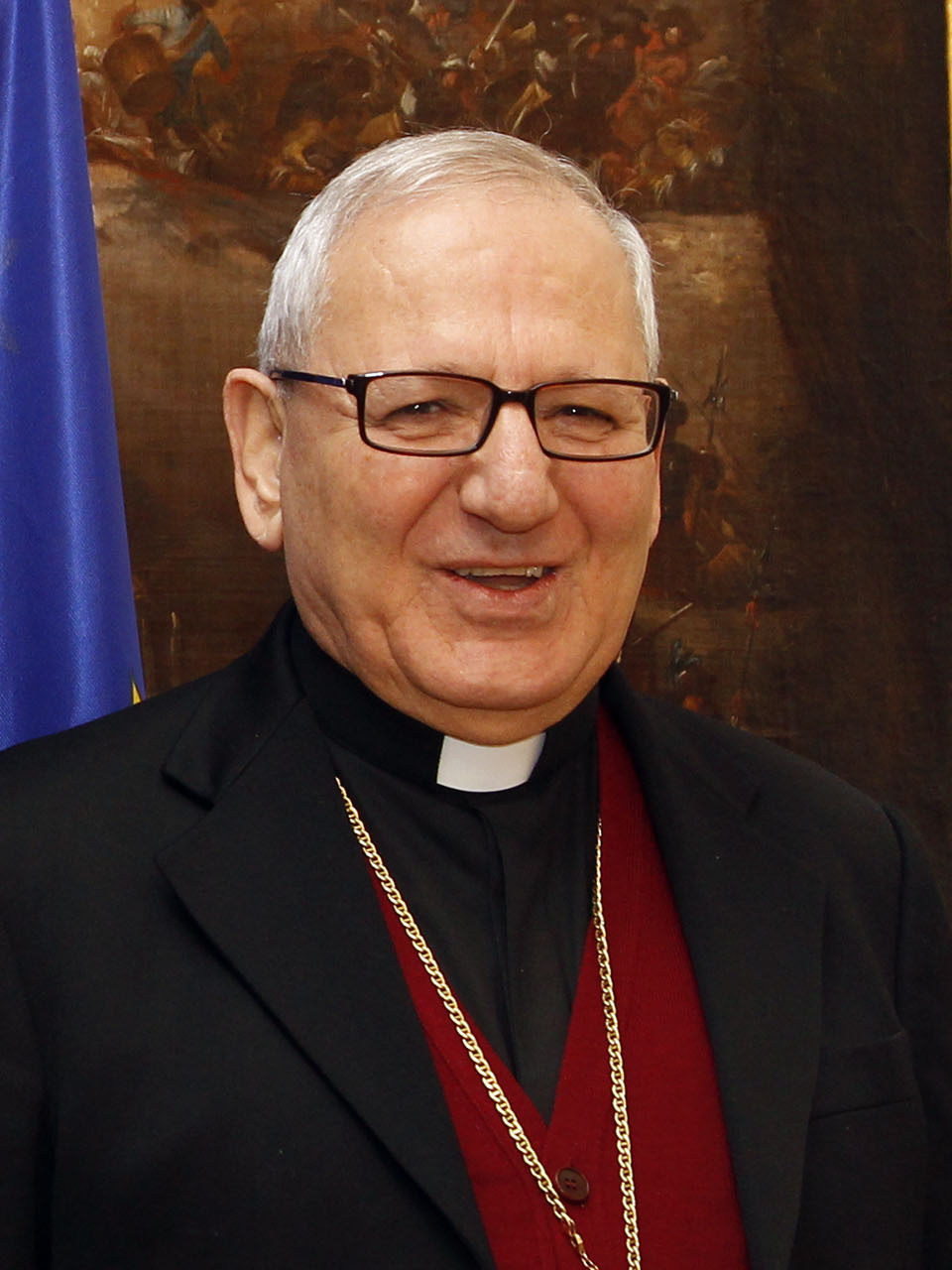
- Sako in 2015
- Native name: لويس روفائيل ساكو
- Church: Chaldean Catholic Church
- See: Patriachate of Baghdad
- Elected: 31 January 2013
- Retired: 10 March 2026
- Predecessor: Emmanuel III Delly
- Successor: Paul III Nona
- Previous posts: Archbishop of Kerkūk (2002‍–‍2013); Apostolic Administrator of Sulaimaniya (2010‍–‍2013); Chaldean Archbishop of Baghdad (2013‍–‍2026)

Orders
- Ordination: 1 June 1974
- Consecration: 14 November 2003 by André Sana
- Created cardinal: 28 June 2018 by Pope Francis
- Rank: Patriarch (Cardinal-Bishop)

Personal details
- Born: Louis Sako; 4 July 1948 (age 78) Zakho, Kingdom of Iraq
- Residence: Baghdad
- Education: Pontifical Oriental Institute; The Sorbonne
- Motto: Unity Authenticity Renewal
- Signature: Louis Raphaël I Sako's signature

- Coat of arms: Louis Raphaël I Sako's coat of arms

Ordination history
History
Episcopal consecration
- Principal consecrator: André Sana
- Co-consecrators: Shlemon Warduni, Paulos Faraj Rahho
Cardinalate
- Elevated by: Pope Francis
Episcopal succession
Bishops consecrated by Louis Raphaël I Sako as principal consecrator
- Yousif Thomas Mirkis: 2014
- Habib Hormiz Jajou Al Nawfali: 2014
- Saad Hanna Sirop: 2014
- Frank Yohana Kalabat: 2014
- Emanuel Hana Shaleta: 2015
- Basel Salim Yaldo: 2015
- Najib Mikhael Moussa: 2019
- Robert Saeed Jarjis: 2019
- Felix Dawood Al Shabi: 2020
- Thabet Habib Yousif Al Mekko: 2021
- Azad Sabri Shaba: 2022
- Sabri Anar: 2023
- Imad Khoshaba Gargees: 2023

Louis Raphaël I Sako (Arabic: لويس روفائيل ساكو; born 4 July 1948) is a Chaldean Catholic prelate who served as Patriarch of Baghdad from 2013 to 2026. Pope Francis made him a cardinal in 2018.

== Biography ==
=== Early life ===
Sako was born in the city of Zakho, Iraq, on 4 July 1948. He completed his early studies in Mosul and then attended the Dominican-run Saint Jean’s Seminary there. He was ordained a priest on 1 June 1974 and filled his first pastoral assignment at the Cathedral of Mosul until 1979. He then earned a doctorate in Eastern patrology at the Pontifical Oriental Institute. When denied a license to teach because he was only qualified for religious instruction, he earned a second doctorate in history from the Sorbonne in Paris. With this he secured his teaching license and was able to provide religious instruction. From 1997 to 2002 he was rector of the Patriarchal Seminary in Baghdad. He then returned to Mosul and guided the parish of Perpetual Help for a year.

Sako speaks Neo-Aramaic, German, French, English, Italian, Kurdish and Arabic.

=== Archeparch ===
A synod of the bishops of the Chaldean Catholic Church meeting in Baghdad elected Sako Archeparch of Kirkuk on 24 October 2002. Pope John Paul II gave his assent on 27 September 2003. He received his episcopal consecration on 14 November 2003 from his predecessor in Kirkuk, André Sana.

In August 2009, and at the beginning of Ramadan, Sako organized an appeal for national peace, reconciliation and end to violence on the part of more than fifty religious leaders in Kirkuk. He called it "a gesture of closeness to our Muslim brothers. We are all brothers, sons of the same God we must respect and cooperate for the good of the people and our country." The participants included representatives of Ali Sistani and Muqtada al Sadr.

=== Patriarch ===
The Synod of Bishops of the Chaldean Catholic Church, convoked in Rome on 28 January 2013, elected Sako to succeed Emmanuel III Delly as Patriarch of Babylon. He chose Louis Raphael I as his regnal name. Pope Benedict XVI gave his assent to the election on 1 February and granted him ecclesiastica communio (ecclesiastical communion) as required by the canon law for the Eastern Catholic Churches in recognition of their unity with the wider Catholic church.

That same year, Iraq's President Jalal Talabani issued a decree recognizing Sako as Patriarch of the Chaldean Church.

In July 2014 Sako led a wave of condemnation for the Sunni Islamists who demanded Christians either convert, submit to their radical rule and pay a religious levy or face death by the sword. In September 2014 Sako said “The U.S. is indirectly responsible for what is going on in Iraq as it said it would ensure democracy and the well-being of the people, but 10 years have passed and on the contrary we have gone backward." He was responding to a question following remarks attributed to him in the local daily Ad-Diyar in which he accused the U.S. of supporting ISIS. Sako had also criticized Muslim countries for lack of support: "Our Muslim neighbours did not help us." He urged Muslim preachers to issue a religious ruling against the killing of all innocent people and said that "Issuing a fatwa preventing Muslims from killing fellow Muslims is not enough."

In 2014, Sako ordered ten priests who had fled Iraq to return there by 22 October; he suspended them when they failed to comply. The priests, all living in the United States, some for as long as twenty years, appealed to Pope Francis for relief from the order. In January 2015, Pope Francis granted them permission to remain in the United States. Sako later renewed his order despite the pope's decision.

In 2015, Sako proposed a "merger" or reunion of his own Chaldean Catholic Church with the Ancient Church of the East and the Assyrian Church of the East to create one united "Church of the East" with a single patriarch in union with the pope. His proposal would have required both his own resignation and that of Mar Addai II, followed by a joint synod of the bishops of all three churches to elect a new patriarch for the reunited Church of the East. (The patriarchate of the Assyrian Church of the East was vacant at the time, following the death of Mar Dinkha IV.) He wrote that "Unity does not mean uniformity, nor the melting of our own church identity into one style, but it maintains unity in diversity and we remain one apostolic universal church, the Oriental Church, that maintains its independence of administration, laws and liturgies, traditions and support." The Assyrian Church of the East respectfully declined this proposal citing "ecclesiological divergences still remaining" and proceeded with its election of a new patriarch.

On 14 November 2015, the Synod of Bishops announced that Pope Francis had named Sako as one of his three appointments to that body's council.

Pope Leo XIV's acceptance of Sako's resignation as patriarch was publicly announced on 10 March 2026. Sako released a letter the same day in which he said that he had considered retiring two years prior at 75 years old but Pope Francis had encouraged him to remain patriarch. In the letter, Sako said he had retired of his own volition, without being pressured.

=== Cardinal ===
Pope Francis made Sako a cardinal in a consistory on 28 June 2018. Later that year, Pope Francis named him one of the four cardinals to preside over sessions of the Synod of Bishops on Youth in October. On 6 October 2018 Sako was named a member of the Congregation for the Oriental Churches, on 22 February 2019 a member of the Pontifical Council for Interreligious Dialogue, and on 29 September 2021 a member of the Congregation for Catholic Education. On 4 January 2022, Pope Francis made him a member of the Council for the Economy.

Sako was a cardinal elector in the 2025 papal conclave that elected Pope Leo XIV. Patriarch Sako was also the first Chaldean Catholic patriarch ever to participate in a papal conclave. (Note: Patriarch Sako is the second Chaldean Catholic patriarch to be made cardinal, the first being his predecessor Emmanuel III Delly who was created cardinal-patriarch in 2007. Cardinal Delly however had already turned 80 at the time he was made cardinal and thus was never a cardinal elector.) Sako opted not to wear the shash, the traditional headgear of East Syriac Christian bishops, and wore only his scarlet zucchetto.

==== Controversies as cardinal ====
On 15 July 2023, Iraq's president, Abdul Latif Rashid, announced the revocation of the government's 2013 decree recognizing Sako as patriarch. In response that same day, Sako announced he was leaving Baghdad to take up residence in Iraqi Kurdistan and would soon retire. He called the revocation "unprecedented in the history of Iraq".

Rashid said his action "does not affect the religious or legal status of patriarch Sako" and said it was based on the fact that Sako's office is not recognized by the Iraqi Constitution; Sako viewed as an extension of the government's ongoing "deliberate and humiliating campaign" against him and its wider failure to protect Iraqi Christians. Rashid's predecessor, Jalal Talabani, had authorized Sako as the official representative of Chaldean Catholics in Iraq with a special decree. As of 2023, Rashid had recently rejected requests from the patriarchs of the Assyrian Church and the Old Assyrian Church for comparable decrees. .

Sako had also been embroiled in a war of words with a Shia lawmaker and militia leader, Rayan al-Kildani. Both accused each other of exploiting their influence to illegally seize Christian-owned properties. Al-Kildani is the leader of the Babylon Movement, whose militia fought ISIS within the state-linked Popular Mobilization Forces, a network of largely pro-Iran paramilitaries. Al-Kildani also forged strong alliances with powerful Tehran-allied Shiite militias. Sako criticized the Babylon Movement as falsely Christian, alleging that most of its members and supporters are Shia Muslims.

Sako has accused Erbil Archbishop Bashar Warda of collaborating and conspiring with al-Kildani in an effort to subvert his authority and push for his resignation as head of the Chaldean Church. Warda is also criticized for not supporting Sako's efforts to counter the Babylon Movement's seizure of Christian assets. This has led to accusations that Warda prioritizes benefits from al-Kildani's support over protecting church interests. Sako has referred to Warda as the "Godfather" of the Babylon Movement. On 7 August 2023, Sako said that the government's revocation of the recognition decree was "a humiliation for the Church." He also alleged that the government wished to "put their hands on the properties of the Church and administer them separately from the ecclesiastical authorities". In April 2024, after nine months of exile, Sako returned to Baghdad with the assistance of Iraqi Prime Minister Mohammed Shia' al-Sudani.

On 28 August 2024, Sako demanded a public apology from five Chaldean bishops, based on perceived disunity in the Church, including absence from a mandatory July episcopal synod. He set a deadline of September 5 for an apology. The five bishops, led by Warda, also withdrew from an August spiritual retreat and pulled their students from the local Chaldean seminary. The bishops refused to apologize, citing dissatisfaction with Sako's leadership style and unilateral decision-making. As a result, Sako suspended them and asked Pope Francis to impose canonical penalties, including excommunication. The actions of Warda and the other bishops have been described by the patriarchate as a "dangerous precedent" that goes against their episcopal vows. The 17 bishops who attended the July 2024 synod issued a communiqué calling for "appropriate legal measures" against the "clear violations" committed by the boycotting group of Warda.

Sako has alleged that Warda is seeking to seize the patriarchate by way of the ongoing conflict. In the spring of 2025, this perception led Sako to backtrack on his initial plans to retire at 75, driven by a determination to thwart Warda's power grab. His resignation was later accepted in March 2026, following his controversial support of an American Chaldean bishop facing embezzlement charges. Chaldean bishops met to select Sako's successor in April 2026.

== Honours ==
- Pax Christi International Peace Award, 2010

== See also ==
- Cardinals created by Francis

== Notes ==
Catholic Church titles
Preceded by André Sana	Chaldean Catholic Archbishop of Kirkuk; 2003–2013	Succeeded by Yousif Thomas Mirkis
Preceded by Emmanuel III Delly	Patriarch of Babylon of the Chaldeans; 2013–2026	Succeeded by Paul III Nona
