= Chaldean Catholic Eparchy of Saint Peter the Apostle of San Diego =

Eastern Catholic ecclesiastical jurisdiction in the Western United States

Chaldean Catholic Eparchy of Saint Peter The Apostle Eparchia Sancti Petri Apostoli urbis Sancti Didaci Chaldaeorum

Catholic
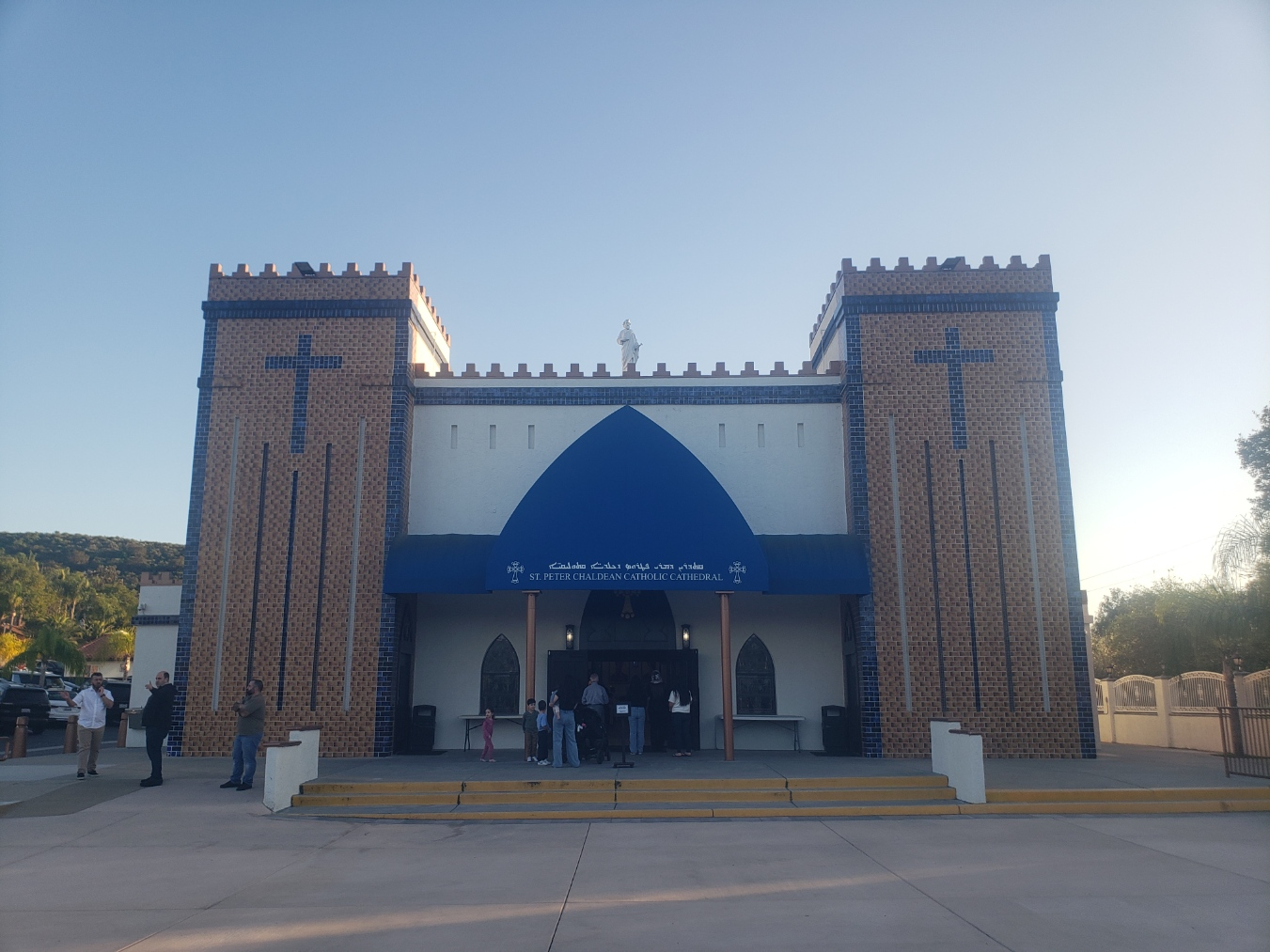
- St. Peter Chaldean Catholic Cathedral

- Logo

Location
- Country: United States
- Territory: Western U.S.
- Episcopal conference: United States Conference of Catholic Bishops
- Ecclesiastical region: Region XV (Eastern Rites)
- Ecclesiastical province: Eastern Catholic Eparchies Immediately Subject to the Holy See
- Deaneries: 3 (South, North, East)
- Coordinates: 32°45′14″N 116°55′27″W

Statistics
- Parishes: 12 (2023)
- Members: 71,200 (2023)

Information
- Denomination: Catholic Church
- Sui iuris church: Chaldean Catholic Church
- Rite: Chaldean Rite
- Established: May 21, 2002 (23 years ago)
- Cathedral: St. Peter Chaldean Catholic Cathedral
- Secular priests: 21, plus 1 religious priest and 16 permanent deacons (2023)

Current leadership
- Pope: Leo XIV
- Patriarch: sede vacante
- Bishop: sede vacante
- Apostolic Administrator: Saad Sirop

Map
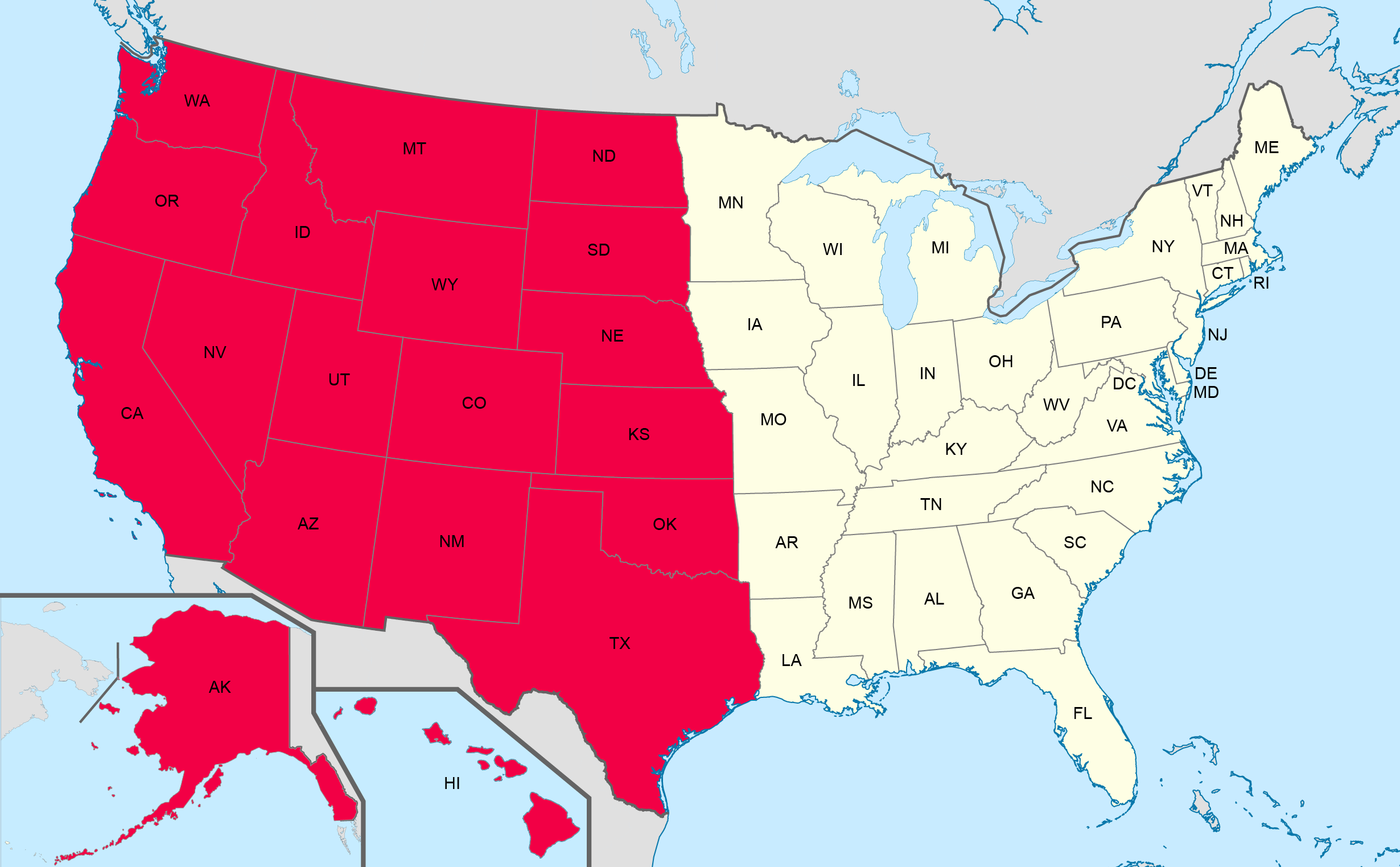

Website
- www.stpeterdiocese.org

Chaldean Eparchy of Saint Peter the Apostle (Latin: Eparchia Sancti Petri Apostoli urbis Sancti Didaci Chaldaeorum) is a Chaldean Catholic Church eparchy of the Catholic Church in the Western United States.

It practices the Syro-Oriental Rite in the Syriac/Arameic language. It is exempt, i.e., immediately subject to the Holy See, not part of any ecclesiastical province. Its cathedral episcopal see is St. Peter Chaldean Catholic Cathedral, located in El Cajon, California.

== History ==
It was created by Pope John Paul II on May 21, 2002, on territory split off from the Chaldean Catholic Eparchy of Saint Thomas the Apostle of Detroit, also exempt, and the only other Chaldean Catholic diocese in the United States.

== Episcopal ordinaries ==
Exempt Eparchs (Bishops)

- Sarhad Yawsip Jammo (May 5, 2002 – May 7, 2016)
- Bawai Soro, listed as Official (2014–2017), appointed Bishop of Mar Addai of Toronto (Chaldean), Canada
- Emanuel Hana Shaleta (August 29, 2017 – March 10, 2026)
  - Saad Sirop, Apostolic Administrator (since March 10, 2026)

Auxiliary Eparchs

- Bawai Soro (January 11, 2014 – November 29, 2017)

== Extent ==
The diocese is responsible for Chaldean Catholics in nineteen states in the western portion of the United States, the largest concentration of these being found in San Diego County, California.

The Eparchy of St. Peter The Apostle comprises four vicariates consisting of its member parishes.

=== Southern Vicariate ===
The parishes of the Southern Vicariate comprise the Southwest of the United States. The Vicar General of the Diocese is Archdeacon Sabri Kejboe.

- St. Peter's Chaldean Catholic Cathedral, El Cajon, California
- St. Michael's Chaldean Catholic Church, El Cajon, California
- St. John the Apostle Chaldean Catholic Church, El Cajon, California
- St. Joseph Chaldean Catholic Church, Spring Valley, California
- Holy Family Chaldean Catholic Church, Phoenix, Arizona
- Mar Auraha Chaldean Catholic Church, Scottsdale, Arizona
- St. Barbara Chaldean Catholic Church, Las Vegas, Nevada
- St. George Chaldean Catholic Church, Santa Ana, California

=== Northern Vicariate ===
The parishes of the Northern Vicariate comprise the Northwest of the United States.

- St. Thomas Assyrian Chaldean Catholic Church, Turlock, California
- St. Mary Assyrian Chaldean Catholic Church, Campbell, California
- St. Matthew's Chaldean Catholic Church, Ceres, California
- St. Paul Chaldean and Assyrian Catholic Church, North Hollywood, California
- Our Lady of Perpetual Help Chaldean Assyrian Catholic Church, Orangevale, California

=== Missions ===
The parishes listed here are Missions of the Eparchy located throughout the diocese who are currently not large enough, have not raised enough money, or found the proper land to construct their own church and formally create a parish.

- Holy Cross Chaldean Catholic Mission, Gilbert, Arizona
- Our Lady of Perpetual Help Chaldean Catholic Mission, Tucson, Arizona
- Rabban Hermiz Chaldean Catholic Mission, Riverside, California
- Mar Qardagh Chaldean Catholic Mission, Poway, California
- St Mary Chaldean Catholic Mission, Marina, California
- Holy Spirit Chaldean Catholic Mission, Houston, Texas
- St Joseph Chaldean Catholic Mission, Dallas, Texas

=== Monasteries, convents and seminaries ===
The fourth vicarate comprises the vocational housing of the non-diocesan religious life within the Eparchy.

- St. George Monastery, Riverside, California
- Sons of the Covenant Monastery, El Cajon, California (32.8207916°N 116.9444461°W): a men's monastery of eparchial right, and is dedicated to a life of contemplative prayer, community life, and service to the faithful of the eparchy. They are led by Fr. Ankido Sipo. The monastery maintains an open prayer policy, allowing the public to participate in their communal prayer sessions, reflecting their commitment to communal unity. The monks also engage in various duties based on their talents, including pastoral services at St. John Chaldean Catholic Church, youth ministry, sacristan duties, and church maintenance. In 2023, two brothers professed their final vows in the Chaldean order of monks known as the Sons of the Covenant, further enriching the Eparchy of St. Peter in San Diego.
- The Seminary of Mar Abba the Great, El Cajon, California
- Chaldean Sisters of the Immaculate Conception, El Cajon, California

== See also ==
- Eastern Catholic eparchs in the United States
- Latin Catholic Diocese of San Diego

== Sources and external links ==
- Official website
- Eparchy profile at Catholic-Hierarchy.org
- Eparchy profile at GCatholic.org
- Sons of the Covenant Monastery
