= Bawai Soro =

Iraqi Catholic bishop

His Excellency, The Most Reverend Bawai Ashur Soro
- Eparch of Toronto
- Church: Chaldean Catholic Church
- Diocese: Chaldean Catholic Eparchy of Mar Addai of Toronto
- Appointed: October 31, 2017
- Installed: November 29, 2017
- Retired: September 11, 2021
- Predecessor: Emanuel Hana Shaleta
- Successor: Robert Saeed Jarjis
- Other post: Spiritual Director, Seminary of Mar Abba the Great
- Previous posts: Auxiliary Eparch of the Chaldean Catholic Eparchy of San Diego; Titular Bishop of Foratiana

Orders
- Ordination: February 21, 1982
- Consecration: October 21, 1984 by the patriarch Mar Dinkha IV

Personal details
- Born: Ashur Soro; March 3, 1954 (age 72) Kirkuk, Iraq

Styles of Bawai Soro
- Reference style: His Excellency; The Most Reverend
- Spoken style: His Grace
- Religious style: Eparch

Bawai Ashur Soro (born March 3, 1954) is the former Eparch of the Chaldean Catholic Church for the Chaldean Catholic Eparchy of Mar Addai of Toronto.

== Biography ==
Soro was baptized in the Assyrian Church of the East. He was ordained to the priesthood in 1982 and to the episcopate in 1984 by Mar Dinkha IV. He served the Assyrian eparchy of the Western United States, and subsequently the eparchy of California. Mar Bawai was one of the few theologians of the Assyrian Church, and so was assigned responsibility for leading the theological dialogue with the Catholic Church which produced the joint Christological Declaration in 1994, resolving a 1500-year-old theological dispute and the principal reason for schism between the Churches in the first place.

While still an Assyrian bishop, Mar Bawai was pursuing studies first at the Catholic University of America in Washington, then earned a doctorate in ecumenism from the Pontifical University of St Thomas Aquinas in Rome, in 2002.

However, after two decades of successful dialogue made clear that there were no obstacles to full communion, the patriarchal synod suspended the official dialogue in 2004. Soro was suspended in November 2005 for alleged "rebellion of dogma," after attempting to usurp the diocese by incorporating several Churches under his name, and barring Church leadership from the properties. In 2007, after numerous lawsuits, Soro was ordered by the Supreme Court of California to surrender all Church property, and was formally laicized and defrocked by the Assyrian Holy Synod in 2008.

Bishop Mar Bawai Soro (along with nearly one thousand Assyrian Christian families) was received into communion with the Chaldean Catholic Church in May 2008. In 2010, he was invited back to the Angelicum as a visiting professor of Aramaic Christian history.

Pope Francis controversially appointed Soro auxiliary eparch for the Chaldean Catholic Eparchy of Saint Peter the Apostle of San Diego on January 11, 2014. On October 31, 2017, Pope Francis appointed Soro as eparch of the Chaldean Catholic Eparchy of Mar Addai of Toronto. He was installed on November 29, 2017. On September 11, 2021, he resignation was accepted by Pope Francis.

== See also ==
- Catholic Church hierarchy
- Catholic Church in the United States
- Historical list of the Catholic bishops of the United States
- List of Catholic bishops of the United States
- Lists of patriarchs, archbishops, and bishops

== Episcopal succession ==
Catholic Church titles
Preceded by Emanuel Hana Shaleta	Eparch of Toronto; 2017-Present	Succeeded by Incumbent
Preceded by -	Auxiliary Eparch of the Chaldean Catholic Eparchy of San Diego; 2014-2017	Succeeded by -
