= Chaldean Catholic Eparchy of Mar Addai of Toronto =

Eastern Catholic eparchy in Canada

Coordinates: 43.75599°N 79.53832°W

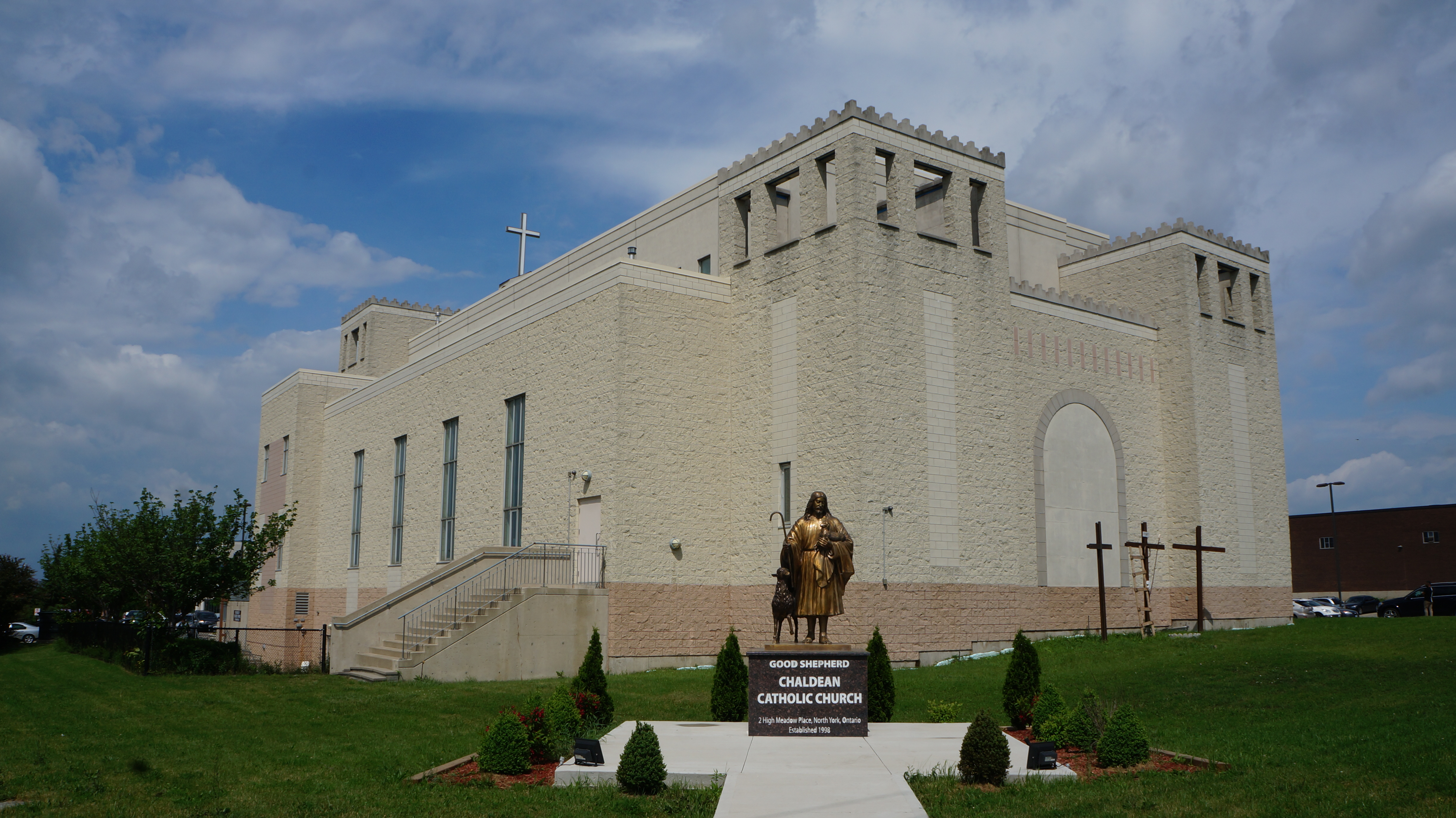
- Good Shepherd Cathedral

Location
- Country: Canada
- Ecclesiastical province: Immediately Subject to the Holy See

Statistics
- Population: (as of 2016); 38,000
- Parishes: 7

Information
- Sui iuris church: Chaldean Catholic Church
- Rite: Chaldean Rite
- Established: June 10, 2011
- Cathedral: Cathedral of the Good Shepherd

Current leadership
- Pope: Leo XIV
- Eparch: Robert Saeed Jarjis
- Bishops emeritus: Bawai Soro

The Chaldean Catholic Eparchy of Mar Addai of Toronto is the sole eparchy (Eastern Catholic diocese) of the Chaldean Catholic Church (Syro-Oriental Rite) in Canada.

It depends directly on the Chaldean Catholic Patriarch of Babylon, but it not part of any ecclesiastical province.

Its cathedral is the Cathedral of the Good Shepherd, in North York, Toronto, Ontario.

As of 2016, the eparchy served 31,716 of the faithful. Seven priests and 40 permanent deacons preside over eight parishes, which are located in the provinces of Ontario, Quebec, Saskatchewan, Alberta, and British Columbia.

== History ==
The eparchy was established on June 10, 2011 on territory previously not served by the Patriarchal particular church sui iuris.

== Episcopal ordinaries ==
(all Chaldean Rite)

Eparchs (Bishops) of Mar Addai of Toronto

- Hanna Zora (June 10, 2011 – May 3, 2014), previously Archeparch (Archbishop) of Ahvaz of the Chaldeans (Iran) (May 1, 1974 – June 10, 2011)
- Apostolic Administrator Father Daoud Baffro (May 3, 2014 – January 15, 2015)
- Emanuel Hana Shaleta (January 15, 2015 – August 9, 2017), appointed Bishop of Saint Peter the Apostle of San Diego (Chaldean), USA
- Bawai Soro (November 29, 2017 – September 11, 2021)
- Robert Saeed Jarjis (September 11, 2021 – present)

=== Churches and Missions ===
- Good Shepherd Chaldean Catholic Cathedral, North York, Ontario
- St. Joseph Chaldean Catholic Church, London, Ontario
- Holy Family Chaldean Catholic Church, Windsor, Ontario
- St. Peter Chaldean Catholic Church, Oakville, Ontario
- Mar Mari Chaldean Catholic Church, Mississauga, Ontario
- Mar Oraha Chaldean Catholic Church, Kitchener, Ontario
- St. Thomas Chaldean Catholic Church, Hamilton, Ontario
- St. Paul Chaldean Catholic Church, Surrey, British Columbia
- St. Mary Chaldean Catholic Church, Calgary, Alberta
- Sacred Heart Chaldean Catholic Church, Saskatoon, Saskatchewan
- Sts. Martyrs of the East Chaldean Catholic Church, Montreal, Quebec

=== Missions ===
- Our Lady of Nineveh Chaldean Catholic Mission, Richmond Hill, Ontario

== Source and External links ==
- GCatholic with incumbent biography links
