= Basel Yaldo =

Iraqi Chaldean Catholic hierarch (born 1970)

The Most Reverend Basel Salim Yaldo
- Auxiliary Bishop of the Chaldean Catholic Patriarchate of Baghdad
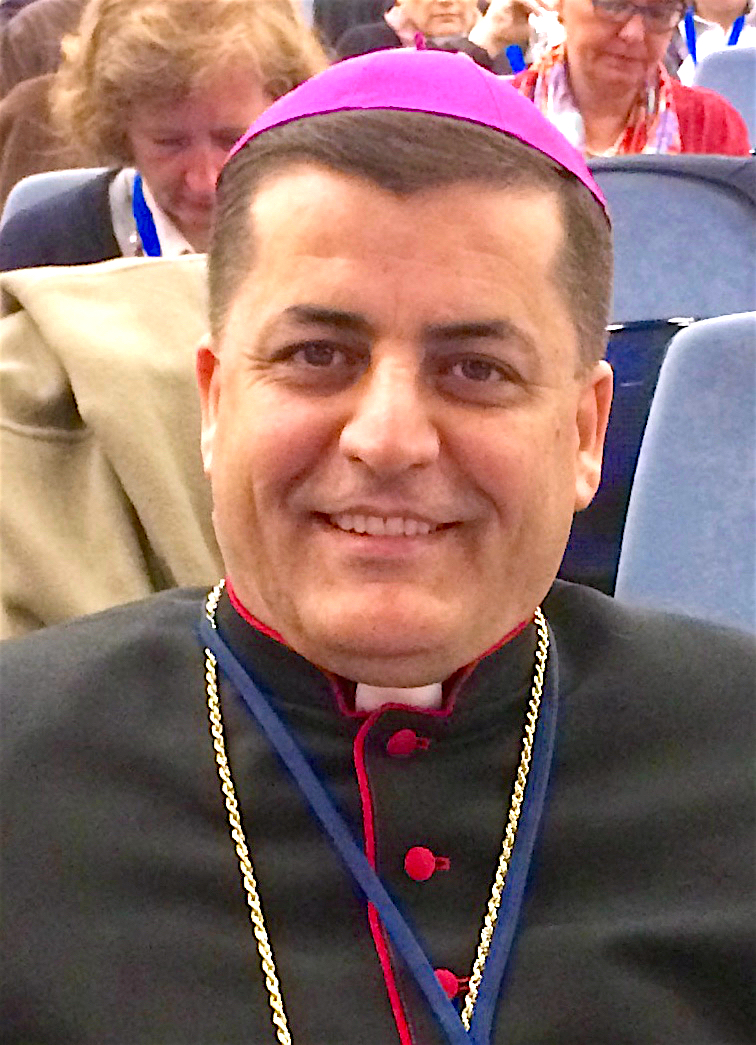
- Church: Chaldean Catholic Church
- See: Bethzabda (Titular)

Orders
- Ordination: 23 November 2002 by Ibrahim Namo Ibrahim
- Consecration: 6 February 2015 by Louis Raphaël I Sako

Personal details
- Born: 23 May 1970 (age 56) Tel Keppe, Iraq
- Education: Pontifical Urban University

Basel Salim Yaldo (born 23 May 1970) is an Iraqi Chaldean Catholic hierarch, who has served as an auxiliary bishop of the Chaldean Catholic Patriarchate of Baghdad and the Titular Bishop of Bethzabda since 2015.

== Early life and education ==
Basel Salim Yaldo was born in Tel Keppe, Iraq, on 23 May 1970. He pursued his theological and philosophical studies at the Babel College in Baghdad. Following his initial formation, he moved to Rome to study at the Pontifical Urban University, where he earned a Doctorate in Dogmatic Theology. He was ordained a priest on 23 November 2002.

== Priest ministry ==
Following his ordination, Yaldo served in various pastoral roles in Baghdad. In September 2006, amid the sectarian violence following Pope Benedict XVI's Regensburg lecture, Yaldo was kidnapped in Baghdad. He was held captive for three days, during which he was beaten and pressured to renounce his faith. He later stated that the ordeal "brought me closer to God and strengthened my faith," and credited the recitation of the Rosary for his psychological survival.

Following his release, he moved to the United States for security reasons in 2007. He served the Chaldean diaspora at St. George Chaldean Catholic Church in Shelby Township, Michigan, within the Chaldean Catholic Eparchy of Saint Thomas the Apostle of Detroit. He later returned to Rome to complete his doctoral studies before returning to Iraq to serve as secretary to Patriarch Emmanuel III Delly.

== Episcopal ministry ==
On 15 January 2015, Pope Francis confirmed his election by the Chaldean Synod as the Auxiliary Bishop of the Chaldean Patriarchate of Babylon (now Baghdad) and assigned him the titular see of Bethzabda. He was consecrated on 6 February 2015 by Patriarch Louis Raphaël I Sako.

Yaldo has been a vocal advocate for the Christian community in Iraq, particularly following the displacement caused by the Islamic State. He has frequently visited liberated towns in the Nineveh Plains, describing the region as "our Holy Land" and emphasizing the importance of Christians returning to their ancestral homes.

He has also expressed concerns regarding the long-term security and political stability of Christians in Iraq, noting that while military victories are significant, the underlying social and political issues often cause hopes for a permanent return to fade.
