= Saad Sirop =

Iraqi Chaldean Catholic bishop (born 1972)

The Most Reverend Saad Hanna Sirop
- Apostolic administrator of the Chaldean Catholic Eparchy of Saint Peter the Apostle of San Diego
- Church: Chaldean Catholic Church
- Previous post: Apostolic Visitor for Chaldean faithful in Europe (2016–2025)

Orders
- Ordination: 13 October 2001
- Consecration: 24 January 2014 by Louis Raphaël I Sako

Personal details
- Born: Saad Hanna Sirop; 6 September 1972 (age 53) Baghdad, Iraq
- Education: University of Baghdad, Pontifical Urban University, Pontifical Gregorian University

Saad Hanna Sirop (born 6 September 1972) is an Iraqi hierarch of the Chaldean Catholic Church who has served as titular bishop of Hirta and auxiliary bishop of the Patriarchate of Babylon of the Chaldeans. He was appointed apostolic visitor for Chaldean faithful residing in Europe in 2016 and later served as apostolic administrator of the Chaldean Catholic Eparchy of Saint Peter the Apostle of San Diego since 2026.

== Early life and education ==
Sirop was born in Baghdad, Iraq, on 6 September 1972. He first studied aeronautical engineering before entering the Chaldean seminary in Baghdad. He later pursued studies in theology and philosophy at the Pontifical Urban University in Rome, and later obtaining a doctorate in philosophy from the Pontifical Gregorian University.

== Priesthood ==
Sirop was ordained a priest on 13 October 2001. During his priestly ministry he served in pastoral and academic roles, including work at the Babel College for Philosophy and Theology in Baghdad.

In 2006 he was kidnapped during a Mass by militants associated with Al-Qaeda. He was held for 28 days and reportedly tortured before being released.

== Episcopacy ==
On 11 January 2014 the Synod of Bishops of the Chaldean Catholic Church elected Sirop as auxiliary bishop of the Patriarchate of Babylon of the Chaldeans. Pope Francis granted his assent to the election and appointed him titular bishop of Hirta. He was consecrated bishop on 24 January 2014 by Louis Raphaël I Sako, the Chaldean Patriarch of Babylon.

On 19 November 2016 he was appointed apostolic visitor for Chaldean faithful residing in Europe. His resignation from this office was accepted on 1 July 2025.

On 10 March 2026 he was appointed apostolic administrator of the Chaldean Catholic Eparchy of Saint Peter the Apostle of San Diego.

== Public statements ==
Sirop has publicly spoken about the political and social difficulties faced by Christians in Iraq, including corruption and instability affecting the country and its Christian communities.
