= St. Peter Chaldean Catholic Cathedral (El Cajon, California) =

St. Peter Cathedral
- St. Peter Chaldean Catholic Cathedral
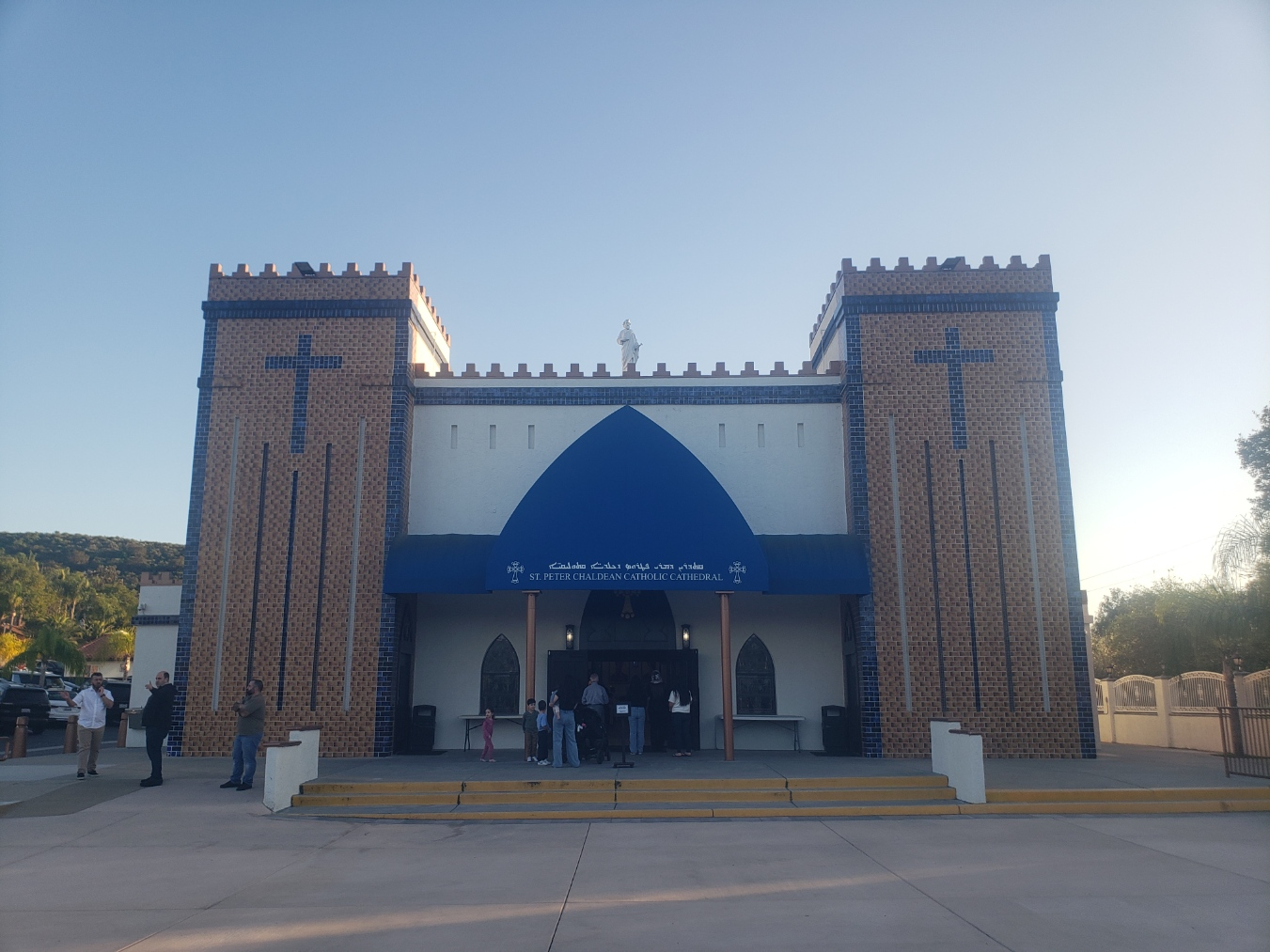
- St. Peter Chaldean Catholic Cathedral on the feast day of St. Moses, 2026
- St. Peter Cathedral
- 32°45′14.24″N 116°55′27.26″W
- Location: 1627 Jamacha Way; El Cajon, California
- Country: United States
- Denomination: Chaldean Catholic Church

History
- Founded: December 6, 1973
- Dedicated: September 10, 1983

Architecture
- Style: Byzantine Revival
- Completed: 1983

Specifications
- Capacity: 600

Administration
- Diocese: Eparchy of St. Peter the Apostle

Clergy
- Bishop: sede vacante
- Rector: Rev. Michael J. Bazzi

St. Peter Cathedral is a Chaldean Catholic cathedral located in El Cajon, California, United States. It is the seat for the Eparchy of St. Peter the Apostle.

== History ==
The first Chaldean Catholic Assyrian people to immigrate to the United States arrived at the end of the nineteenth century. Although small in number, they were spread across the country by the middle of the twentieth century. St. Peter Chaldean Catholic parish was established in 1973 with Father Peter Kattoula as its first pastor.

The present church building was completed in 1983 and dedicated on September 10 of that year. It has a seating capacity of 600 people. The church hall was opened on November 29, 1989. It became a cathedral when the Eparchy of St. Peter the Apostle was established in 2002.

In September 2020 the cathedral was vandalized with graffiti of contradictory messages including among other things pentagrams, upside down crosses, white power, swastikas, "BLM", and "Biden 2020".

== Community outreach ==
St. Peter Cathedral collaborates with local organizations such as the Mar Toma Council, a Knights of Columbus council, to support community initiatives. In 2014, the cathedral hosted a fundraising event with the Mar Toma Council that raised $650,000 for Christian refugees impacted by conflicts in Mosul and the Nineveh Plains. These efforts were part of broader activities to support displaced communities in Iraq, Turkey, Syria, and Lebanon.

== See also ==
- List of Catholic cathedrals in the United States
- List of cathedrals in the United States
