= Robert Jarjis =

Chaldean Catholic bishop (born 1973)

The Most Reverend Robert Saeed Jarjis
- Bishop of the Chaldean Catholic Eparchy of Mar Addai of Toronto
- Church: Chaldean Catholic Church
- Diocese: Mar Addai of Toronto
- Appointed: 11 September 2021
- Predecessor: Bawai Soro
- Other post: Auxiliary Bishop of Baghdad (2018–2021)

Orders
- Ordination: 27 April 2008 by Pope Benedict XVI
- Consecration: 18 January 2019 by Louis Raphaël I Sako, Ramzi Garmou, Bawai Soro

Personal details
- Born: 23 October 1973 (age 52) Baghdad, Iraq
- Denomination: Chaldean Catholic Church
- Residence: Toronto, Ontario, Canada
- Education: University of Baghdad, Pontifical Urban University, Pontifical Biblical Institute
- Motto: We have seen His glory

Robert Saeed Jarjis (born 23 October 1973) is an Iraqi-born Chaldean Catholic hierarch, who has served as the Bishop of the Chaldean Catholic Eparchy of Mar Addai of Toronto since 2021. He previously served as the Auxiliary Bishop of the Chaldean Catholic Archeparchy of Baghdad (2018–2021).

== Early life and education ==
Robert Saeed Jarjis was born on 23 October 1973 in Baghdad, Iraq. He initially earned a degree in veterinary medicine from the University of Baghdad. Following his religious calling, he moved to Rome to study at the Pontifical Urban University, where he obtained a baccalaureate and a licentiate in theology. He later earned a licentiate in Biblical theology from the Pontifical Biblical Institute.

== Priesthood ==
He was ordained a priest on 27 April 2008 for the Archeparchy of Baghdad by Pope Benedict XVI at the St. Peter's Basilica. Following his ordination, he served in several pastoral roles, including parish priest of Mary Mother of Sorrows in Baghdad and Rector of the St. Peter Patriarchal Seminary. He also served as the parish priest of the Church of the Assumption in Baghdad.

== Episcopate ==
On 22 December 2018, Pope Francis gave his assent to the election of Jarjis by the Synod of Bishops of the Chaldean Church as the Auxiliary Bishop of Baghdad, assigning him the titular see of Arsamosata. He was consecrated on 18 January 2019 by Patriarch Louis Raphaël I Sako, assisted by Ramzi Garmou and Bawai Soro at the St. Joseph Chaldean Catholic Cathedral in Baghdad.

During his time in Baghdad, he played a significant role in organizing the logistics for the 2021 apostolic journey of Pope Francis to Iraq, describing the visit as a "miracle of peace" for the country.

On 11 September 2021, he was appointed Bishop of the Chaldean Catholic Eparchy of Mar Addai of Toronto, succeeding Bishop Bawai Soro.
