= Shlemon Warduni =

- Titular Bishop of Anbar dei Caldei
- Church: Chaldean Catholic Church
- See: Auxiliary Bishop of the Patriarchate of Babylon
- In office: 2001 — 10 August 2021
- Successor: incumbent

Orders
- Ordination: 29 June 1968
- Consecration: 16 February 2001

Personal details
- Born: 24 April 1943 (age 82) Batnaya, Kingdom of Iraq

Mar Shlemon Warduni (born 24 April 1943) is an Iraqi Chaldean Catholic hierarch, who served Auxiliary Bishop of the Patriarchate of Babylon, Iraq from 2001 until 2021. In 2003 he was the Locum tenens of the Patriarch of Babylon of the Chaldeans.

== Life ==
Shlemon Warduni was born at Batnaya, Iraq on 24 April 1943, and was ordained priest on 29 June 1968. On 12 January 2001, he was appointed Auxiliary Bishop of the Patriarchate of Babylon and he was consecrated bishop on 16 February 2001, by Patriarch Mar Raphael I Bidawid.

After the death of Patriarch Mar Raphael I Bidawid, he was appointed Locum tenens of the Patriarch of Babylon of the Chaldeans till the election, on 3 December 2003, of Patriarch Mar Emmanuel III Delly.

He retired as an auxiliary bishop of Baghdad on 10 August 2021.
