= Chaldean Catholic Church =

Eastern Catholic church based primarily in Iraq

Chaldean Catholic Church
- Classical Syriac: ܥܕܬܐ ܟܠܕܝܬܐ ܩܬܘܠܝܩܝܬܐ
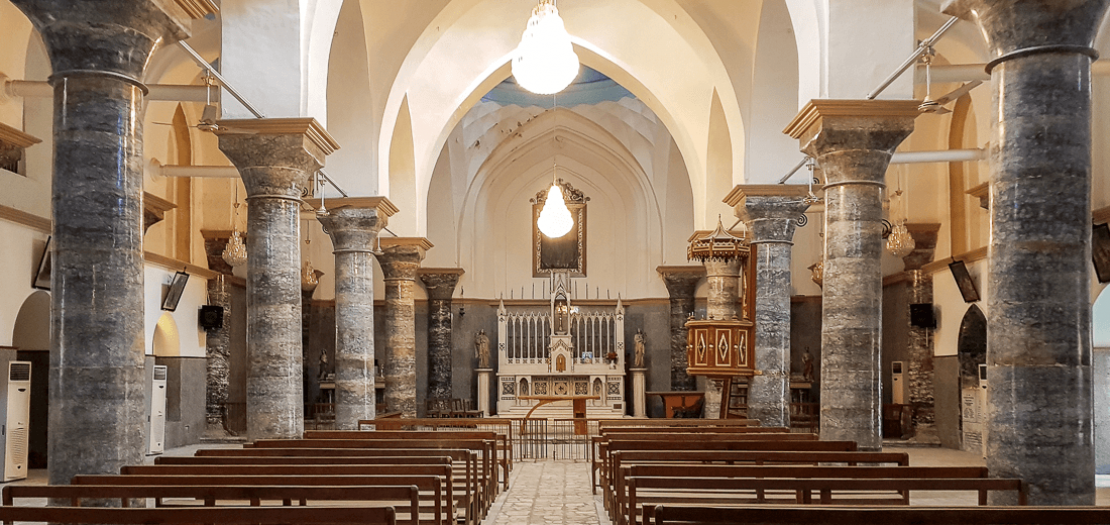
- Interior of the Cathedral of Our Lady of Sorrows in Baghdad, Iraq
- Type: Particular church (sui iuris)
- Classification: Christian
- Orientation: Eastern Catholic; Syriac
- Scripture: Peshitta
- Theology: Catholic theology
- Governance: Holy Synod of the Chaldean Church
- Pope: Leo XIV
- Patriarch: Paul III Nona
- Region: Iraq, Iran, Turkey, Syria, Lebanon; diaspora in North America, Europe, and Australia
- Language: Liturgical: Syriac
- Liturgy: East Syriac Rite
- Headquarters: Cathedral of St. Joseph, Baghdad, Iraq
- Founder: Traditionally traced to Thomas the Apostle via Addai and Mari; established in 1552 under Shimun VIII Yohannan Sulaqa
- Origin: 1552; Ottoman Iraq
- Separated from: Church of the East
- Separations: Assyrian Church of the East
- Members: 616,639 (2018)
- Other name: Chaldean Patriarchate
- Official website: chaldeanpatriarchate.com

The Chaldean Catholic Church (Classical Syriac: ܥܕܬܐ ܟܠܕܝܬܐ ܩܬܘܠܝܩܝܬܐ, ʿĒdtā Kalḏāytā Qāṯōlīqāytā; Arabic: الكنيسة الكلدانية, al-Kanīsa al-Kaldāniyya; Latin: Ecclesia Chaldaeorum Catholica) is an Eastern Catholic particular church (sui iuris) descended from the historic Church of the East. It is in full communion with the Holy See and the worldwide Catholic Church. It uses the East Syriac Rite in the Syriac language.

The church is headed by the Patriarch of Baghdad of the Chaldeans (until 2022, patriarch of Babylon), currently Paul III Nona, seated in the Cathedral of St. Joseph in Baghdad, Iraq. As of 2018, it counted approximately 616,639 members globally, with most residing in Iraq and significant diasporic communities in North America, Canada, Australia, and Europe.

The Chaldean Catholic Church emerged in the Schism of 1552, when a faction of the Church of the East sought to restore full communion with the Catholic Church. This occurred amidst internal crises in the Church of the East largely concerning the practice of hereditary succession to the patriarchate (from uncle to nephew) that had begun in the 14th century. In 1830, the traditional patriarchal line was united to, and has since led, the Chaldean Catholic Church.

== Demographics ==
According to the United States Commission on International Religious Freedom, citing the Iraqi Christian Foundation, around 80% of Iraqi Christians are Chaldean Catholics. A 2018 report by the U.S. Department of State estimated that 67% of Christians in Iraq belonged to the Chaldean Catholic Church. The European Union Agency for Asylum cited similar figures in its 2019 country guidance.

The majority of adherents are ethnic Assyrians, also referred to as Chaldo-Assyrians. Chaldean communities are primarily located in northern Iraq, especially in towns such as Alqosh, Ankawa, Araden, Tel Keppe, and Shaqlawa, as well as among diaspora populations.

== Terminology ==
Neither before nor after the 15th century did the term "Chaldean" indicate a supposed ethnic connection of the Church of the East with ancient south Babylonian Chaldea and its inhabitants, which emerged during the 9th century BC after Chaldean tribes migrated from the Levant region of Urfa in Upper Mesopotamia to southeast Mesopotamia, and disappeared from history during the 6th century BC: it referred instead to the use by Christians of that church of the Syriac language, a form of the biblical Aramaic language, which was then and indeed until the 19th century generally called Chaldean.

Outside of Catholic Church usage, the term "Chaldean" continued to apply to all associated with the Church of the East tradition, whether they were in communion with Rome or not. It indicated not race or nationality, but only language or religion. Throughout the 19th century, it continued to be used of East Syriac Christians, whether "Nestorian" or Catholic, and this usage continued into the 20th century.

=== Historical usage ===
==== 4th century ====
For many centuries, from at least the time of Jerome (c. 347 – 420), the term "Chaldean" was a misnomer that indicated the Biblical Aramaic language and was still the normal name in the nineteenth century. Jerome did know that Aramaic was in the Bible, where he designated the biblical Aramaic by the term "Chaldean". Jerome implied that one reason the books of Tobit and Judith are undeserving of inclusion within the biblical canon is because they were written in Chaldean. Because he translated the Hebrew Bible, he would naturally recognize each time which language would be much more difficult for him when the passages changed from Hebrew to Chaldean.

In Porphyry's Philosophy from Oracles, quoted by Eusebius of Caesarea in Praeparatio Evangelica, from the early 4th century AD, the term "Chaldean" was mentioned as a synonym for "Assyrian": "The discovery was ascribed by the god to Egyptians, Phoenicians, Chaldeans (for these are the Assyrians), Lydians, and Hebrews."

==== 15th–16th centuries ====
Only in 1445 did it begin to be used to mean Aramaic speakers in communion with the Catholic Church, on the basis of a decree of the Council of Florence, which accepted the profession of faith that Timothy, metropolitan of the Aramaic speakers in Cyprus, made in Aramaic, and which decreed that "nobody shall in future dare to call [...] Chaldeans, Nestorians".

In the 16th century, Spanish cleric Francis Xavier used the term "Chaldean" for the Syriac language in this statement: "Not even the Caciz themselves understand the prayers which they recite: which are in a foreign language (I think Chaldean). They render special honours to the Apostle St. Thomas, claiming to be descendants of the Christians begotten to Jesus Christ by that Apostle in these countries."

==== 19th century ====
A letter from November 14, 1838, states: “The so-called “Chaldeans" of Mesopotamia received that title, as you know, from the pope, on their becoming Catholics." Previously, when there were as yet no Catholic Aramaic speakers of Mesopotamian origin, the term "Chaldean" was applied with explicit reference to their "Nestorian" religion. Thus Jacques de Vitry wrote of them in 1220/1 that "they denied that Mary was the Mother of God and claimed that Christ existed in two persons. They consecrated leavened bread and used the 'Chaldean' (Syriac) language". The decree of the Council of Florence was directed against use of "Chaldean" to signify "non-Catholic."

In 1852 George Percy Badger distinguished those whom he called Chaldeans from those whom he called Nestorians, but by religion alone, never by language, race or nationality.

The Assyrian ethnicity of Chaldean Catholics is also attested by Assyriology. In 1881, archeologist and author Hormuzd Rassam stated: “The inhabitants of Assyria consist now of mixed races, Arabs, Turkomans, Koords, Yezeedees, Jews, and Christians called Chaldeans and Syrians. The last two-named denominations doubtless belong to one nationality, the Assyrian, and they were only distinguished by these two names when they separated consequent upon the theological dispute of the age, namely, Monophisites or Jacobites, and Nestorians."

==== Contemporary ====
In 1920, Herbert Henry Austin stated: “It may not be out of place, therefore, to point out that there were exceedingly few Roman Catholic Assyrians or “Chaldeans" as they are generally termed when they embrace Rome, amongst the refugees at Baqubah. The very large majority of the Roman Catholic Assyrians in the Mosul vilayet did not join the mountaineers and fight against the Turks and in consequence were permitted by the Turks to continue to dwell practically unmolested in their homes about Mosul."

Patriarch Raphael I Bidawid of the Chaldean Catholic Church (1989–2003), who accepted the term Assyrian as descriptive of his nationality and ethnicity, commented: "When a portion of the Church of the East became Catholic in the 17th Century, the name given to the church was 'Chaldean' based on the Magi kings who were believed by some to have come from what once had been the land of the Chaldean, to Bethlehem. The name 'Chaldean' does not represent an ethnicity, just a church [...] We have to separate what is ethnicity and what is religion [...] I myself, my sect is Chaldean, but ethnically, I am Assyrian." Earlier, he said: "Before I became a priest I was an Assyrian, before I became a bishop I was an Assyrian, I am an Assyrian today, tomorrow, forever, and I am proud of it."

Chaldean Catholic Archbishop of Urmia, Mar Toma Audo (1854–1918), considered the most elegant Syriac writer of his time, also stressed the remnants of the ancient Assyrians were the East Syrians (Suryāyē Madənkhāyē). Commenting in his Syriac work The Selected Readings, published in 1906, he wrote: "We too, the East Syrians, descend from the aforementioned Assyrians, we are children of the Assyrians or Ashur son of Shem and on account of this we are also Semites. We have preserved until today the language of our ancestors with of course some changes which have entered it." He then continues and explains how "Syrian" (Surāyā) is simply a shortened abbreviation of "Assyrian," and notes that some scholars contemporary to him thought that the Assyrians adopted the name "Syrian" after converting to Christianity.

== History ==
=== The Church of the East ===
The Chaldean Catholic Church traces its beginnings to the Church of the East, which was founded in the Parthian Empire. The Acts of the Apostles mentions Parthians as among those to whom the apostles preached on the day of Pentecost (Acts 2:9). Thomas the Apostle, Thaddeus of Edessa, and Bartholomew the Apostle are reputed to be its founders. One of the modern Churches that boast descent from it says it is "the Church in Babylon" spoken of in 1 Peter 5:13 and that he visited it.

Under the rule of the Sasanian Empire, which overthrew the Parthians in 224, the Church of the East continued to develop its distinctive identity by use of the Syriac language and Syriac script. One "Persian" bishop was at the First Council of Nicaea (325). There is no mention of Persian participation in the First Council of Constantinople (381), in which also the Western part of the Roman Empire was not involved.

The Council of Seleucia-Ctesiphon of 410, held in the Sasanian capital, recognized the city's bishop Isaac as Catholicos, with authority throughout the Church of the East. The persistent military conflicts between the Sasanians and the by then Christianized Roman Empire made the Persians suspect the Church of the East of sympathizing with the enemy. This in turn induced the Church of the East to distance itself increasingly from that in the Roman Empire. Although in a time of peace their 420 council explicitly accepted the decrees of some "western" councils, including that of Nicaea, in 424 they determined that thenceforth they would refer disciplinary or theological problems to no external power, especially not to any "western" bishop or council.

The theological controversy that followed the Council of Ephesus in 431 was a turning point in the history of the Church of the East. The Council condemned as heretical the Christology of Nestorius, whose reluctance to accord the Virgin Mary the title Theotokos "God-bearer, Mother of God" was taken as evidence that he believed two separate persons (as opposed to two united natures) to be present within Christ. The Sasanian Emperor provided refuge for those who in the Nestorian schism rejected the decrees of the Council of Ephesus enforced in the Byzantine Empire. In 484 he executed the pro-Roman Catholicos Babowai. Under the influence of Barsauma, Bishop of Nisibis, the Church of the East officially accepted as normative the teaching not of Nestorius himself, but of his teacher Theodore of Mopsuestia, whose writings the 553 Second Council of Constantinople condemned as Nestorian but some modern scholars view them as orthodox. The position thus assigned to Theodore in the Church of the East was reinforced in several subsequent synods in spite of the opposing teaching of Henana of Adiabeme.

After its split with the West and its adoption of a theology that some called Nestorianism, the Church of the East expanded rapidly in the medieval period due to missionary work. Between 500 and 1400, its geographical horizon extended well beyond its heartland in present-day northern Iraq, northeastern Syria, and southeastern Turkey, setting up communities throughout Central Asia and as far as China—as witnessed by the Xi'an Stele, a Tang dynasty tablet in Chinese script dating to 781 that documented 150 years of Christian history in China. Their most lasting addition was of the Saint Thomas Christians of the Malabar Coast in India, where they had around 10 million followers.

However, a decline had already set in at the time of Yahballaha III (1281–1317), when the Church of the East reached its greatest geographical extent, it had in south and central Iraq and in south, central and east Persia only four dioceses, where at the end of the ninth century it had at least 54.

Around 1400, the Turco-Mongol nomadic conqueror Timur arose out of the Eurasian Steppe to lead military campaigns all across Western, Southern and Central Asia, ultimately seizing much of the Muslim world after defeating the Mamluks of Egypt and Syria, the emerging Ottoman Empire, and the declining Delhi Sultanate. Timur's conquests devastated most Assyrian bishoprics and destroyed the 4000-year-old cultural and religious capital of Assur. After the destruction brought on by Timur, the massive and organized Church of the East structure was largely reduced to its region of origin, with the exception of the Saint Thomas Christians in India.

=== 1552 schism ===
The Church of the East has seen many disputes about the position of Catholicos. A synod in 539 decided that neither of the two claimants, Elisha and Narsai, who had been elected by rival groups of bishops in 524, was legitimate. Similar conflicts occurred between Barsauma and Acacius of Seleucia-Ctesiphon and between Hnanisho I and Yohannan the Leper. The 1552 conflict was not merely between two individuals but extended to two rival lines of patriarchs, like the 1964 schism between what are now called the Assyrian and the Ancient Church of the East.

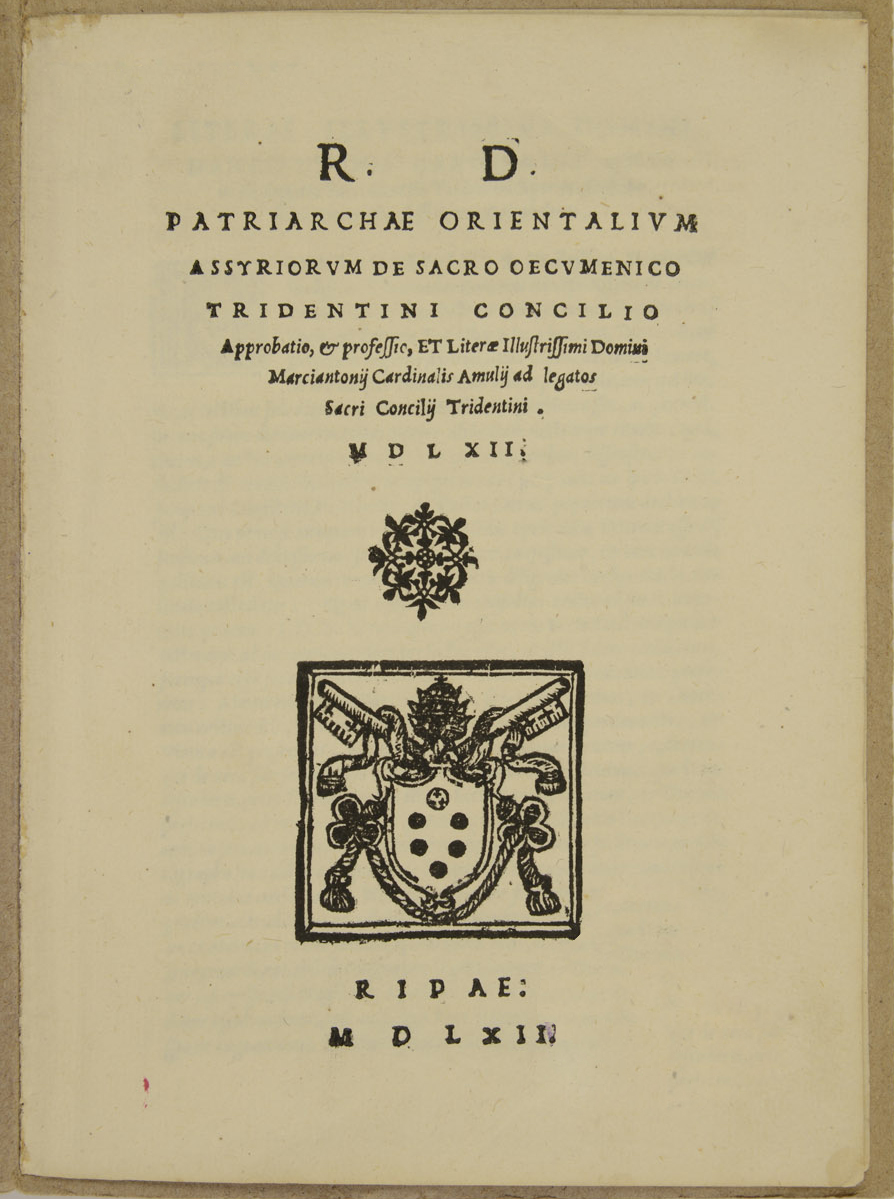
Credentials of Abdisho IV Maron, Sulaqa's successor, to the Council of Trent in 1562

Dissent over the practice of hereditary succession to the Patriarchate, usually from uncle to nephew, led to the action in 1552 by a group of Assyrian bishops who elected as a rival Patriarch the abbot of Rabban Hormizd Monastery (the patriarch's residence), Yohannan Sulaqa. To strengthen the position of their candidate, the bishops sent him to Rome to negotiate a new union with the pope. By tradition, a patriarch could be ordained only by someone of archiepiscopal (metropolitan) rank, a rank to which only members of that one family were promoted. Sulaqa thus travelled to Rome, where, presented as the new patriarch-elect, he entered communion with the Catholic Church on February 20, 1553, was ordained by Pope Julius III and was recognized as patriarch on April 9.

The title or description under which Sulaqa was recognized as patriarch is given variously as "Patriarch of Mosul in Eastern Syria"; "Patriarch of the Church of the Chaldeans of Mosul"; "Patriarch of the Chaldeans"; "Patriarch of Mosul"; or "Patriarch of the Eastern Assyrians", this last being the version given by Pietro Strozzi on the second-last unnumbered page before page 1 of his De Dogmatibus Chaldaeorum, of which an English translation is given in Adrian Fortescue's Lesser Eastern Churches. The "Eastern Assyrians", who, if not Catholic, were presumed to be Nestorians, were distinguished from the "Western Assyrians" (those west of the Tigris River), who were looked on as Jacobites. It was as Patriarch of the "Eastern Assyrians" that Sulaqa's successor, Abdisho IV Maron, was accredited for participation in the Council of Trent.

The names already in use (except that of "Nestorian") were thus applied to the existing church (not a new one) for which the request to consecrate its patriarch was made by emissaries who gave the impression that the patriarchal see was vacant.

Sulaqa returned home in the same year and, unable to take possession of the traditional patriarchal seat near Alqosh, resided in Amid. Before being put to death at the instigation of partisans supporting the patriarch from whom he had broken away, Shemon VII Ishoyahb, he ordained two metropolitans and three other bishops. This initiated a new ecclesiastical hierarchy under what is known as the "Shimun line" of patriarchs, who soon moved from Amid eastward, settling, after many intervening places, in the isolated village of Qudshanis under Persian rule. Ishoyahb, meanwhile, was succeeded by his nephew Eliya VI, in what became known as the "Eliya Line".

=== Successive leaders of those in communion with Rome ===
Sulaqa's earliest successors entered into communion with the Catholic Church, but in the course of over a century, their link with Rome grew weak. The last to request and obtain formal papal recognition died in 1600. They adopted hereditary succession to the patriarchate, opposition to which had caused the 1552 schism. In 1672, Shimun XIII Dinkha formally broke communion with Rome, adopting a profession of faith that contradicted that of Rome, while he maintained his independence from the Alqosh-based "Eliya line" of patriarchs. The "Shimun line" eventually became the patriarchal line of what since 1976 is officially called the Assyrian Church of the East.

Leadership of those who wished to be in communion with Rome then passed to Archbishop Joseph I of Amid. In 1677 his leadership was recognized first by the Turkish civil authorities, and then in 1681 by Rome. (Until then, the authority of the Alqosh patriarch over Amid, which had been Sulaqa's residence but which his successors abandoned on having to move eastward into Safavid Iran, had been accepted by the Turkish authorities.)

All the (non-hereditary) successors in Amid of Joseph I, who in 1696 resigned for health reasons and lived on in Rome until 1707, took the name Joseph: Joseph II (1696–1713), Joseph III (1713–1757), Joseph IV (1757–1781). For that reason, they are known as the "Josephite line". Joseph IV presented his resignation in 1780 and it was accepted in 1781, after which he handed over the administration of the patriarchate to his nephew, not yet a bishop, and retired to Rome, where he lived until 1791.

Appointment of the nephew as patriarch would look like acceptance of the principle of hereditary succession. In addition, the Alqosh "Eliya line" was drawing closer to Rome, and the pro-Catholic faction within its followers was becoming predominant. For various reasons, including the ecclesiastical as well as political turbulence in Europe after the French Revolution, Rome was long unable to choose between two rival claimants to headship of the Chaldean Catholics.

The 1672 adoption by the "Shimun line" of patriarchs of Nestorian doctrine had been followed in some areas by widespread adoption of the opposing Christology upheld in Rome. This occurred not only in the Amid-Mardin area for which by Turkish decree Joseph I was patriarch, but also in the city of Mosul, where by 1700 nearly all the East Syrians were Catholics. The Rabban Hormizd Monastery, which was the seat of the "Eliya line" of patriarchs is 2 km from the village of Alqosh and about 45 km north of the city of Mosul.

In view of this situation, Patriarch Eliya XI wrote to Pope Clement XII and his successor Benedict XIV in 1735, 1749 and 1756, asking for union. Then, in 1771, both he and his designated successor Ishoyabb made a profession of faith that Pope Clement XIV accepted, thus establishing communion in principle. When Eliya XI died in 1778, the metropolitans recognized as his successor Ishoyabb, who accordingly took the Eliya name (Eliya XII). To win support, Eliya made profession of the Catholic faith, but almost immediately renounced it and declared his support of the traditionalist (Nestorian) view.

Yohannan Hormizd, a member of the "Eliya line" family, opposed Eliya XII (1778–1804), the last of that line to be elected in the normal way as patriarch. In 1780 Yohannan was irregularly elected patriarch, as Sulaqa had been in 1552. He won over to communion with Rome most followers of the "Eliyya line". The Holy See did not recognize him as patriarch, but in 1791 Pope Pius VI appointed him archbishop of Amid and administrator of the Catholic patriarchate. The violent protests of Joseph IV's nephew, who was then in Rome, and suspicions raised by others about the sincerity of Yohannan's conversion prevented this being put into effect.

In 1793 it was agreed that Yohannan should withdraw from Amid to Mosul, the metropolitan see that he already held, but that the post of patriarch would not be conferred on his rival, Joseph IV's nephew. In 1802 the latter was appointed metropolitan of Amid and administrator of the patriarchate, but not patriarch. Nonetheless, he became commonly known as Joseph V. He died in 1828. Yohannan's rival for the Alqosh title of patriarch had died in 1804, with his followers so reduced in number that they did not elect any successor for him, thus bringing the Alqosh or Eliya line to an end.

Finally then, in 1830, a century and a half after the Holy See had conferred headship of the Chaldean Catholics on Joseph I of Amid, Pope Pius VIII granted recognition as Patriarch to Yohannan, whose (non-hereditary) patriarchal succession has since then lasted unbroken in the Chaldean Catholic Church.

=== Later history of the Chaldean Church ===
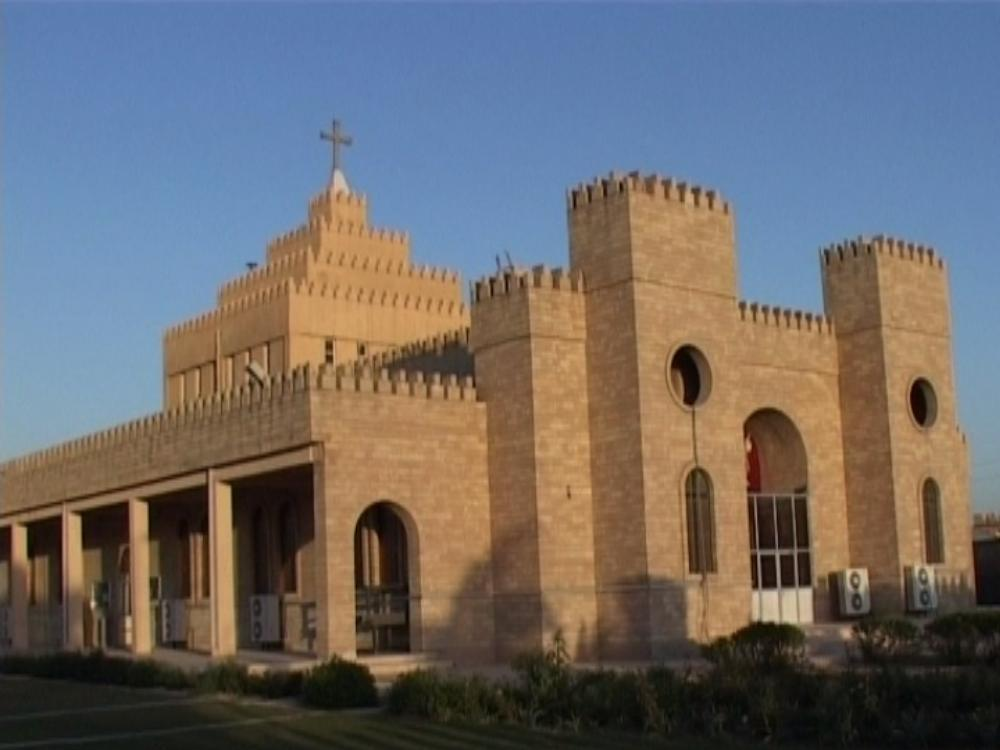
Cathedral of Saint Joseph, Ankawa, Archeparchy of Arbil

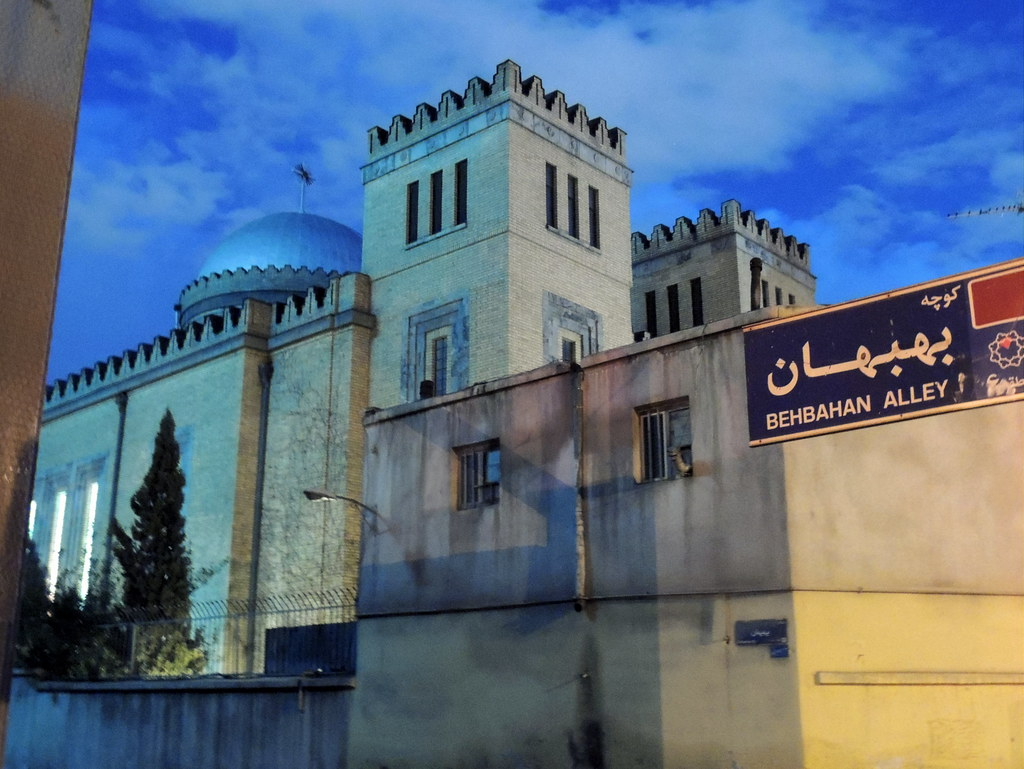
St. Joseph Chaldean Catholic Church, Tehran

In 1838, the Kurds of Soran attacked the Rabban Hormizd Monastery and Alqosh, apparently thinking the villagers were Yazidis responsible for the murder of a Kurdish chieftain, and killed over 300 Chaldean Catholics, including Gabriel Dambo, the refounder of the monastery, and other monks.

In 1846, the Ottoman Empire, which had previously classified as Nestorians those who called themselves Chaldeans, granted them recognition as a distinct millet.

The most famous patriarch of the Chaldean Church in the 19th century was Joseph VI Audo who is remembered also for his clashes with Pope Pius IX mainly about his attempts to extend the Chaldean jurisdiction over the Malabar Catholics. This was a period of expansion for the Chaldean Catholic Church.

The activity of the Turkish army and their Kurdish and Arab allies, partly in response to armed support for Russia in the territory of the Qochanis patriarchate, brought ruin also to the Chaldean dioceses of Amid, Siirt and Gazarta and the metropolitans Addai Scher of Siirt and Philippe-Jacques Abraham of Gazarta were killed in 1915.

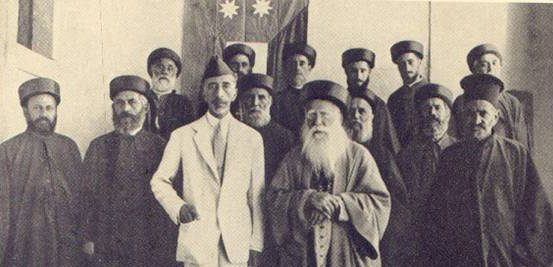
Faisal I of Iraq with Mar Yousef VI Emmanuel II Thomas, Patriarch 1900–1947, and the Chaldean bishops

In the 21st century, Father Ragheed Aziz Ganni, the pastor of the Chaldean Church of the Holy Spirit in Mosul, who graduated from the Pontifical University of Saint Thomas Aquinas, Angelicum in Rome in 2003 with a licentiate in ecumenical theology, was killed on June 3, 2007, in Mosul alongside the subdeacons Basman Yousef Daud, Wahid Hanna Isho, and Gassan Isam Bidawed, after he celebrated Mass. Ganni has since been declared a Servant of God.

Chaldean Archbishop Paulos Faraj Rahho and three companions were abducted on February 29, 2008, in Mosul, and murdered a few days later.

In 2024, Patriarch Louis Raphaël Sako, then head of the Chaldean Catholic Church, dedicated the three-day Nineveh Fast for peace and stability in Iraq, the Holy Land, Ukraine, and the rest of the world, calling on the faithful to "fervently pray to God Almighty to inspire world leaders to seek peace and not war... and to achieve fruitful progress towards reconciliation, fraternal relations, love, and tolerance for the good of humanity".

In March 2026, Sako formally submitted his resignation as patriarch to Pope Leo XIV, emphasizing that his decision was entirely his own and not influenced by external pressure.

=== Historic membership censuses ===
Despite the internal discords of the reigns of Yohannan Hormizd (1830–1838), Nicholas I Zaya (1839–1847) and Joseph VI Audo (1847–1878), the 19th century was a period of considerable growth for the Chaldean church, in which its territorial jurisdiction was extended, its hierarchy strengthened and its membership nearly doubled. In 1850, the Anglican missionary George Percy Badger recorded the population of the Chaldean Catholic Church as 2,743 Chaldean families, or just under 20,000 persons.

Badger's figures cannot be squared with the figure of just over 4,000 Chaldean families recorded by Fulgence de Sainte Marie in 1796 nor with slightly later figures provided by Paulin Martin in 1867. Badger is known to have classified as Nestorian a considerable number of villages in the Aqra district which were Chaldean at this period, and he also failed to include several important Chaldean villages in other dioceses. His estimate is almost certainly far too low.

Table 3: Population of the Chaldean Catholic Church, 1850
Diocese	No. of Villages	No. of Churches	No. of Priests	No. of Families	Diocese	No. of Villages	No. of Churches	No. of Priests	No. of Families
Mosul	9	15	20	1,160	Seert	11	12	9	300
Baghdad	1	1	2	60	Gazarta	7	6	5	179
Amadiya	16	14	8	466	Kirkuk	7	8	9	218
Amid	2	2	4	150	Salmas	1	2	3	150
Mardin	1	1	4	60	Total	55	61	64	2,743

Paulin Martin's statistical survey in 1867, after the creation of the dioceses of Aqra, Zakho, Basra and Sehna by Joseph Audo, recorded a total church membership of 70,268, more than three times higher than Badger's estimate. Most of the population figures in these statistics have been rounded up to the nearest thousand, and they may also have been exaggerated slightly, but the membership of the Chaldean Catholic Church at this period was certainly closer to 70,000 than to Badger's 20,000.

Table 4: Population of the Chaldean Catholic Church, 1867
Diocese	No. of Villages	No. of Priests	No. of Believers	Diocese	No. of Villages	No. of Churches	No. of Believers
Mosul	9	40	23,030	Mardin	2	2	1,000
Aqra	19	17	2,718	Seert	35	20	11,000
Amadiya	26	10	6,020	Salmas	20	10	8,000
Basra	–	–	1,500	Sehna	22	1	1,000
Amid	2	6	2,000	Zakho	15	–	3,000
Gazarta	20	15	7,000	Kirkuk	10	10	4,000
				Total	160	131	70,268

A statistical survey of the Chaldean Catholic Church made in 1896 by J. B. Chabot included, for the first time, details of several patriarchal vicariates established in the second half of the 19th century for the small Chaldean communities in Adana, Aleppo, Beirut, Cairo, Damascus, Edessa, Kermanshah and Teheran; for the mission stations established in the 1890s in several towns and villages in the Qudshanis patriarchate; and for the newly created Chaldean diocese of Urmi. According to Chabot, there were mission stations in the town of Serai d’Mahmideh in Taimar and in the Hakkari villages of Mar Behısho, Sat, Zarne and 'Salamakka' (Ragula d'Salabakkan).

Table 5: Population of the Chaldean Catholic Church, 1896
Diocese	No. of Villages	No. of Priests	No. of Believers	Diocese	No. of Villages	No. of Churches	No. of Believers
Baghdad	1	3	3,000	Amadiya	16	13	3,000
Mosul	31	71	23,700	Aqra	12	8	1,000
Basra	2	3	3,000	Salmas	12	10	10,000
Amid	4	7	3,000	Urmi	18	40	6,000
Kirkuk	16	22	7,000	Sehna	2	2	700
Mardin	1	3	850	Vicariates	3	6	2,060
Gazarta	17	14	5,200	Missions	1	14	1,780
Seert	21	17	5,000	Zakho	20	15	3,500
				Total	177	248	78,790

The last survey of the Chaldean Catholic Church before the First World War was made in 1913 by the Chaldean priest Joseph Tfinkdji, after a period of steady growth since 1896. It then consisted of the patriarchal archdiocese of Mosul and Baghdad, four other archdioceses (Amid, Kirkuk, Seert and Urmi), and eight dioceses (Aqra, Amadiya, Gazarta, Mardin, Salmas, Sehna, Zakho and the newly created diocese of Van). Five more patriarchal vicariates had been established since 1896 (Ahwaz, Constantinople, Basra, Ashshar and Deir al-Zor), giving a total of twelve vicariates.

Tfinkdji's grand total of 101,610 Catholics in 199 villages is slightly exaggerated, as his figures included 2,310 nominal Catholics in twenty-one 'newly converted' or 'semi-Nestorian' villages in the dioceses of Amid, Seert and Aqra, but it is clear that the Chaldean Catholic Church had grown significantly since 1896. With around 100,000 believers in 1913, the membership of the Chaldean church was only slightly smaller than that of the Qudshanis patriarchate (probably 120,000 East Syriac Christians at most, including the population of the nominally Russian Orthodox villages in the Urmi district). Its congregations were concentrated in far fewer villages than those of the Qudshanis patriarchate, and with 296 priests, a ratio of roughly three priests for every thousand believers, it was rather more effectively served by its clergy. Only about a dozen Chaldean villages, mainly in the Seert and Aqra districts, did not have their own priests in 1913.

Table 6: Population of the Chaldean Church, 1913
Diocese	No. of Villages	No. of Churches	No. of Priests	No. of Believers	Diocese	No. of Villages	No. of Churches	No. of Priests	No. of Believers
Mosul	13	22	56	39,460	Amadiya	17	10	19	4,970
Baghdad	3	1	11	7,260	Gazarta	17	11	17	6,400
Vicariates	13	4	15	3,430	Mardin	6	1	6	1,670
Amid	9	5	12	4,180	Salmas	12	12	24	10,460
Kirkuk	9	9	19	5,840	Sehna	1	2	3	900
Seert	37	31	21	5,380	Van	10	6	32	3,850
Urmi	21	13	43	7,800	Zakho	15	17	13	4,880
Aqra	19	10	16	2,390	Total	199	153	296	101,610

Tfinkdji's statistics also highlight the effect on the Chaldean Catholic Church of the educational reforms of the patriarch Joseph VI Audo. The Chaldean Catholic Church on the eve of the First World War was becoming less dependent on the monastery of Rabban Hormizd and the College of the Propaganda for the education of its bishops. Seventeen Chaldean bishops were consecrated between 1879 and 1913, of whom only one (Stephen Yohannan Qaynaya) was entirely educated in the monastery of Rabban Hormizd. Six bishops were educated at the College of the Propaganda (Joseph Gabriel Adamo, Toma Audo, Jeremy Timothy Maqdasi, Isaac Khudabakhash, Theodore Msayeh and Peter Aziz).

The future patriarch Yousef VI Emmanuel II Thomas was trained in the seminary of Ghazir near Beirut. Of the other nine bishops, two (Addai Sher and Francis David) were trained in the Syro-Chaldean seminary in Mosul, and seven (Philip Yaqob Abraham, Yaqob Yohannan Sahhar, Eliya Joseph Khayyat, Shlemun Sabbagh, Yaqob Awgin Manna, Hormizd Stephen Jibri and Israel Audo) in the patriarchal seminary in Mosul.

Table 1: Population of the Chaldean Catholic Church, 1928

Diocese	No. of Villages	No. of Priests	No. of Believers
Mosul and Baghdad	10	50	18,350
Amadiya	18	22	3,765
Amid	1	3	500
Kirkuk	7	18	4,800
Seert	–	–	1,600
Urmi	10	10	2,500
Aqra	–	–	1,000

Diocese	No. of Villages	No. of Churches	No. of Believers
Gazarta	–	–	1,600
Mardin	1	2	400
Salmas	1	1	400
Sehna	3	5	894
Van	–	–	–
Zakho	16	18	8,000
Total	137	129	43,809

Table 2: Population of the Chaldean Catholic Church, 1937

Diocese	No. of Churches	No. of Priests	No. of Believers
Baghdad and Basra	6	13	29,578
Mosul	24	40	44,314
Kirkuk	8	18	7,620
Zakho	16	18	10,852
Amadiya	16	17	5,457
Aqra	13	5	2,779
Urmi	–	–	6,000
Salmas	–	4	3,350

Diocese	No. of Churches	No. of Priests	No. of Believers
Amid	1	1	315
Mardin	1	1	400
Seert	0	0	3,500
Gazarta	1	1	2,250
Syria and Lebanon	2	11	3,107
Vicariates	8	14	9,177
Emigration	0	4	9,889
Sehna	2	5	1,932
Total	98	163	140,720

== Contemporary organization ==
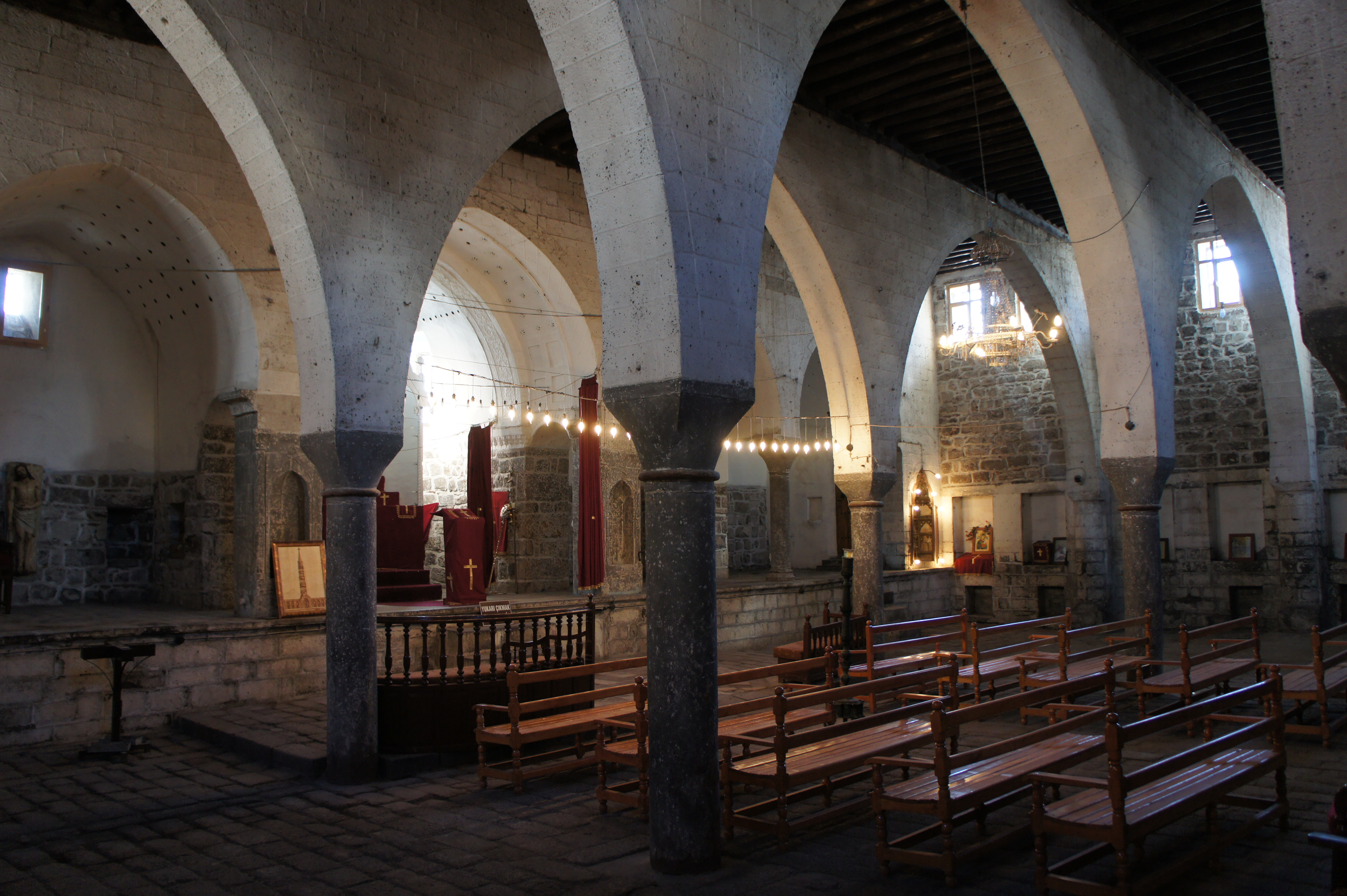
Saint Anthony church in Diyarbakır, Turkey

The Chaldean Catholic Church has the following dioceses:

- Patriarchate of Baghdad
- Metropolitan Archdioceses of Baghdad, Kirkuk, Tehran, Urmia-Salmas
- Archeparchies of Ahwaz, Basra, Diyarbakir, Arbil, Mosul
- Eparchies of Aleppo, Alqosh, Beirut, Cairo, San Diego, Detroit, Toronto, Sydney, Amidyah-Zakho
- Territories dependent on the Patriarch: Jerusalem, Jordan

The Latin name of the church is Ecclesia Chaldaeorum Catholica.

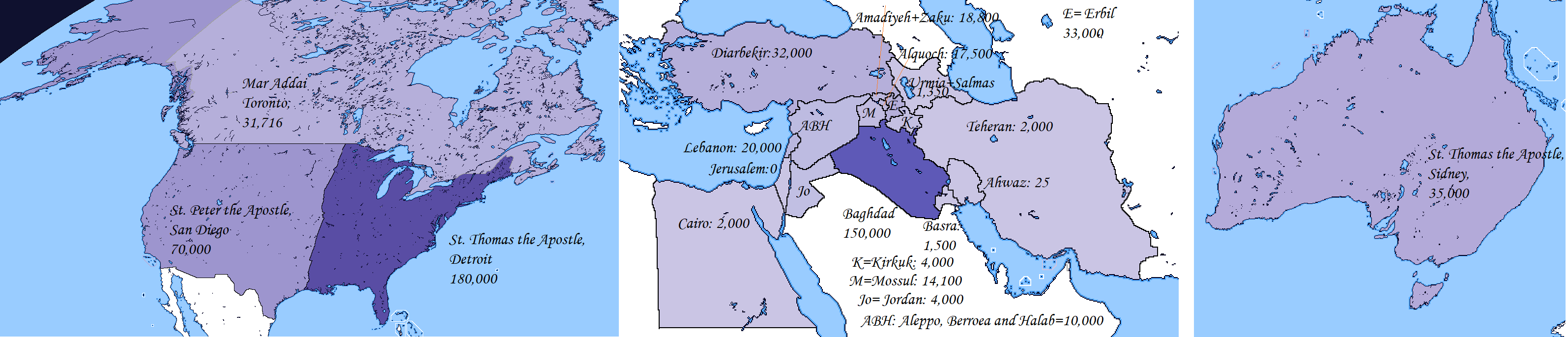
A map of the jurisdictions of the Chaldean Catholic Church

=== Hierarchy ===
The current Patriarch is Paul III Nona. The seat became vacant after the resignation of Louis Raphaël I Sako in March 2026. In October 2007, his predecessor, Emmanuel III Delly became the first Chaldean Catholic patriarch to be elevated to the rank of Cardinal within the Catholic Church.

The present Chaldean episcopate (23 hierarchs as of 17 October 2026) is as follows:

Patriarch

- Paul III Nona, Patriarch of Baghdad (since 12 April 2026)

Eparchial hierarchs

- Bashar Warda CSsR, Archbishop of Abril (since July 2010)
- Habib Al-Naufali, Archbishop of Basra (since 2014) and Apostolic Visitor of Chaldean Catholic Church in Europe (since 2025)
- Yousif Thomas Mirkis OP, Archbishop of Kirkuk-Sulaimaniya (since 2014)
- Najib Mikhael Moussa OP, Archbishop of Mosul-Aqrā (since 2018)
- Imad Khoshaba Gargees, Archbishop of Tehran (since 2023)
- Antoine Audo SJ, Bishop of Aleppo (since January 1992)
- Michel Kassarji, Bishop of Beirut (since 2001)
- Francis Kalabat, Bishop of Saint Thomas the Apostle of Detroit (since June 2014)
- Saad Felix Shabi, Bishop of Zakho (since 2020)
- Robert Jarjis, Bishop of Mar Addai of Toronto (since 2021)
- Azad Sabri Shaba, Bishop of Duhok (since 2022)
- Saad Sirop, Bishop, Apostolic Administrator of Saint Peter the Apostle of San Diego (since 2026)

Auxiliary Bishop

- Basel Yaldo, Auxiliary Bishop of Baghdad and Titular Bishop of BethZabda (since 2015)

Retired hierarchs

- Cardinal Louis Raphaël I Sako, Patriarch emeritus of Baghdad (since March 2026)
- Ramzi Garmou Ist. del Prado, Archbishop emeritus of Diarbikir (Amida) (1999–2023), Administrator of Ahvaz (since 2011)
- Thomas Meram, Archbishop emeritus of Urmia and Salmas (since 2024)
- Jibrail Kassab, Archbishop-Bishop emeritus of Eparchy of Saint Thomas the Apostle of Sydney (2006–2015)
- Ibrahim Namo Ibrahim, Bishop emeritus of Saint Thomas the Apostle of Detroit (since 2014)
- Bawai Soro, Bishop emeritus of Mar Addai of Toronto (since 2021)
- Emanuel Hana Shaleta, Bishop emeritus of Saint Peter the Apostle of San Diego (since March 2026)
- Shlemon Warduni, Auxiliary Bishop emeritus of Baghdad (since 2021)
- Mikha Pola Maqdassi, Auxiliary Bishop emeritus of Baghdad (since 2024)

Several sees are vacant: Archeparchy of Ahwaz, Archeparchy of Urmia, Eparchy of Cairo and Eparchy of Saint Thomas the Apostle of Sydney

=== Religious order ===
The Daughters of Mary Immaculate (or Chaldean Sisters) is a Chaldean Catholic apostolic order with patriarchal rights, established in Baghdad on August 7, 1922, during the reign of Patriarch Mar Youssef Emmanuel II Thomas. This order of Chaldean Sisters was founded by Father Anton Zebouni, born on January 17, 1883, in Mosul, Iraq. Zebouni was ordained a priest on May 15, 1907, by Patriarch Emmanuel II Toma. In the aftermath of World War I, many in Iraq faced poverty and hardship. Father Zebouni, moved by the difficult conditions, sought to create a congregation for women to support the Chaldean community. With permission from the Patriarch, the congregation was established and dedicated to Mary Immaculate. The order's mission includes a life of contemplative unity with God. The sisters engage in apostolic work and prayer, seeking to discover and follow God's will for the salvation of souls.

The Chaldean Sisters initially aimed to address the crisis of homeless Chaldean youth. In 1927, they founded an orphanage in Baghdad, which was later relocated because of security issues. The orphanage eventually settled in Alqosh. Over the years, the congregation has grown to nearly 100 sisters serving in various locations, including Iraq, Lebanon, Rome, Australia, the United Arab Emirates, Detroit, Chicago, Arizona, Turlock, and San Diego.

The Chaldean Sisters have been instrumental in various educational and social services, including running schools, orphanages, and retirement homes. Their commitment to education and social service has had a significant impact on the communities they serve. In 2022, the Chaldean Sisters celebrated their 100th anniversary with a fundraiser event to support their education expenses and the formation and novitiate home in Farmington Hills, Michigan.

The order is known for its dedication to prayer, community life, and service, guided by its motto, "With Mary to the Highest", emphasizing humility and dedication in their service. The Chaldean Sisters continue to be a vital part of the Chaldean Catholic community, contributing to the spiritual and social well-being of the people they serve.

=== Liturgy ===
The Chaldean Catholic Church uses the East Syriac Rite. A slight reform of the liturgy was effective since January 6, 2007, and it aimed to unify the many different uses of each parish, to remove centuries-old additions that merely imitated the Roman Rite, and for pastoral reasons. The main elements of the reform were the Anaphora being said aloud by the priest, the return to the ancient architecture of the churches, and the restoration of the ancient practice whereby the bread and wine are readied before a service begins.

=== International diaspora ===
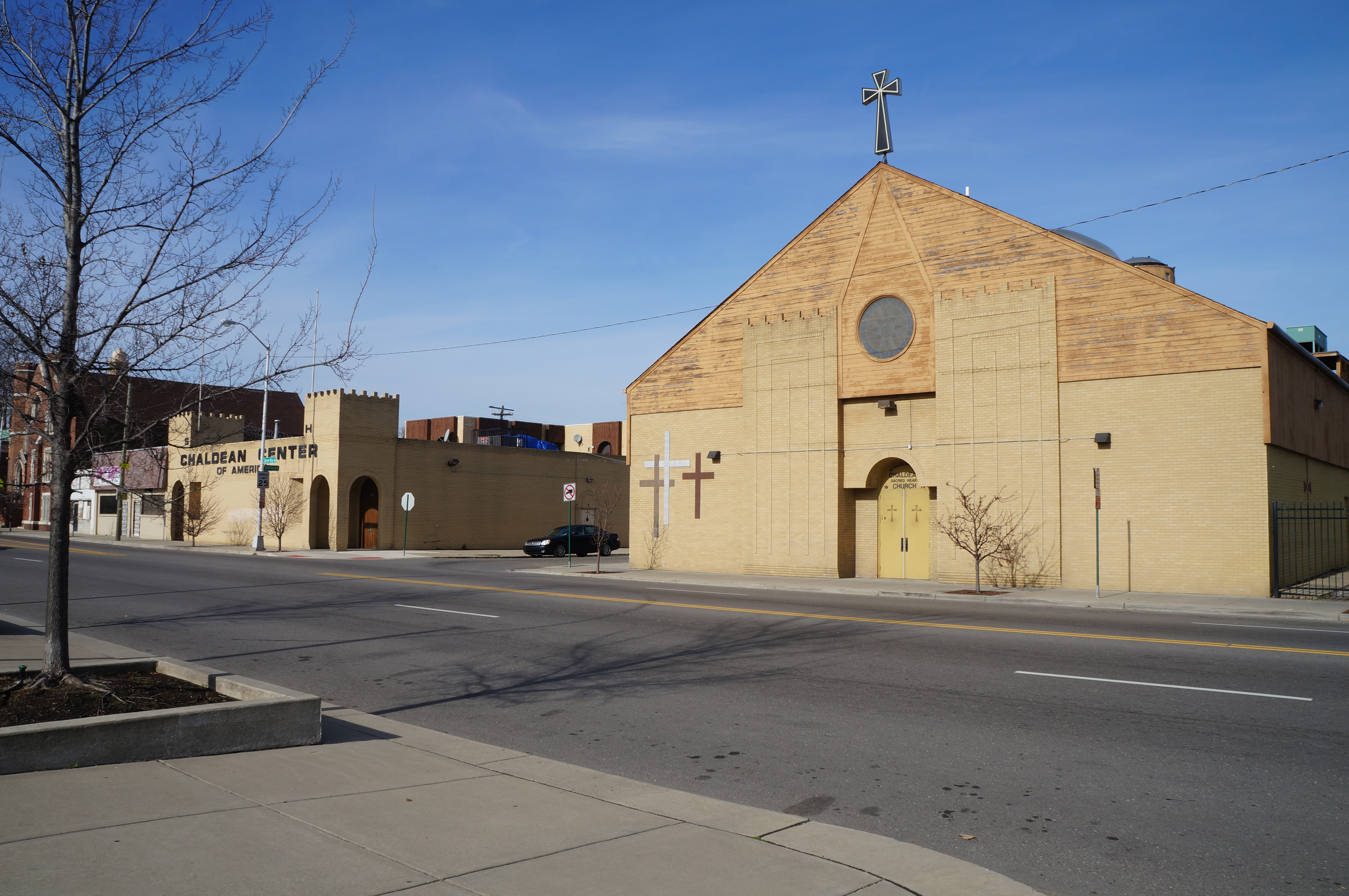
A historic church and community center built in Chaldean Town, an Assyrian diaspora neighborhood in Detroit

There are many Chaldean Assyrians in diaspora in the Western world, primarily in the American states of Michigan, Illinois and California.

In 2006, the Eparchy of Oceania, with the title of 'St Thomas the Apostle of Sydney of the Chaldeans' was set up with jurisdiction including the Chaldean Catholic communities of Australia and New Zealand. Its first Bishop, named by Pope Benedict XVI on October 21, 2006, was Archbishop Djibrail (Jibrail) Kassab, until this date, Archbishop of Bassorah in Iraq.

There has been a large immigration to the United States particularly to West Bloomfield and Oakland County in Southeast Michigan. Although the largest population resides in Southeast Michigan, there are populations in parts of California and Arizona as well, which all fall under the Eparchy of Saint Thomas the Apostle of Detroit. In addition, Canada in recent years has shown growing communities in provinces such as Ontario.

In 2008, Bawai Soro of the Assyrian Church of the East and 1,000 Assyrian families were received into full communion with the Chaldean Catholic Church.

On Friday, June 10, 2011, Pope Benedict XVI erected a new Chaldean Catholic eparchy in Toronto, Ontario, Canada and named Archbishop Yohannan Zora, who has worked alongside four priests with Catholics in Toronto (the largest community of Chaldeans) for nearly 20 years and who was previously an ad hominem Archbishop (he will retain this rank as head of the eparchy) and the Archbishop of the Archdiocese (Archeparchy) of Ahvaz (since 1974). The new eparchy, or diocese, will be known as the Chaldean Catholic Eparchy of Mar Addai. There are 38,000 Chaldean Catholics in Canada. Archbishop Zora was born in Batnaya, Iraq, on March 15, 1939. He was ordained in 1962 and worked in Iraqi parishes before being transferred to Iran in 1969.

The 2006 Australian census counted a total of 4,498 Chaldean Catholics in Australia.

=== Ecumenical relations ===
The Church's relations with its fellow Assyrians in the Assyrian Church of the East have improved in recent years. In 1994, Pope John Paul II and Patriarch Dinkha IV of the Assyrian Church of the East signed a Common Christological Declaration. On July 20, 2001, the Holy See issued a document, in agreement with the Assyrian Church of the East, named Guidelines for admission to the Eucharist between the Chaldean Church and the Assyrian Church of the East, which confirmed also the validity of the Anaphora of Addai and Mari.

In 2015, while the patriarchate of the Assyrian Church of the East was vacant following the death of Dinkha IV, the Chaldean Patriarch Louis Raphaël I Sako proposed unifying the three modern patriarchates into a re-established Church of the East with a single Patriarch in full communion with the Pope. The Assyrian Church of the East respectfully declined this proposal citing "ecclesiological divergences still remaining" and proceeded with its election of a new patriarch.

== Adherents today ==
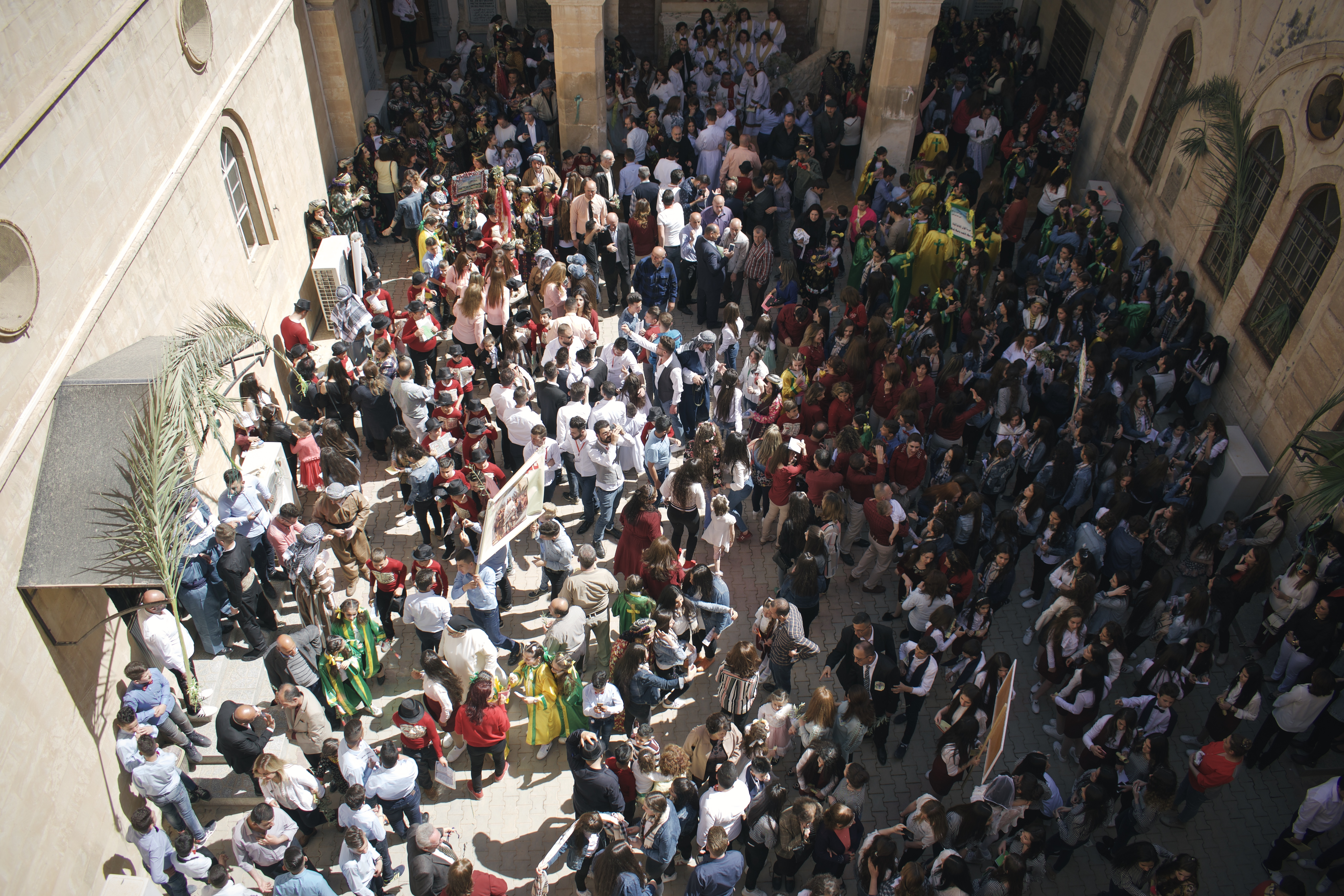
Chaldean Catholics from the town of Alqosh during a festival and parade for Palm Sunday 2018

Followers of the Chaldean Catholic Church often identify and are identified as "Chaldean" but, like adherents of the Syriac Orthodox Church, Syriac Catholic Church, Assyrian Church of the East and Ancient Church of the East who also live in or originate from Upper Mesopotamia, they are ethnic Assyrians and call themselves Suraye (Syriac: ܣܘܼܖ̈ܵܝܹܐ) in Neo-Aramaic. The Chaldean Catholics originated from ancient communities living in and indigenous to the northern Iraq/Mesopotamia, once known as Assyria (from the 25th century BC until the 7th century AD). Chaldean Catholics largely bear the same family and personal names, share the same genetic profile, hail from the same villages, towns and cities in northern Iraq, southeastern Turkey, northeastern Syria and northwestern Iran, as their neighbours of other religious denominations. The Chaldean Neo-Aramaic, Assyrian Neo-Aramaic and Surayt/Turoyo languages do not run parallel to the often associated religious denominations (Chaldean Catholic Church, Assyrian Church of the East, Syriac Orthodox Church).

In 1908, before the Assyrian genocide, the dissolution of the Ottoman Empire and the creation of new states in the Middle East such as Iraq, an article in the Catholic Encyclopedia states: "Strictly, the name of Chaldeans is no longer correct; in Chaldea proper, apart from Baghdad, there are now very few adherents of this rite, most of the Chaldean population being found in the cities of Kirkuk, Erbil, and Mosul, in the heart of the Tigris valley, in the valley of the Zab, and in the mountains of Kurdistan. It is in the former ecclesiastical province of Ator (Assyria) that are now found the most flourishing of the Catholic Chaldean communities. The native population accepts the name of Atoraya-Kaldaya (Assyro-Chaldeans), while in the neo-Syriac vernacular Christians generally are known as Syrians." The subsequent upheaval produced both an exodus, in particular but not only from what is now Turkey to other countries, and a more urbanized Chaldean Church within Iraq.

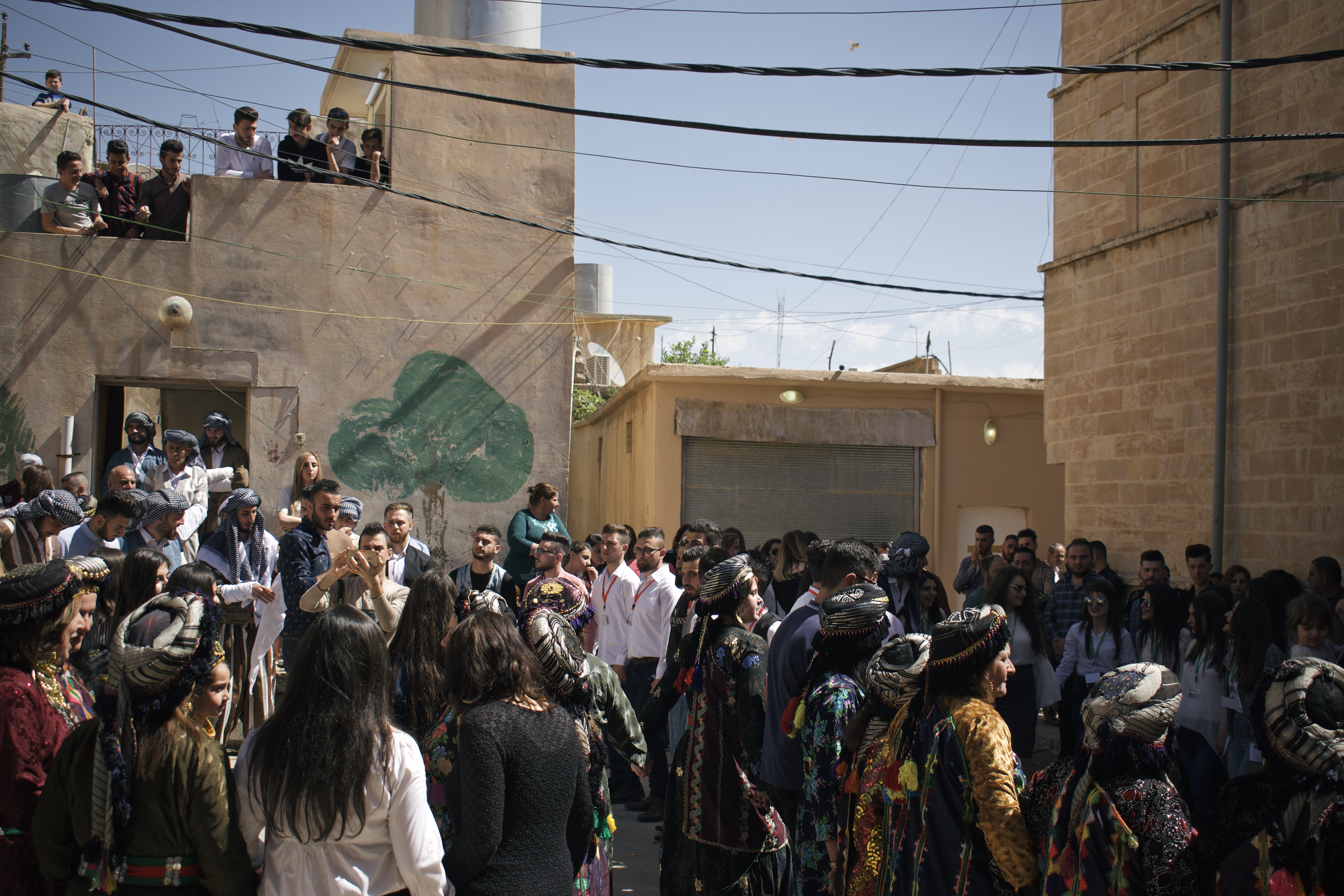
Chaldean Catholics wearing traditional clothes during Palm Sunday 2018 in Alqosh

While the Chaldean Catholic Church is predominantly Assyrian, the church has taken a stance of separating its adherents from Assyrian identity in the past. Such stances have often been detrimental to the political situation of Chaldean Catholics living in Iraq, and have threatened previous actions such as the Common Christological Declaration. In 2017, the Chaldean Catholic Church issued an official statement of its Synod of Bishops, the body that is exclusively competent to make laws for the entire church and that is its tribunal that it sets store on the distinct Chaldean identity, which is recognized in the Constitution of Iraq. It also declared:

"As a genuine Chaldean people, we officially reject the labels that distort our Chaldean identity, such as the composite name “Chaldean Syriac Assyrian” used in the Kurdistan Region, contrary to the name established in the Iraqi constitution. We call upon our daughters and sons to reject these labels, to adhere to their Chaldean identity without fanaticism, and to respect the other names such as ‘Assyrians’, ‘Syriacs’, and ‘Arameans’. We call upon the authorities in the region to respect them, and we encourage our Chaldeans to cooperate with everyone for the common good and not to split into unidentified groups or follow illusory projects that harm Christians. We also encourage them to engage in public affairs and in the political process as genuine partners of this blessed land, and to play their role alongside their fellow citizens in building a modern and strong civil country that befits their country's civilization and glory, a country that respects the rights and equality of all. We also express our support for the Chaldean League which seeks to establish links between the Chaldeans around the world."

Many Chaldean Catholic Assyrians have since migrated to Western countries, where they form a large diaspora community. The most recent reasons for migration are religious persecution, ethnic persecution, poor economic conditions during the sanctions against Iraq, and poor security conditions after the 2003 invasion. At least 20,000 of them fled through Lebanon to seek resettlement in Europe and the United States. As political changes sweep through many Arab nations, Assyrians have expressed concern about the developments and their future in the region.

== Internal scandals in the Church ==
The Chaldean Catholic Church is experiencing a profound leadership crisis, highlighted by recent events in July 2024. Five bishops, led by Archbishop Bashar Warda, boycotted the mandatory Chaldean Church Synod. This act of defiance was followed by their withdrawal from an August spiritual retreat and the removal of their students from the Chaldean Seminary. Cardinal Louis Sako, deeply concerned about the integrity of the Church, viewed these actions as a "serious breach" of ecclesial unity. In an effort to restore harmony, Cardinal Sako issued an ultimatum on August 28, 2024, requesting a public apology from the dissenting bishops by September 5 that year. However, Archbishop Warda and his allies remained defiant, refusing to apologize and criticizing Sako's leadership. Faced with this continued resistance, Cardinal Sako has considered canonical sanctions, including the possibility of excommunication, to safeguard the Church's unity. In September 2024, Sako reported the five bishops, including Warda, directly to Pope Francis.

The bitter feud between Cardinal Louis Sako and Archbishop Bashar Warda has escalated into a personal vendetta, with Sako accusing Warda of scheming to seize control of the patriarchate. Sako perceives Warda as a conniving opportunist, manoeuvring to position himself as the next patriarch. This perception of Warda's ruthless power play has forced Sako to abandon his retirement plans and protect the Chaldean Catholic Church, despite his previous commitment to step down at 75.

Louis Sako, Head of the Chaldean Catholic Church, asserts that the current Archbishop of Erbil, Bashar Warda, is conspired with Rayan al-Kildani, leader of the Babylon Movement, in an attempt to subvert his power and encourage his removal from his position. In addition, Warda is criticized for supporting al-Kildani despite the severe human rights abuses committed by his movement, including looting homes, land seizures, intimidation, extortion, abuse of women, persecution of minorities, and torture of detainees. The U.S. has imposed sanctions on al-Kildani due to these abuses, including penalizing entities that engage with him. Sako has referred to Warda as the Godfather of the Babylon Movement, while Warda places his benefits from al-Kildani above the church's interests and needs.

Louis Sako, along with Christian members of the Iraqi Parliament, has declared that the Iranian-backed Babylon Movement is not genuinely Christian but rather using the label for political gain. Despite claiming to represent Christians, the majority of its members and voters are Shia Muslims. However, Archbishop Bashar Warda still promotes their influence.

== See also ==
- Catholic University in Erbil
- Eastern Catholic Churches
- List of Chaldean Catholic patriarchs of Baghdad
- Liturgy of Addai and Mari
- Syriac Christianity
- Syro-Malabar Church
- The Last Assyrians – 2004 French documentary film about Chaldean Catholic Christians

== Sources ==
- Assemani, Giuseppe Simone (1719). Bibliotheca orientalis clementino-vaticana. Vol. 1. Roma.
- Assemani, Giuseppe Luigi (1775). De catholicis seu patriarchis Chaldaeorum et Nestorianorum commentarius historico-chronologicus. Roma.
- Assemani, Giuseppe Luigi (2004). History of the Chaldean and Nestorian patriarchs. Piscataway, New Jersey: Gorgias Press.
- Becchetti, Filippo Angelico (1796). Istoria degli ultimi quattro secoli della Chiesa. Vol. 10. Roma.
- Badger, George Percy (1852). The Nestorians and Their Rituals. Vol. 1. London: Joseph Masters.
- Badger, George Percy (1852). The Nestorians and Their Rituals. Vol. 2. London: Joseph Masters. ISBN 9780790544823.
- Baum, Wilhelm; Winkler, Dietmar W. (2003). The Church of the East: A Concise History. London-New York: Routledge-Curzon. ISBN 9781134430192.
- Baumer, Christoph (2006). The Church of the East: An Illustrated History of Assyrian Christianity. London-New York: Tauris. ISBN 9781845111151.
- Becchetti, Filippo Angelico (1796). Istoria degli ultimi quattro secoli della Chiesa. Vol. 10. Roma.
- Beltrami, Giuseppe (1933). La Chiesa Caldea nel secolo dell'Unione. Roma: Pontificium Institutum Orientalium Studiorum. ISBN 9788872102626.
- Borbone, Pier Giorgio (2014). "The Chaldean Business: The Beginnings of East Syriac Typography and the Profession of Faith of Patriarch Elias". Miscellanea Bibliothecae Apostolicae Vaticanae. 20: 211–258.
- Burleson, Samuel; Rompay, Lucas van (2011). "List of Patriarchs of the Main Syriac Churches in the Middle East". Gorgias Encyclopedic Dictionary of the Syriac Heritage. Piscataway, NJ: Gorgias Press. pp. 481–491.
- Chabot, Jean-Baptiste (1896). "Éttat religieux des diocèses formant le patriarcat chaldéen de Babylone". Revue de l'Orient chrétien. 1: 433–453.
- Chaumont, Marie-Louise (1988). La Christianisation de l'Empire Iranien: Des origines aux grandes persécutions du ive siècle. Louvain: Peeters. ISBN 9789042905405.
- "The Eastern Catholic Churches 2016. Source: Annuario Pontificio" (PDF). CNEWA. 2016. pp. 3–4.
- Robson, Laura (May 18, 2016). Minorities and the Modern Arab World: New Perspectives. Syracuse University Press. pp. 266–. ISBN 978-0-8156-5355-4.
- Fiey, Jean Maurice (1967). "Les étapes de la prise de conscience de son identité patriarcale par l'Église syrienne orientale". L'Orient Syrien. 12: 3–22.
- Fiey, Jean Maurice (1970). Jalons pour une histoire de l'Église en Iraq. Louvain: Secretariat du CSCO.
- Fiey, Jean Maurice (1979) [1963]. Communautés syriaques en Iran et Irak des origines à 1552. London: Variorum Reprints. ISBN 9780860780519.
- Fiey, Jean Maurice (1993). Pour un Oriens Christianus Novus: Répertoire des diocèses syriaques orientaux et occidentaux. Beirut: Orient-Institut. ISBN 9783515057189.
- Frazee, Charles A. (2006) [1983]. Catholics and Sultans: The Church and the Ottoman Empire 1453–1923. Cambridge: Cambridge University Press. ISBN 9780521027007.
- Giamil, Samuel (1902). Genuinae relationes inter Sedem Apostolicam et Assyriorum orientalium seu Chaldaeorum ecclesiam. Roma: Ermanno Loescher.
- Gulik, Wilhelm van (1904). "Die Konsistorialakten über die Begründung des uniert-chaldäischen Patriarchates von Mosul unter Papst Julius III" (PDF). Oriens Christianus. 4: 261–277.
- Habbi, Joseph (1966). "Signification de l'union chaldéenne de Mar Sulaqa avec Rome en 1553". L'Orient Syrien. 11: 99–132, 199–230.
- Habbi, Joseph (1971a). "L'unification de la hiérarchie chaldéenne dans la première moitié du XIXe siècle" (PDF). Parole de l'Orient. 2 (1): 121–143. Archived from the original (PDF) on June 19, 2021.
- Habbi, Joseph (1971b). "L'unification de la hiérarchie chaldéenne dans la première moitié du XIXe siècle (Suite)" (PDF). Parole de l'Orient. 2 (2): 305–327. Archived from the original (PDF) on June 19, 2021.
- Hage, Wolfgang (2007). Das orientalische Christentum. Stuttgart: Kohlhammer Verlag. ISBN 9783170176683.
- Hartmann, Klaus-Peter (1980). Untersuchungen zur Sozialgeographie christlicher Minderheiten im Vorderen Orient. Wiesbaden: Reichert. ISBN 9783882260809.
- Hill, Henry, ed. (1988). Light from the East: A Symposium on the Oriental Orthodox and Assyrian Churches. Toronto: Anglican Book Centre. ISBN 9780919891906.
- Jakob, Joachim (2014). Ostsyrische Christen und Kurden im Osmanischen Reich des 19. und frühen 20. Jahrhunderts. Münster: LIT Verlag. ISBN 9783643506160.
- Joseph, John B. (2000). The Modern Assyrians of the Middle East: A History of Their Encounter with Western Christian Missions, Archaeologists, and Colonial Powers. Leiden: Brill. ISBN 9004116419.
- Labourt, Jérôme (1908). "Note sur les schismes de l'Église nestorienne, du XVIe au XIXe siècle". Journal Asiatique. 11: 227–235.
- Lampart, Albert (1966). Ein Märtyrer der Union mit Rom: Joseph I. 1681–1696, Patriarch der Chaldäer. Einsiedeln: Benziger Verlag.
- Lemmens, Leonhard (1926). "Relationes nationem Chaldaeorum inter et Custodiam Terrae Sanctae (1551–1629)". Archivum Franciscanum Historicum. 19: 17–28.
- Marthaler, Berard L., ed. (2003). "Chaldean Catholic Church (Eastern Catholic)". The New Catholic Encyclopedia. Vol. 3. Thompson-Gale. pp. 366–369.
- Murre van den Berg, Heleen (1999). "The Patriarchs of the Church of the East from the Fifteenth to Eighteenth Centuries" (PDF). Hugoye: Journal of Syriac Studies. 2 (2): 235–264. doi:10.31826/hug-2010-020119. S2CID 212688640.
- Murre van den Berg, Heleen (2008). "Classical Syriac, Neo-Aramaic, and Arabic in the Church of the East and the Chaldean Church between 1500 and 1800". Aramaic in Its Historical and Linguistic Setting. Wiesbaden: Harrassowitz Verlag. pp. 335–352. ISBN 9783447057875.
- Nichols, Aidan (2010) [1992]. Rome and the Eastern Churches: A Study in Schism (2nd revised ed.). San Francisco: Ignatius Press. ISBN 9781586172824.
- Nisan, M. (2002). Minorities in the Middle East: A History of Struggle for Self Expression. Jefferson: McFarland & Company. Archived from the original on September 13, 2006.
- O’Mahony, Anthony (2006). "Syriac Christianity in the modern Middle East". In Angold, Michael (ed.). The Cambridge History of Christianity: Eastern Christianity. Vol. 5. Cambridge: Cambridge University Press. pp. 511–536. ISBN 9780521811132.
- Outerbridge, Leonard M. (1952). The lost churches of China. Philadelphia: Westminster Press.
- Roberson, Ronald (1999) [1986]. The Eastern Christian Churches: A Brief Survey (6th ed.). Roma: Orientalia Christiana. ISBN 9788872103210.
- Tfinkdji, Joseph (1914). "L' église chaldéenne catholique autrefois et aujourd'hui". Annuaire Pontifical Catholique. 17: 449–525.
- Tisserant, Eugène (1931). "Église nestorienne". Dictionnaire de théologie catholique. Vol. 11. pp. 157–323.
- Travis, Hannibal (2010) [2007]. Genocide in the Middle East: The Ottoman Empire, Iraq, and Sudan. Durham, NC: Carolina Academic Press. pp. 237–77, 293–294. ISBN 9781594604362.
- Vine, Aubrey R. (1937). The Nestorian Churches. London: Independent Press.
- Vosté, Jacques Marie (1925). "Missio duorum fratrum Melitensium O. P. in Orientem saec. XVI et relatio, nunc primum edita, eorum quae in istis regionibus gesserunt". Analecta Ordinis Praedicatorum. 33 (4): 261–278.
- Vosté, Jacques Marie (1928). "Catalogue de la bibliothèque syro-chaldéenne du couvent de Notre-Dame des Semences près d'Alqoš (Iraq)". Angelicum. 5: 3–36, 161–194, 325–358, 481–498.
- Vosté, Jacques Marie (1930). "Les inscriptions de Rabban Hormizd et de N.-D. des Semences près d'Alqoš (Iraq)". Le Muséon. 43: 263–316.
- Vosté, Jacques Marie (1931). "Mar Iohannan Soulaqa, premier Patriarche des Chaldéens, martyr de l'union avec Rome (†1555)". Angelicum. 8: 187–234.
- Wigram, William Ainger (1929). The Assyrians and Their Neighbours. London: G. Bell & Sons.
- Wilmshurst, David (2000). The Ecclesiastical Organisation of the Church of the East, 1318–1913. Louvain: Peeters Publishers. ISBN 9789042908765.
- Wilmshurst, David (2011). The Martyred Church: A History of the Church of the East. London: East & West Publishing Limited. ISBN 9781907318047.
- Zora, Subhi (1994). "Some Outstanding Events in the History of the Chaldean Christians of the East (1551–1992)". VI Symposium Syriacum 1992. Roma: Pontificium institutum studiorum orientalium. pp. 347–359. ISBN 9788872103050.
- Lukitz, Liora (2005). Iraq: The Search for National Identity. Routledge. ISBN 978-1-135-77821-7.
