= List of cathedrals in Iraq =

This is a list of cathedrals in Iraq sorted by denomination.

== Catholic Church ==
Cathedrals of the Armenian, Chaldean and Syriac Catholic Churches in Iraq:

- Chaldean Catholic Church:
  - Cathedral of St. Joseph (Mar Yousef), Baghdad (Chaldean Catholic Archeparchy of Baghdad/Chaldean Catholic Patriarchate of Baghdad)
  - Former Cathedral of Mary Mother of Sorrows, Baghdad (Chaldean Catholic Archeparchy of Baghdad/Chaldean Catholic Patriarchate of Baghdad)
  - Cathedral of St. George, Alquoch (Chaldean Catholic Eparchy of Alqosh)
  - Cathedral of St. Joseph. Ankawa, Erbil (Chaldean Catholic Archeparchy of Arbil)
  - Cathedral of Our Lady, Basrah (Chaldean Catholic Archeparchy of Basra)
  - Cathedral Mar Aeth Alaha, Duhok (Chaldean Catholic Eparchy of Duhok)
  - Cathedral of St. Mary (al-Tahira), Mosul (Chaldean Catholic Archeparchy of Mosul)
  - Pro-Cathedral of St. Paul, Mosul (Chaldean Catholic Archeparchy of Mosul)
  - Cathedral of the Sacred Heart, Kirkuk (Chaldean Catholic Archeparchy of Kirkuk-Sulaimaniya)
  - Cathedral of St. George, Zakho (Chaldean Catholic Eparchy of Zakho)
- Syriac Catholic Church
  - Sayidat al-Nejat Cathedral (Our Lady of Perpetual Help Cathedral), Baghdad
  - Cathedral of the Secred Heart, Basrah
  - Cathedral of Queen of Place, Erbil
  - St. Thomas Syriac Cathedral, Mosul
- Armenian Catholic Church
  - Cathedral of Our Lady of Nareg, Baghdad
- Melkite Catholic Church
  - Cathedral of St. Beorge and St. Nicholas, Baghdad
- Latin Church
  - Latin Cathedral of St. Joseph

== Syriac Orthodox Church ==
- Cathedral of Saint Peter and Saint Paul, Baghdad
- Saint Thomas Cathedral (Mor Tuma Cathedral), Mossul

The seat of the Archdiocese of Mar Matta is the Mor Matta Monastery, Bartella, Nineveh

== Assyrian Church of the East ==
- Mar Yohanna al-Ma’amadan Cathedral (St. John the Baptist Cathedral), Ankawa, Erbil
- St. Zay'ā Cathedral, Mechanics’ Quarter, Dora, Baghdad

== Ancient Church of the East ==
- Cathedral of Saint Mary, Baghdad
- Cathedral of Mar Youkhanan Ma’mdana (Saint John the Baptist Cathedral), Kirkuk
- Cathedral of the Virgin Mary, Mosul

== See also ==
- List of cathedrals
- Christianity in Iraq
