= Deaths in December 1999 =

The following is a list of notable deaths in December 1999.

Entries for each day are listed alphabetically by surname. A typical entry lists information in the following sequence:

- Name, age, country of citizenship at birth, subsequent country of citizenship (if applicable), reason for notability, cause of death (if known), and reference.

== December 1999 ==
=== 1 ===
- Gene Baker, 74, American baseball player (Chicago Cubs, Pittsburgh Pirates).
- Ctirad Benáček, 75, Czech Olympic basketball player (1948).
- Stephen Brooks, 57, American actor (The F.B.I., Days of Our Lives, The Interns), heart attack.
- Fritz Fischer, 91, German historian.
- Pop Gates, 82, American basketball player.
- Santidev Ghosh, 89, Indian author, singer, actor and dancer.
- Luigi Granelli, 70, Italian politician.
- Marilyn Harris, 75, American child actress (Frankenstein), cancer.
- Jaakko Jalas, 79, Finnish botanist.
- Tomás Pablo, 78, Chilean politician and architect.
- Victor Perlo, 87, American Marxist economist.
- Massimo Pupillo, 70, Italian film director.
- Alexander Tatarenko, 74, Soviet Russian painter and art teacher.

=== 2 ===
- Joey Adams, 88, American comedian, vaudevillian, radio host, and author.
- Mike Budnick, 80, American baseball player (New York Giants).
- Charlie Byrd, 74, American jazz guitarist, lung cancer.
- Matt Cohen, 56, Canadian writer, lung cancer.
- Giorgio Cristallini, 78, Italian screenwriter and film director.
- Daniel J. Elazar, 65, American professor of political science.
- Sami Kallunki, 28, Finnish Olympic skier (1992).
- Hilde Klusenwerth, 89, German Olympic hurdler (1936).
- Vladimir Kravtsov, 50, Soviet and Russian handball player and Olympic champion (1976, 1980).
- Ethelmary Oakland, 90, American child actress.
- Guillermo Obeid, 58 Argentine Olympic fencer (1968).
- Mike Ockrent, 53, British stage director.

=== 3 ===
- John Archer, 84, American actor (White Heat, Blue Hawaii, Lassie), lung cancer.
- Curtis Brown, 76, American baseball player.
- Enrique Cadícamo, 99, Argentine tango lyricist, poet and novelist, heart failure.
- Anne Francine, 82, American actress (Harper Valley PTA, Crocodile Dundee, All My Children) and cabaret singer, stroke.
- Conrad Hunte, 67, Barbadian cricketer, heart attack.
- Scatman John, 57, American jazz musician ("Scatman (Ski-Ba-Bop-Ba-Dop-Bop)", "Scatman's World") and poet, lung cancer.
- Madeline Kahn, 57, American actress (Young Frankenstein, Blazing Saddles, Clue), Tony winner (1993), ovarian cancer.
- Boris Kuznetsov, 71, Russian and Soviet football player and Olympian (1956).
- Horst Mahseli, 65, Polish footballer.
- Tami Mauriello, 76, American boxer and actor (On the Waterfront).
- Tuffy Nabors, 75, American football player (New York Yankees).
- Edmond Safra, 67, Lebanese Brazilian banker, smoke inhalation injury.
- Walter Schleger, 70, Austrian football player.
- Jarl Wahlström, 81, Finnish salvationist, 12th General of the Salvation Army.

=== 4 ===
- Heinrich C. Berann, 84, Austrian painter and cartographer.
- Rose Bird, 63, American first female justice, breast cancer.
- Charlotte H. Bruner, 82, American scholar.
- Sylvester Clarke, 44, West Indian cricketer, heart attack.
- Slobodan Dimitrijević, 58, Serbian television and film actor.
- Bert Hoffmeister, 92, Canadian Army officer, businessman, and conservationist.
- Nilde Iotti, 79, Italian politician of the Communist Party, heart attack.
- Barry Mahon, 78, American film director, cinematographer and producer.
- Daishōhō Masami, 32, Japanese sumo wrestler, pancreatic cancer.
- Henry Nicoll, 91, British Olympic equestrian (1948).
- Susan Partridge, 69, British tennis player.
- John Douglas Pringle, 87, Australian journalist.
- Nélida Roca, 70, Argentinian showbusiness diva and sex symbol, heart attack.
- Edward Vesala, 54, Finnish avant-garde jazz drummer, congestive heart failure.
- Alick Walker, 74, British palaeontologist.

=== 5 ===
- Claude Ballot-Léna, 63, French racing driver, cancer.
- Edvin Biuković, 30, Croatian comics artist, brain tumor.
- Joseph Andorfer Ewan, 90, American botanist, naturalist, and historian of botany and natural history.
- Lajos Faluvégi, 75, Hungarian politician.
- Nathan Jacobson, 89, Polish-American mathematician.
- Ellwood Madill, 84, Canadian politician, member of the House of Commons of Canada, (1963-1968, 1972-1974).
- Bobby Marchan, 69, American R&B singer-songwriter, liver cancer.
- Edoardo Martino, 89, Italian politician.
- Bohumil Musil, 77, Czech football player and manager.
- Masaru Sato, 71, Japanese film composer (The Hidden Fortress, Throne of Blood, Yojimbo).
- Freddie Shepard, 83, American baseball player.
- Kendall Taylor, 94, British pianist.

=== 6 ===
- Paul Bacon, 92, French politician.
- Alexander Baron, 82, British author and screenwriter.
- Gwyn Jones, 92, Welsh novelist and story writer.
- Günther Pankoke, 74, German cyclist.
- Martha Sharp, 94, American unitarian.
- Robert A. Swanson, American venture capitalist, brain cancer.
- Roy Talcott, 79, American baseball player (Boston Braves).
- Stan Wallace, 68, American gridiron football player (Chicago Bears).

=== 7 ===
- Kenny Baker, 78, British jazz musician.
- Charlie Greer, 53, American football player (Denver Broncos).
- Darling Légitimus, 92, French actress.
- Alfons Moog, 84, German football player.
- William Wiley, 68, South African cricket player.

=== 8 ===
- Ernst Günther, 66, Swedish actor and director, diabetes.
- Rupert Hart-Davis, 92, English publisher.
- Wally Hebert, 92, American baseball player (St. Louis Browns, Pittsburgh Pirates).
- František Ipser, 72, Czech football manager and player.
- Péter Kuczka, 76, Hungarian writer, poet and science fiction editor.
- Everett Carll Ladd, 62, American political scientist, heart failure.
- Ange Le Strat, 81, French racing cyclist.
- Pupella Maggio, 89, Italian film actress, cerebral hemorrhage.
- Kjell Moe, 90, Norwegian footballer.
- Richard P. Powell, 91, American novelist.
- Antônio Dias dos Santos, 51, Brazilian football player.
- Néstor Togneri, 57, Argentine football player.

=== 9 ===
- Tage Jørgensen, 81, Danish Olympic fencer (1948).
- Oudom Khattigna, 68, Laotian communist politician, Vice President (1998-1999).
- Whitey Kurowski, 81, American baseball player (St. Louis Cardinals).
- Yakov Rylsky, 71, Soviet sabre fencer and Olympic champion (1956, 1960, 1964), liver cirrhosis.
- Shinkichi Takemura, 67, Japanese Olympic speed skater (1956, 1960).
- Cecil H. Williamson, 90, British screenwriter, editor and film director.

=== 10 ===
- Charles Assalé, 88, Cameroonian politician.
- Antonio Blanco, 87, Spanish and American painter, heart and kidney disease.
- Rick Danko, 55, Canadian musician (The Band), heart failure.
- Pietro De Vico, 88, Italian film actor, stroke.
- Ed Dorn, 70, American poet, pancreatic cancer.
- Lex Goudsmit, 86, Dutch actor, stroke.
- Shirley Hemphill, 52, American comedian and actress (What's Happening!!), renal failure.
- Orlando Lanza, 67, Cuban Olympic rower (1956).
- Jean-Claude Michel, 74, French actor and voice actor.
- Mike Randall, 80, British journalist and editor.
- Niccolò Tucci, 91, Short story writer and novelist.
- Franjo Tuđman, 77, Croatian politician, President of Croatia (since 1990), cancer.

=== 11 ===
- Howard Bagguley, 90, Canadian Olympic skier (1932).
- Charles Earland, 58, American jazz organist, heart failure.
- Enrica Follieri, 73, Italian philologist and paleographer.
- Ed Jones, 87, American politician, member of the United States House of Representatives (1969-1989).
- Jack Oldfield, 100, British landowner and politician.
- Harry Wüstenhagen, 71, German film actor.
- Hans K. Ziegler, 88, German-American satellite engineer.

=== 12 ===
- John Badaczewski, 77, American football player.
- James Balfour, 71, Canadian politician.
- Huelet Benner, 82, American multi-discipline pistol shooter and Olympic champion (1948, 1952, 1956).
- Paul Cadmus, 94, American artist.
- Gordon Chater, 77, English Australian comedian and actor.
- Gaston Diehl, 87, French professor of art history and an art critic.
- Joseph Heller, 76, American novelist (Catch-22), heart attack.
- Ladislav Józsa, 51, Slovak football player.
- Matty Kemp, 92, American film actor.
- Luz Oliveros-Belardo, 93, Filipina pharmaceutical chemist.
- Ignacio Quirós, 68, Argentine actor, cancer.
- Leo Smit, 78, American composer and pianist, heart failure.
- John W. R. Taylor, 77, British aviation expert.
- Claes Thelander, 83, Swedish actor.

=== 13 ===
- Peter Adams, 61, New Zealand-Australian actor, cancer.
- Jill Craigie, 88, English documentary film director, screenwriter and feminist, heart failure.
- Stane Dolanc, 74, Yugoslav communist politician, cerebral stroke.
- Maury Gertsman, 92, American cinematographer.
- Tarmo Uusivirta, 42, Finnish professional boxer and Olympian (1980), suicide.
- Robert Wagenhoffer, 39, American figure skater, complications of AIDS.
- Ian Watt, 82, English literary critic and academic.
- Lady Mary Whitley, 75, British noblewoman.

=== 14 ===
- Sven Berlin, 88, English painter, writer and sculptor.
- Sándor Holczreiter, 53, Hungarian weightlifter and Olympic medalist (1972).
- Douglas Leigh, 92, American advertising executive.
- Walt Levinsky, 70, American big band player, composer, arranger and bandleader, brain cancer.
- J. W. Lockett, 62, American football player.
- Héctor Martínez, 60, Cuban baseball player (Kansas City Athletics).

=== 15 ===
- Georges Aeby, 86, Swiss football player.
- Rune Andréasson, 74, Swedish comic creator, cancer.
- Francis L. K. Hsu, 90, Chinese-American anthropologist.
- Eddie Kazak, 79, American baseball player (St. Louis Cardinals, Cincinnati Reds).
- León Martinetti, 73, Argentine Olympic basketball player (1948).
- Benny Russell, 55, American football player (Buffalo Bills).

=== 16 ===
- Henry Helstoski, 74, American politician, member of the United States House of Representatives (1965-1977).
- Dorit Kreysler, 90, Austrian film actress.
- Ruth Welting, 51, American operatic soprano.
- Jorge Tuero, Venezuelan television actor and comedian, killed during the Vargas tragedy.

=== 17 ===
- Rex Allen, 78, American actor and singer-songwriter, traffic accident.
- Leo P. Carlin, 91, American politician.
- Ken W. Clawson, 63, American journalist and spokesman for U.S. President Richard Nixon, heart attack.
- Paolo Dezza, 98, Italian Jesuit cardinal of the Catholic church.
- François Dyrek, 66, French actor, heart attack.
- James Ginty, 91, British middle-distance runner and Olympian (1936).
- Rufus Lewis, 80, American baseball pitcher.
- Jürgen Moser, 71, German-American mathematician.
- Grover Washington, Jr., 56, American jazz saxophonist, heart attack.
- C. Vann Woodward, 91, American historian and Pulitzer Prize winner.

=== 18 ===
- Þór Beck, 59, Icelandic footballer.
- Jan Bouwman, 64, Dutch Olympic swimmer (1960).
- Robert Bresson, 98, French film director.
- Robert Dougall, 86, English broadcaster and ornithologist.
- Joe Higgs, 59, Jamaican reggae musician, cancer.
- Dennis W. Sciama, 73, British physicist.
- John Southgate, 73, British Anglican priest.
- Benito Stefanelli, 71, Italian film actor, stuntman and weapons master.
- Bertha Swirles, 96, British physicist.
- Logan Wright, 66, American pediatric psychologist, heart attack.
- Armenak Yaltyryan, 85, Soviet Armenian wrestler and Olympian (1952).

=== 19 ===
- Bal Dani, 66, Indian cricket player.
- Brendan Hansen, 77, Australian politician.
- Jim Lecture, 75, American football player (Buffalo Bisons).
- Desmond Llewelyn, 85, Welsh actor (From Russia with Love, Chitty Chitty Bang Bang, Follyfoot), traffic collision.
- Hans Wiltschek, 88, Austrian Olympic boxer (1936).
- Marion Worth, 69, American country music singer, complications of emphysema.

=== 20 ===
- Wazir Ali, 71, Pakistani Olympic cyclist (1948).
- Dick Bertell, 64, American baseball player (Chicago Cubs, San Francisco Giants), influenza.
- Riccardo Freda, 90, Italian film director.
- Mario Carreño Morales, 86, Cuban painter.
- Carin Nilsson, 95, Swedish freestyle swimmer and Olympic medalist (1920).
- Irving Rapper, 101, American film director.
- Hank Snow, 85, Canadian country musician, heart failure.
- Guy Van Den Steen, 93, Belgian sculptor.
- James Wainwright, 61, American actor.

=== 21 ===
- John Arnatt, 82, British actor.
- Bill Edwards, 81, American actor, rodeo rider, and artist.
- Michael P. Malone, 59, American historian, cardiomyopathy, heart attack.
- Hisashi Ouchi, 35, Japanese nuclear power technician, multiple organ failure due to radiation exposure.
- Bernard Smith, 92, American literary editor, film producer and literary critic.
- Frank Stanley, 77, American cinematographer (Magnum Force, 10, Grease 2).
- Jalil Ziapour, 79, Iranian painter and academic.

=== 22 ===
- Per Aabel, 97, Norwegian actor, artist, dancer and choreographer.
- Hans Frankenthal, 73, German Holocaust survivor.
- Tamara Lees, 75, English film actress.
- Ola Oni, 66, Nigerian political economist, socialist and human right activist.
- Louis Pohl, 84, American painter, illustrator, printmaker and cartoonist.
- Yousif Thomas, 65, Iraqi-born Chaldean Catholic hierarch, archbishop of Basra (1983–1995) and archbishop-bishop of Beirut (since 1995).
- Benny Quick, 55, German pop and schlager singer, suicide.

=== 23 ===
- Martin Charteris, Baron Charteris of Amisfield, 86, British Army officer and courtier of Queen Elizabeth II.
- John Paton Davies, Jr., 91, American diplomat and Medal of Freedom recipient.
- Wallace Diestelmeyer, 73, Canadian figure skater and Olympic medalist (1948).
- Timur Gaidar, 73, Russian rear admiral, writer and journalist.
- Silvio Gava, 98, Italian politician.
- Lois Hamilton, 56, American actress (Summer Rental, The Ropers, The Cannonball Run), suicide by drug overdose.
- Miroslav Ivanov, 70, Popular Czech nonfiction writer.
- Vladimir Kondrashin, 70, Russian basketball player and coach.
- Marcel Landowski, 84, French composer, biographer and arts administrator.
- Billy McGlen, 78, English football player.
- Peter Raper, 70, Australian Olympic rower (1956).
- Eirene White, Baroness White, 90, British politician and journalist.

=== 24 ===
- Kadathanat Madhavi Amma, 90, Indian Malayalam poet, novelist and short story writer.
- Tomasz Beksiński, 41, Polish radio presenter, suicide.
- Peter Boroffka, 67, German politician and member of the Bundestag.
- Bill Bowerman, 88, American track and field coach and co-founder of Nike, Inc.
- Reggie Carter, 42, American basketball player (New York Knicks).
- Billy Davenport, 68, American drummer.
- Maurice Couve de Murville, 92, French politician, 152nd Prime Minister of France.
- Dušan Drška, 46, Slovak Olympic weightlifter (1976, 1980).
- João Figueiredo, 81, 30th President of Brazil, cardiovascular disease.
- Tito Guízar, 91, American singer and actor, pneumonia.
- Jiang Hua, 92, President of the Supreme Court of China.
- Irenio Jara, 70, Chilean Olympic footballer (1952).
- Joseph McGahn, 82, American politician.
- William C. Schneider, 76, American aerospace engineer and NASA mission director.
- John Malach Shaw, 68, American district judge (United States District Court for the Western District of Louisiana).
- Grete Stern, 95, German-Argentine photographer.

=== 25 ===
- Rafael Barretto, 68, Filipino basketball player and Olympian (1956).
- Arne Ileby, 86, Norwegian football player and Olympian (1936).
- Peter Jeffrey, 70, English actor, prostate cancer.
- Zully Moreno, 79, Argentine film actress, Alzheimer's disease.
- Michael Bamidele Otiko, 65, Nigerian politician and educator.
- Alfonso Lastras Ramírez, 75, Mexican lawyer and politician.

=== 26 ===
- Benny Bartlett, 75, American child actor and musician.
- Vitold Belevitch, 78, Belgian mathematician and electrical engineer.
- Bob Borrie, 72, Canadian politician, member of the House of Commons of Canada (1968-1972).
- Ola Skjåk Bræk, 87, Norwegian banker and politician.
- Prunella Clough, 80, British artist, cancer.
- Fred Draper, 74, American actor (Faces, A Woman Under the Influence, Columbo).
- David Duncan, 86, American screenwriter and novelist.
- Leah Leneman, 55, American historian and cookery writer.
- Curtis Mayfield, 57, American singer-songwriter ("Superfly", "Move On Up", "Freddie's Dead") and record producer, complications from diabetes.
- Lance Pugh, 80, Canadian Olympic cyclist (1948).
- Rajaratnam Selvanayagam, 77-78, Malaysian Olympic field hockey player (1956).
- Shankar Dayal Sharma, 81, 9th president of India, heart attack.

=== 27 ===
- Leslie Brown, 87, British Anglican prelate.
- Pierre Clémenti, 57, French actor, liver cancer.
- Sture Frölén, 92, Swedish architect.
- Leonard Goldenson, 94, American TV and radio executive.
- Michael McDowell, 49, American novelist and screenwriter (Beetlejuice, The Nightmare Before Christmas, Thinner), AIDS-related illness.
- Dick Peabody, 74, American actor, prostate cancer.
- Horst Matthai Quelle, 87, German philosopher.

=== 28 ===
- Josephine Barnes, 87, English obstetrician and gynaecologist.
- Joachim Böhmer, 59, East German rower and Olympic medalist (1972).
- Helen Boughton-Leigh, 93, American Olympic alpine skier (1936).
- Franco Castellano, 74, Italian screenwriter and film director.
- Donald Cotton, 71, British writer for radio and television.
- Louis Féraud, 78, French fashion designer and artist, Alzheimer's disease.
- Kenneth Hudson, 83, British journalist and broadcaster.
- Larry Dale Lee, 41, American financial and economic journalist, stabbed.
- Louisette Malherbaud, 82, French Olympic fencer (1948).
- Clayton Moore, 85, American actor (The Lone Ranger), heart attack.
- Harry Monty, 95, American actor (The Wizard of Oz), old age.
- Mike Thresher, 68, English football player.
- Pierre Wouters, 68, Belgian Olympic boxer (1952).

=== 29 ===
- Arturo Amos, 72, Argentine Olympic gymanst (1948).
- Giuseppe Ballerio, 90, Italian footballer.
- Ewan Douglas, 77, Scottish rugby player and Olympic athlete (1948, 1952).
- Robert Hoffstetter, 91, French taxonomist and herpetologist.
- Edward Hollamby, 78, English architect and town planner, heart disease.
- Ferenc Rabár, 70, Hungarian politician.
- Sir Leon Radzinowicz, 93, Polish-born British criminologist.
- José Cláudio dos Reis, 60, Brazilian sports administrator.
- Gerard Veringa, 75, Dutch politician.
- Jerzy Waldorff, 89, Polish baron, TV personality and writer.

=== 30 ===
- Tom Aherne, 80, Irish footballer and hurler.
- Clint Albright, 73, Canadian ice hockey player (New York Rangers).
- Arthur Bassett, 85, Welsh rugby player.
- Kjølv Egeland, 81, Norwegian politician.
- Anna Fehér, 78, Hungarian gymnast and Olympic silver medallist (1948).
- Sarah Knauss, 119, American supercentenarian and oldest person in the world.
- Fritz Leonhardt, 90, German structural engineer.
- Nicholas Marangello, 87, American mobster (Bonanno crime family).
- Louis Michel, 76, French mathematical physicist.

=== 31 ===
- Conrado Balweg, 57, Filipino Roman Catholic priest and communist revolutionary, shot.
- Dean Elliott, 82, American television and film composer, Alzheimer's disease.
- Ferdinand Finne, 89, Norwegian author, painter, theater decorator and costume designer.
- William Hughes, Baron Hughes, 88, British politician.
- Harry Kimberlin, 90, American baseball player (St. Louis Browns).
- Bob McKeen, 66, American college basketball player (California Golden Bears).
- Abul Hasan Ali Hasani Nadwi, 85, Indian Islamic scholar and author.
- Solomiia Pavlychko, 41, Ukrainian literary critic, philosopher, and feminist, carbon monoxide poisoning.
- Elliot Richardson, 79, American politician and diplomat, cerebral haemorrhage.
- Hamako Watanabe, 89, Japanese singer, cerebral infarction.
