= Habib Al-Naufali =

Iraqi Chaldean Catholic archbishop (born 1960)

The Most Reverend Habib Hormiz Jajou Al-Nawfali
- Archbishop of Basra and Southern Iraq
- Church: Chaldean Catholic Church
- Diocese: Basra and Southern Iraq
- Appointed: 11 January 2014
- Predecessor: Yousif Thomas Mirkis (as Apostolic Administrator)
- Other post: Apostolic Visitator for Chaldean faithful in Europe (2025–present)

Orders
- Ordination: 29 June 1998 by Raphael I Bidawid
- Consecration: 24 January 2014 by Louis Raphaël I Sako, Shlemon Warduni, Jean Benjamin Sleiman

Personal details
- Born: Habib Hormuz Al-Naufali; 8 February 1960 (age 66) Baqofa, Iraq
- Denomination: Chaldean Catholic Church
- Residence: Basra, Iraq
- Education: University of Mosul

Habib Hormiz Jajou Al-Nawfali (born 8 February 1960) is an Iraqi Chaldean Catholic hierarch, who has served as the Archbishop of the Archeparchy of Basra and Southern Iraq since 2014. In 2025, he was additionally appointed as the Apostolic Visitator for Chaldean faithful in Europe.

== Early life and priesthood ==
Habib Hormuz Al-Naufali was born on 8 February 1960 in Baqofa, Iraq. He completed his primary and secondary education in state schools and graduated from the University of Mosul. After that, he entered the Patriarchal Seminary and studied theology and philosophy at Babel College in Baghdad and was ordained to the priesthood on 29 June 1998 for the Archeparchy of Baghdad.

== Episcopate ==
On 11 January 2014, Pope Francis gave his assent to the election of Al-Naufali by the Synod of Bishops of the Chaldean Church as the Archbishop of Basra and Southern Iraq. He received his episcopal consecration on 24 January 2014 from Patriarch Louis Raphaël I Sako, with Shlemon Warduni and Jean Benjamin Sleiman serving as co-consecrators.

As Archbishop of Basra, Al-Naufali has been a vocal advocate for social reform and infrastructure development in southern Iraq. He has frequently described the "social catastrophe" facing the city of Basra due to pollution, lack of clean water, and political instability, calling for a new constitution to protect the rights of all citizens.

On 1 July 2025, the Holy See announced his appointment as the Apostolic Visitator for Chaldean Catholic faithful residing in Europe. In early 2026, following the resignation of Patriarch Louis Raphaël I Sako, Al-Naufali was a head of the electoral synod convened in Rome to elect a new Patriarch of the Chaldean Church.
