= Paulos Faraj Rahho =

Chaldean Catholic Archbishop of Mosul

- Archbishop of the Eparchy of Mosul
- See: Archeparchy of Mosul
- In office: 12 January 2001 – 13 March 2008
- Predecessor: George Garmo
- Successor: Emil Shimoun Nona

Orders
- Ordination: 10 June 1965

Personal details
- Born: November 20, 1942 Mosul, Iraq
- Died: March 2008 (aged 65) Mosul, Iraq

Paulos Faraj Rahho (also known as Paul Faraj Rahho and Paulos Faradsch Raho; Arabic: بولس فرج رحو, Būlus Farağ Raḥū; Syriac: ܦܘܠܘܣ ܦ̮ܪܔ ܪܚܘ, Paulōs Farağ Raḥō; 20 November 1942 – February or March 2008) was a Chaldean Catholic prelate who served as the Archeparch of Mosul in the northern part of Iraq from 2001 until his death in 2008 at the hands of terrorists.

== Biography ==
Paulos Faraj Rahho was born to a Chaldean Catholic family in 1942. He spent nearly all his life in Mosul, a city with one of the largest and oldest Christian populations in Iraq. In 1954, he entered the St. Peter's junior and major seminary in Baghdad in order to become a priest. After his ordination on June 10, 1965 he briefly worked in Baghdad before being appointed to St. Isiah's Church in Mosul. Between 1974 and 1976, Rahho completed his religious studies with a Licentiate in Theology from the Pontifical University of St. Thomas Aquinas, Angelicum in Rome.

Rahho later founded the church of the Sacred Heart in Tel Keppe, a town some 12 miles (20 km) north of Mosul. He also opened an orphanage for handicapped children.

=== Archbishop of Mosul ===
On January 12, 2001, the Synod of Bishops of the Chaldean Catholic Church elected him archbishop of the Archeparchy of Mosul. On February 16, 2001, he was ordained Chaldean Archbishop of Mosul, giving him responsibility for around 20,000 Catholics in ten parishes. He was ordained by Mar Raphael I Bidawid, the Patriarch of Babylon. His church is known in Mosul as Safina (The Ship), but parishioners called it the Holy Spirit Church.

=== Unease with Sharia ===
Rahho expressed disquiet at the moves to incorporate Sharia law more fundamentally into the Iraqi constitution, and continued throughout his life to lead worship in difficult situations. During his 2007 trip to Rome, with the patriarch of Babylon Emmanuel III Delly who was then appointed cardinal, Rahho confided that he had been threatened by gunmen in his native town. Following the start of the Iraq war, persecution of Christians in Iraq increased dramatically. Rahho commented on the precarious situation of Chaldean Christians in an interview with Asia News shortly before his kidnapping.

== Kidnapping and death ==
Late on February 29, 2008, according to a report given by the Catholic News Service, Rahho was kidnapped from his car in the Al-Nur district of the city; his bodyguards and driver were killed. According to church officials, "gunmen sprayed the Archbishop's car with bullets, killed two bodyguards and shoved the bishop into the trunk of a car. In the darkness, he managed to pull out his cellphone and call the church, telling officials not to pay a ransom for his release" they said. "He believed that this money would not be paid for good works and would be used for killing and more evil actions," the officials said. Other reports stated that also investigators assumed the archbishop may have been shot at the time of the kidnapping.

The kidnappers demanded Christians contribute to the jihad, through jizya. The captors also demanded the release of Arab (non-Iraqi) detainees and that they be paid $3 million for Rahho's release. The kidnappers also demanded that Iraqi Christians form a militia to fight the US forces.

On March 13, 2008, it was reported that Rahho's body had been found buried in a shallow grave near Mosul. Officials of the Chaldean Church in Iraq said they had received a call telling them where the body was buried. Reports over the cause of death were contradictory. An official of the morgue in Mosul said the archbishop, who had health problems, including high blood pressure and diabetes, might have died of natural causes. Police at the Mosul morgue said Rahho "appeared to have been dead a week and his body bore no bullet wounds". Nineveh Deputy Governor Khasro Goran stated that when relatives and authorities went to the location specified by the kidnappers and found the body, it had "gunshot wounds". The identity of those behind his murder is disputed. Some Chaldeans within the community assume Al-Qaida and other Sunni Arab factions were behind the murder. Other Christians in Mosul, including the archbishop's family, claim that it was the Kurds who ordered his assassination. Kurdish authorities ordered an investigation and subsequently made several arrests, though their reports have failed to convince the family.

Archbishop Paulos Faraj Rahho is believed to be the highest-ranking Chaldean Catholic clergyman to have been killed in the Iraq war. The funeral services were held in the town of Karamlesh, with Chaldean Catholic Cardinal Emmanuel Delly in presence.

=== International reactions ===
- Vatican City: Pope Benedict XVI stated the murder was "an act of inhuman violence that offends the dignity of the human being." "The pope also denounced the 5-year-long Iraq war, saying it had provoked the complete breakup of Iraqi civilian life. 'Enough with the slaughters. Enough with the violence. Enough with the hatred in Iraq!' Benedict said to applause at the end of his Palm Sunday Mass in St. Peter's Square."
- Iraq: Prime Minister Nouri al-Maliki said "the attack was the work of a criminal gang intent on provoking religious strife."
- United Kingdom: British Foreign Secretary David Miliband said "His [Archbishop Rahho's] kidnapping was a cowardly act perpetrated by individuals who have rejected dialogue and peaceful politics. His killing represents an appalling act of premeditated violence. My thoughts are with the Archbishop's family."
- United States: President Bush was quoted as saying "I send my condolences to the Chaldean community and the people of Iraq. The terrorists will continue to lose in Iraq because they are savage and cruel." The Arab American Institute said "This despicable act against a peaceful leader of a vulnerable (Chaldean) minority community violates every moral code."
- Chaldean Catholic Church: Patriarch Emmanuel III Delly, who broke down and wept during funeral services in Karamles, urged Christians on Friday not to seek revenge for the death of the archbishop.

=== Aftermath ===
One of the killers, named Ahmed Ali Ahmed, was found and arrested. Ahmed was an Al-Qaida in Iraq cell leader in Mosul. On 19 May 2008, the Iraqi Central Criminal Court sentenced Ahmed to death. However, high representatives of the Chaldean Catholic Church opposed the death sentence. In his will, Rahho called upon the Iraqi Assyrian Christian community to work with Muslim and Yazidi Iraqis to develop ties across religious divisions within Iraq.

== See also ==
- Catholic Church in Iraq

Catholic Church titles
Preceded by Mar George Garmo	Chaldean Catholic Archbishop of Mosul; 2001 – 2008	Succeeded by Emil Shimoun Nona
