= Thabet Habib Yousif Al Mekko =

Iraqi Chaldean Catholic hierarch (1976–2025)

His Excellency Paulus Thabet Habib Yousif Al Mekko
- Bishop of Alqosh
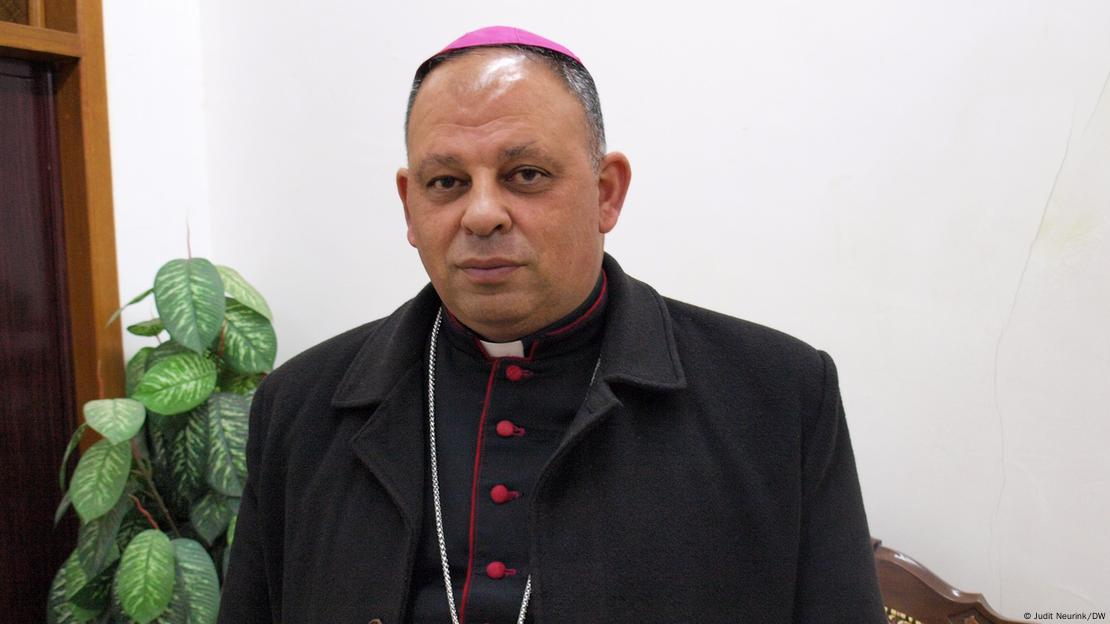
- Al Mekko in 2022
- Diocese: Alqosh
- Appointed: 14 August 2021
- Term ended: 18 June 2025
- Predecessor: Mikha Pola Maqdassi
- Successor: Vacant

Orders
- Ordination: 25 July 2008
- Consecration: 22 October 2021 by Louis Raphaël I Sako

Personal details
- Born: 14 February 1976 Karamlesh, Iraq
- Died: 18 June 2025 (aged 49) Alqosh, Iraq

Paulus Thabet Habib Yousif Al Mekko (Arabic: ثابت حبيب يوسف ال مكو; 14 February 1976 – 18 June 2025) was an Iraqi Chaldean Catholic hierarch and Bishop of Alqosh.

== Biography ==
Thabet Habib Yousif Al Mekko was born on 14 February 1976. He graduated from the University of Mosul. He completed his ecclesiastical studies as a seminarian in Rome, where he obtained his theological degree from the Pontifical Urbaniana University and later the licentiate from the Augustinianum Patristic Institute. After returning to Iraq, he received the sacrament of priestly ordination for the Archeparchy of Mosul in his hometown on 25 July 2008.

When the Islamic State invaded the Nineveh Plains in 2014, Al Mekko accompanied the Christian refugees to Erbil. In September 2017, he returned to Karemlasch and worked again as a pastor; he also taught patrology and theology at Babel College.

On 14 August 2021, Pope Francis confirmed the election of Al Mekko as coadjutor bishop of Alqosh by the Synod of the Chaldean Catholic Church; his ordination took place on 22 October 2021. On 8 October 2022, he succeeded Mikha Pola Maqdassi as bishop of Alqosh.

Al Mekko died in Alqosh on 18 June 2025, at the age of 49.

Pontifical charity Aid to the Church in Need wrote in an obituary that the bishop was "not only a close partner but a true companion in mission". The charity lauded his efforts in helping resettle and deal with the massive influx of Christians in Iraqi Kurdistan following the invasion of Mosul and the Nineveh Plain by ISIS, and noted that he was the first to return to Karamlesh after it was liberated. "Bishop Thabet helped document the devastation of the town and later led efforts to rebuild its churches, homes, and spiritual life. He encouraged many families to return, settle again, and begin cultivating their land once more."

Catholic Church titles
Preceded by Mikha Pola Maqdassi	Bishop of Alqosh; 2021–2025	Succeeded by Vacant
