= Maqdassi =

Maqdassi is an Assyrian surname. Notable people with the surname include:

- Mikha Pola Maqdassi (born 1949), Iraqi Chaldean Catholic bishop
- Shimun XV Maqdassi Mikhail (died 1780), Catholicos-Patriarch of the Church of the East
- Srood Maqdasy (born 1975), Iraqi Assyrian politician
