= Jibrail Kassab =

- Archbishop of Saint Thomas the Apostle of Sydney
- See: Eparchy of Saint Thomas the Apostle of Sydney
- Installed: 21 October 2006
- Term ended: 15 January 2015
- Successor: Amel Shimoun Nona
- Previous post: Archbishop of Basra

Orders
- Ordination: 19 January 1961
- Consecration: 5 May 1996 by Raphaël I Bidawid

Personal details
- Born: 4 August 1938 (age 88) Tel Keppe, Kingdom of Iraq

Ordination history of Jibrail Kassab
History
Episcopal consecration
- Principal consecrator: Mar Raphael I Bidawid
- Co-consecrators: Archbishop Georges Garmo

Jibrail Kassab (born 4 August 1938) is an Iraqi Chaldean Catholic hierarch who served as Chaldean Eparch of Saint Thomas the Apostle of Sydney from 2006 to 2015.

== Biography ==
Kassab was born in Tel Keppe, Iraq, to an Assyrian family. He was ordained a priest on 19 January 1961. Following 35 years of service in the priesthood, he was elevated to the episcopate by the then Patriarch of Babylon of the Chaldeans, Mar Raphael I Bidawid. Upon his installation, his first post was Archeparc of Basra.

Following the difficult plight of Iraq's Chaldean Christians during the Iraq War, Pope Benedict XVI transferred Kassab to a safer area and created the Chaldean Catholic Eparchy of Saint Thomas the Apostle of Sydney to cover all of Australia and New Zealand; he installed Kassab as its eparch in 2006.

Preceded by None	Chaldean Bishop of Sydney; 2006–2015	Succeeded by Amel Nona
