= Chaldean Catholic Eparchy of Beirut =

Coordinates: 33.8833°N 35.5000°E

Eparchy of Beirut Eparchia Berytensis Chaldaeorum

Location
- Country: Lebanon
- Headquarters: Beirut, Lebanon
- Population: (as of 2023); 17,000

Information
- Denomination: Chaldean Catholic Church
- Sui iuris church: Chaldean Catholic Church
- Rite: East Syriac Rite
- Established: 3 July 1957; 69 years ago
- Secular priests: 3 Diocesan

Current leadership
- Pope: Leo XIV
- Patriarch: Paul III Nona
- Eparch: Michel Kassarji

The Chaldean Catholic Eparchy of Beirut is the sole eparchy (Eastern Catholic diocese) of the Chaldean Catholic Church (sui iuris, Syro-Oriental Rite in Syriac/Aramaic language) for all Lebanon.

It is immediately dependent on the Chaldean Catholic Patriarch of Babylon (in Baghdad, Iraq), not part of any ecclesiastical province.

Its cathedral episcopal see is in Beirut, the capital of Lebanon.

== History ==
Established on 3 July 1957, on territory split off from the suppressed Eparchy of Gazireh of the Chaldeans.

== Episcopal ordinaries ==
(all Chaldean Rite)

Suffragan Eparchs (Bishops) of Beirut

- Gabriel Naamo (28 June 1957 – 12 February 1964)
- Gabriel Ganni (12 February 1964 – 2 March 1966), appointed Coadjutor Archeparch of Basra
- Raphael Bidawid (2 March 1966 – 11 June 1989), confirmed Patriarch of Babylon
- Yousif Thomas (24 October 1995 – 22 December 1999)
  - Patriarchal Administrator Michel Kassarji (January 2000 – 12 January 2001), priest of Beirut
- Michel Kassarji (12 January 2001 – Present)

Coadjutor Eparch (Bishop) of Beirut

- Gabriel Ganni (1959-1964), Auxiliary Eparch of Beirut

Auxiliary Eparch (Bishop) of Beirut

- Gabriel Ganni (1956-1959), Titular Eparch of Gargara

== See also ==
- Catholic Church in Lebanon
- Chaldean Catholic Church
