= Tel Keppe =

Tel Keppe ܬܸܠ ܟܹܐܦܹܐ
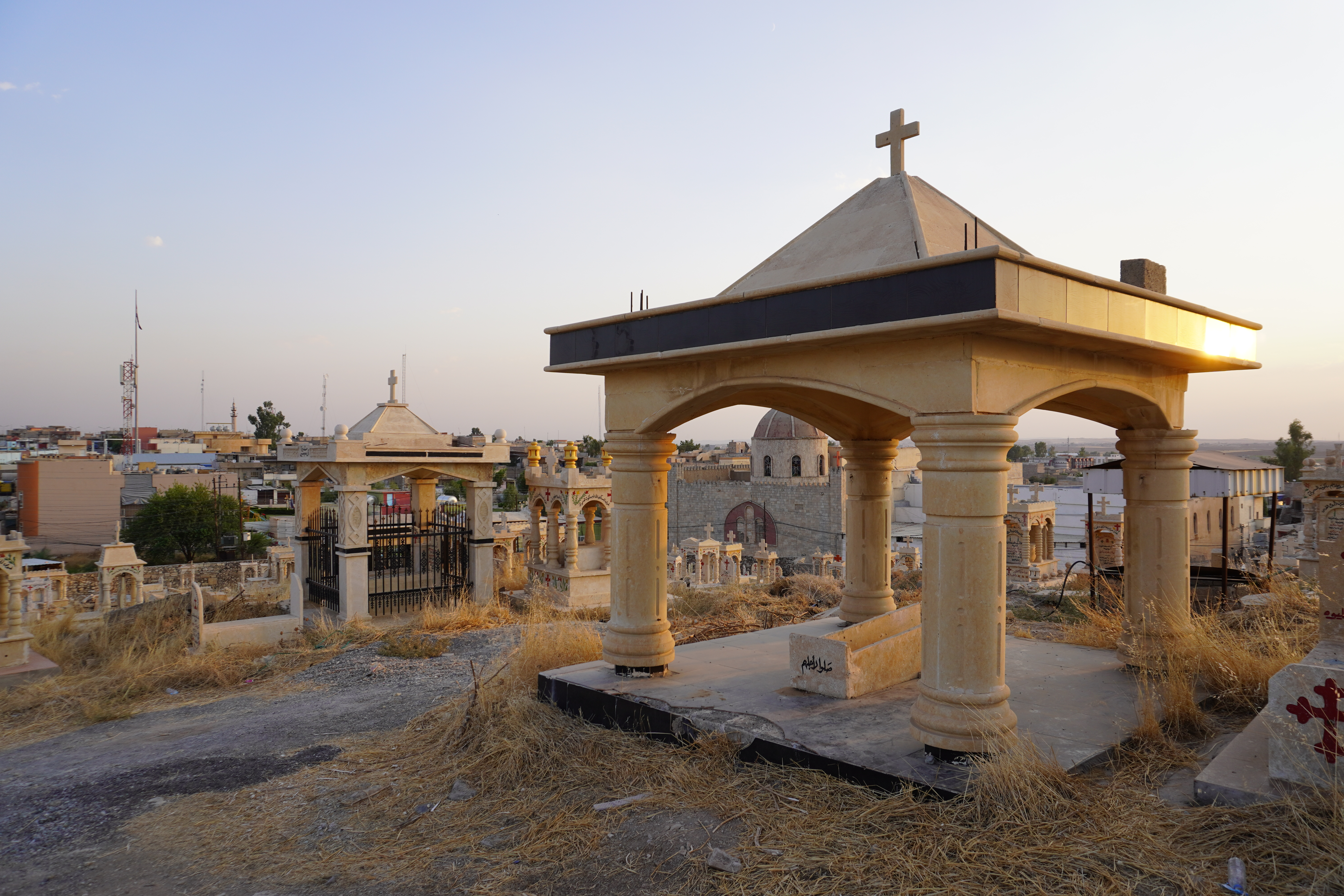
- A photo of the Tel Keppe cemetery

- Location within Iraq
- Coordinates: 36°29′22″N 43°7′9″E
- Country: Iraq
- Governorate: Nineveh
- District: Tel Kaif District

Government
  - Mayor: Raad Naser

Population (2010)
  - Total: 40,000
- Prior to ISIS, August 2014
- Demonym: Assyrian:Tel-Kepnaya (m)/Tel-Kepnetha (f) Arabic:Tel-Kayfi (m)/Tel-Kayfiya (f)

Tel Keppe (Syriac: ܬܸܠ ܟܹܐܦܹܐ, Arabic: تل كيف, romanized: Tall Kayf, alternatively spelled Tel Kaif, Tilkepe, or Telkef) is a Chaldean Catholic Assyrian populated town in northern Iraq. It is located in the Tel Keppe District of the Nineveh Governorate, less than 8 mi (13 km) northeast of Mosul.

The people who descend from the village of Tel Keppe are ethnic Assyrians, who are indigenous to the village and the Nineveh Plains. The majority of Assyrians from the village adhere to the Chaldean Catholic Church, and due to its influences, many Telkepnayeh hold a strong Chaldean identity.

== Etymology ==
The name Tel Keppe (Syriac: ܬܸܠ ܟܹܐܦܹܐ) is of Assyrian Aramaic origin and derives from the words til meaning "hill of", and kēpē meaning "stones". Therefore, the town's name translates to "hill of stones".

== History ==
The first reliable reference to the town is written in the book The History of Mosul, by Abu Zakaria Azidi. The book was released in 945 AD and he wrote about the history of Mosul, in which he referenced the town of Tel Keppe. Zakaria also mentioned a different author from the year 749 AD, who also mentions the village Tel Keppe as one of the Mosul's many suburbs.

In 1508, Tel Keppe was sacked by Mongols. In 1743, Tel Keppe was looted and burned by the armies of the Persian leader Nader Shah. This event took place within the context of the siege of Mosul, in which the Persian army suffered heavy casualties and resorted to looting the surrounding towns to have some semblance of victory. In 1833, the town was once again sacked, this time by Mohammed Pasha the Kurdish governor of Rawandiz who also sacked the town of Alqosh.

According to Mary Sengstock, Tel Keppe became Chaldean Catholic around 1830 following a series of street brawls. The brawls took place between those who wanted to become Roman Catholic and those who desired to remain part of the Church of the East. The conflicts ended as the entire village became Catholic.

=== Occupation by ISIS ===
On 6 August 2014, the town was captured by the Islamic State (ISIS), along with the nearby Assyrian towns of Bakhdida, Bartella and Karamlesh which were also overrun by ISIS militants during their August 2014 northern Iraq offensive. Upon entering the town, ISIS looted the homes and removed the crosses and other religious objects from the churches. The cemetery in the town was also later destroyed.

Soon after the beginning of the Battle of Mosul, Iraqi troops advanced on Tel Keppe, but the fighting continued into 2017. Iraqi forces recaptured the town from ISIS on 19 January 2017.

In 2017, Salman Esso Habba of the "Christian Mobilization" militia–a part of the Popular Mobilization Forces–warned the Sunni Arabs to leave or else they would be disposed of, claiming that Tel Keppe's homes belonged only to Assyrians in the town, MEMO reported on Wednesday. He also said that Christians' homes and rights could not be taken away. This incident was reported by MEMO as a threat of ethnic cleansing against Sunni Arabs; Sabah Al-Mukhtar, head of the UK-based Arab Lawyers Network and a legal expert, regarded this as a threat of genocide from a legal perspective.

=== Recent history ===
Five years after the liberation of Tel Keppe and most of the indigenous Assyrian population is yet to return, mostly due to the presence of the non-local Babylon Brigades militia. The majority of the towns inhabitants either fled to large cities, or fled Iraq as a whole. Very few Assyrians returned or had any plans to return.

== Arabization ==
Tel Keppe has faced Arabization since the late 1970s under the rule of Saddam Hussein. Arabs began moving to Tel Keppe, while Assyrians began moving to the larger cities in Iraq, mainly Baghdad, Basra and Mosul. The Northern Iraq Offensive by ISIS made things even worse for the Assyrians. After Tel Keppe was invaded, most Assyrians fled to Baghdad and the Kurdistan Region or fled Iraq entirely, causing more Arabs to settle in the town. The contested security between the Kurdish Peshmerga and the Shia paramilitary force PMU and presence of Arab-dominated militias in the Nineveh Plains has prevented the return of thousands of Tel Keppe residents. Tel Keppe has a majority Arab Muslim population as of 2021.

== Climate ==
Tel Keppe has a semi-arid climate (BSh) with extremely hot summers and cool, damp winters, typical to the Nineveh Plains.

Climate data for Tel Keppe
| Month | Jan | Feb | Mar | Apr | May | Jun | Jul | Aug | Sep | Oct | Nov | Dec | Year |
|---|---|---|---|---|---|---|---|---|---|---|---|---|---|
| Mean daily maximum °C (°F) | 12 (54) | 14 (57) | 20 (68) | 26 (79) | 34 (93) | 38 (100) | 43 (109) | 40 (104) | 38 (100) | 30 (86) | 20 (68) | 14 (57) | 27 (81) |
| Mean daily minimum °C (°F) | 2 (36) | 4 (39) | 8 (46) | 11 (52) | 16 (61) | 21 (70) | 25 (77) | 24 (75) | 20 (68) | 14 (57) | 6 (43) | 4 (39) | 13 (55) |
| Average precipitation mm (inches) | 39 (1.5) | 69 (2.7) | 51 (2.0) | 9 (0.4) | 0 (0) | 0 (0) | 0 (0) | 0 (0) | 0 (0) | 6 (0.2) | 36 (1.4) | 60 (2.4) | 270 (10.6) |
| Average precipitation days | 10 | 10 | 11 | 9 | 0 | 0 | 0 | 0 | 0 | 5 | 8 | 12 | 65 |
Source: World Weather Online (2000–2012)

== Demographics ==
In 1768, the town had a recorded population of 2,500. Due to plague and other disasters, the population was around 1,500 in 1882, rising to 2,500 again by 1891. In 1923, the population was recorded as 14,000. In 1933, the population numbered around 10,000. As a result of emigration from the town to Baghdad and the United States, the population shrunk to 7,108 by 1968.

The district of Tel Keppe was approximately 50% Christian in the mid 1900s, the town of Tel Keppe remaining almost exclusively Assyrian with a population of 6,600 inhabitants. Throughout the late 20th century, the town experienced non-native population growth from the arrival of Arabs, who established residence throughout the town and became the majority after ISIS. By the turn of the century, the population had swelled to close to 30,000.

Some families who settled in Tel Keppe are:

- Asmar and Abso from Diyarbakır
- Karmo and Mengeshnayeh from Saart
- Dinha/Joja, Shalal, and Abro from Ashitha (Tyari)
- Ma’arouf and Qoryaqos from Tal Afar
- Zooma, Khoshe, and Hnawa from Mardin
- Jolagh from Alqosh
- Nasfo from Aleppo
- Saba and Kharkhar from Iran
- Twaini from Amadiya
- Orou from Sanna, Iran
- Jammo, Kassab, and Manni from Bashbetha
- Jibaya and Kthawe from Turkey
- Talya from Lebanon
- Qasha Giwargis from Quchanis, Turkey
- Qarbo from Jazirat Ibn Omar
- Bizzi from al-Karaj
- Qashat from Sinjar

== Diaspora ==
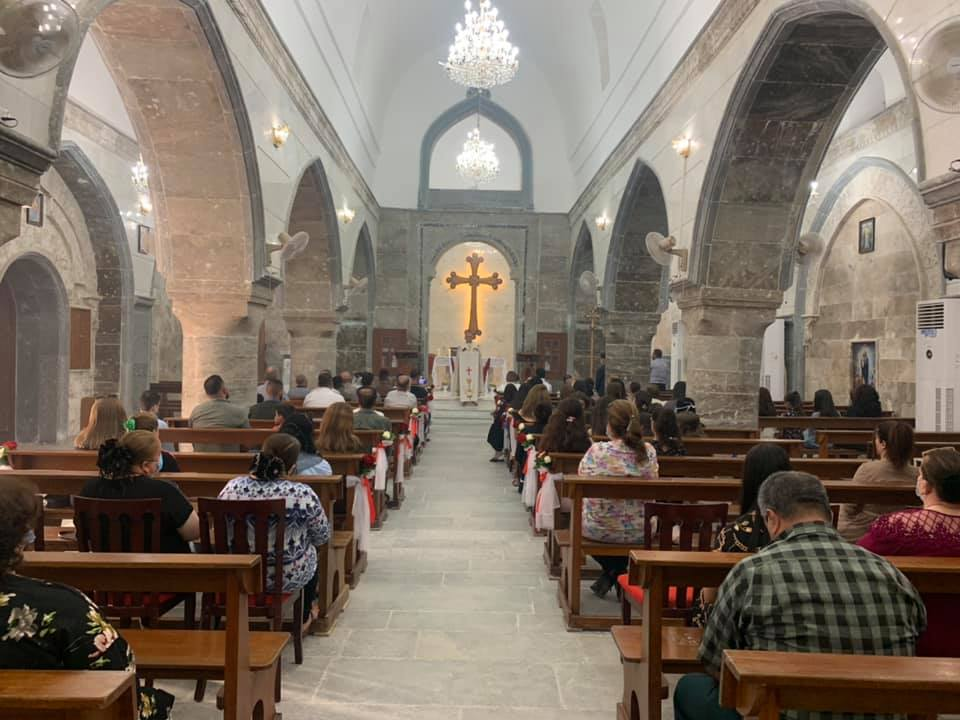
Chaldean Catholics in Tel Keppe

Starting in the 1980s, and especially after the 1991 Gulf War and 2003 US invasion of Iraq, many Chaldean Catholics from Tel Keppe fled to other countries, primarily the United States. They set up their lives there with new churches and business for their families. By 2001, many Tel-Kepnayeh had moved to major cities in Iraq such as Baghdad or Mosul.

Many Assyrians in the Metro Detroit area trace their origins to Tel Keppe. According to the estimates of a priest of Tel Keppe's Sacred Heart Chaldean Rite Catholic Church, there were 10,000 worshippers in the late 1950s, which later decreased to 2,000 around 2004. He said: "Many people don’t want to go from here; they cry that they have to go… but you almost have to leave these days because your family probably already is in Detroit."

== Culture ==
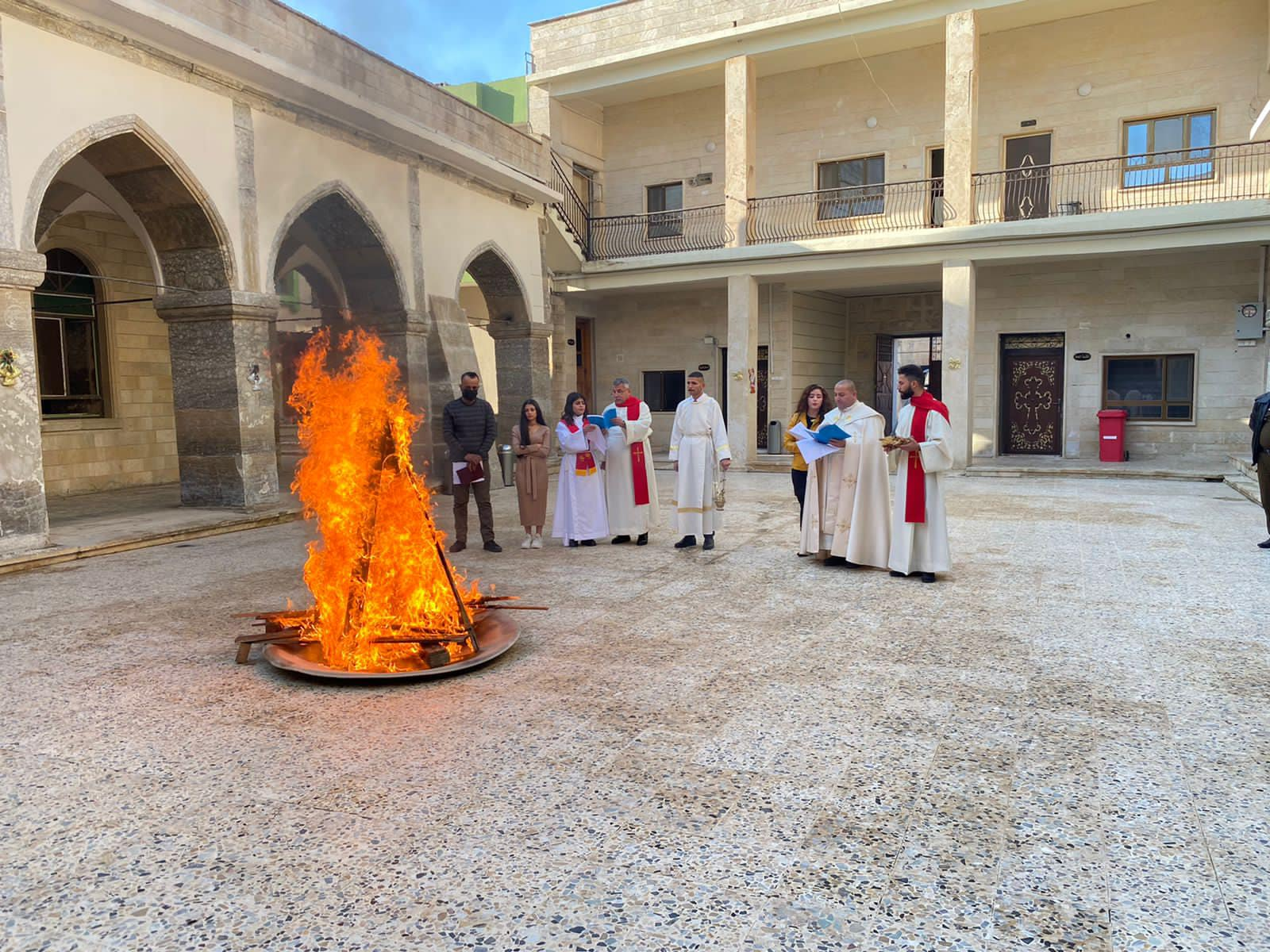
Religious ceremony in Tel Keppe

Tel Keppe was historically the center of the Chaldean Catholic community in Iraq. Each family residing in Tel Keppe had one or more plots of farming land located outside Tel Keppe. The land produced barley and wheat, and animals raised there included goats and sheep. Natalie Jill Smith, author of "Ethnicity, Reciprocity, Reputation and Punishment: An Ethnoexperimental Study of Cooperation among the Chaldeans and Hmong of Detroit (Michigan)", wrote that in the reports of the village "everyone was related" and that marriage tended to occur between two people from the same village.

== Notable people ==
- Maria Theresa Asmar, author and explorer, born in 1806. Published her memoir "Babylonian Princess" in English in 1844
- Tariq Aziz (1936–2015) Foreign Minister and Deputy Prime Minister and a close advisor of President Saddam Hussein.
- Emmanuel III Delly: Patriarch of the Chaldean Catholic Church (1927–2014)
- George Garmo, Archbishop of the Chaldean Catholic Archeparchy of Mosul from 14 September 1980 until his death on 9 September 1999 and the Pastor of the Mother of God Parish in Southfield, MI.
- Ramzi Garmou: Archbishop of Tehran – Iran for the Chaldean Catholic Church
- Ibrahim Namo Ibrahim: Bishop Emeritus of the Chaldean Catholic Church for the Eastern United States
- Yusuf Malek, Assyrian politician and author of "The British Betrayal of the Assyrians"
- Joseph II Marouf: Patriarch of the Chaldean Catholic Church (1667–1713)

== See also ==
- Assyrian homeland
- Assyrians in Iraq
- Nineveh Plains
- List of Assyrian settlements
- Iraqi conflict (2003–present)

== Bibliography ==
- Sengstock, Mary (1982). Chaldean Americans: Changing Conceptions of Ethnic Identity (PDF) (1st ed.). Wayne State University: Center for Migration Studies.
