= Eugene Manna =

Chaldean Catholic bishop of Basra (1867–1928)

Mār Jacob Eugene Manna
- Native name: ܝܥܩܘܒ ܐܘܓܝܢ ܡܢܐ
- Church: Chaldean Catholic Church
- Archdiocese: Bassorah
- See: Rome

Personal details
- Born: Joseph (Yawsep); 1867 Bakofa
- Died: 15 February 1928 (aged 60–61)

Mar Jacob Awgen Manna (Syriac: ܝܰܥܩܘܒ ܐܰܘܓܝܢ ܡܰܢܐ, romanized: Yaʿqob Awgīn Manna; 1867–1928), also called Jacques-Eugène Manna, was bishop and scholar of the Chaldean Catholic Church. He is known for publishing many Syriac books on grammar and lexicography. He died in 1928; his body was found floating in the Tigris river.

== Life ==
Yaʿqob was born in 1867 in Baqofah in Ninveh (modern-day northern Iraq), with the given baptismal name of Joseph (Syriac: ܝܘܣܦ, romanized: Yawsep). An alumnus of the Patriarchal Seminary in Mosul, he was ordained a priest on August 15, 1889, by Patriarch Eliya XIV. He worked with the Dominican Press and headed the Seminary of St. John in Mosul from 1895 to 1902, where he taught Syriac Aramaic.

In 1902 he traveled to Rome with Patriarch Joseph Emmanuel Thomas alongside the famous scholar Addai Scher, where both priests were ordained bishops there. He remained in Europe until the end of World War I as bishop of the titular see of Tabbora, then went to Basra to head that diocese from 1921 to 1928 as the Patriarchal Vicar.

In February 1928, he attempted to return to Rome, but the patriarch forbade him. On Holy Thursday of that year, he mysteriously disappeared. His body was later found in the Tigris river.

== Works ==
Mar Yaʿqob demonstrated an excellent knowledge of the Syriac language. He composed multiple works:

- Grammar of the Aramaic Language, Mosul 1896
- Syriac-Arabic Dictionary, Mosul 1900 (re-edited by R. J. Bidawid, Beirut 1975)
- Morceaux choisis de littérature araméenne (Marge pegyānāye d-mardutā d-Ārāmāye), 2 volumes, Mosul 1901

The last book has been particularly influential and remains in use as one of the standard Syriac dictionaries.

== See also ==
- Toma Audo
- Chaldean Catholic Eparchy of Seert
- Mar Awgin
- Anti-Assyrian sentiment
- Sayfo
