= Baqofah =

- Village
- Location in Iraq Baqofah (Iraqi Kurdistan)
- Coordinates: 36.58888°N 43.13055°E
- Country: Iraq
- Federal region: Kurdistan Region (de facto)
- Governorate: Nineveh Governorate
- District: Tel Kaif District
- Sub-district: Tel Keppe

Baqofah (Arabic: باقوفا; Syriac: ܒܝܬ ܩܘܦܐ) (Note: Alternatively transliterated as Baqofa or Baqufa.) is a village in Nineveh Governorate, Iraq. It is located in the Tel Kaif District in the Nineveh Plains.

In the village, there is a Chaldean Catholic church of Mar Gewargis.

== Etymology ==
Several theories have been put forward for the origin of the name of the village as the French Syriacist Jean Maurice Fiey argues it is derived from "beth" ("place" in Syriac) and "qōpé" ("wooded" in Syriac), and thus translates to "wooded place". Alternatively, it is suggested the name is either a combination of "beth" and "quba" ("baskets" in Syriac) and translate to "place of baskets" or "beth" and "qupa" ("monkey" in Syriac), and thus translate to "place of [the] monkey".

== History ==
Baqofah is located atop two tells, of which the largest is partially covered by the village graveyard. Whilst the French archaeologist Victor Place's survey found only the remains of jars in the early 19th century, others found several tombs containing an iron cuirass, sword, and dagger inlaid with gold. In addition, a sculpted panel depicting a man killing a lion and a cylinder with a cuneiform inscription was also discovered. Baqofah itself is first mentioned with the name Beṯ Qōpā in the Life of Rabban Hormizd in the seventh century AD as one of the villages that donated funds towards the construction of the Rabban Hormizd Monastery.

The village had a mixed Christian and Muslim population until the eighteenth century, when the Muslim villagers left to found a village of the same name nearby. At that time, Baqofah was part of the waqf of the Mosque of the Prophet Jonah at Mosul. Baqofah was plundered by the forces of Shahanshah Nader Shah in 1743 amidst the Ottoman–Persian War of 1743–1746. The Christian population of Baqofah was converted from the Church of the East to the Chaldean Catholic Church in the 18th century, and a Chaldean Catholic priest named Francis from Baqofah is known to have been active at Baghdad in 1808. A Kurdish attack on the village in 1833 resulted in the deaths of hundreds of villagers and abduction of many women and children.

In 1850, Baqofah was visited by the English missionary George Percy Badger, who recorded the village's population as 20 Chaldean Catholic families and noted they were served by one priest and one church as part of the diocese of Mosul. The population remained stable as 60% of the village's children died from croup at this time. From 1864 to 1870, Jerome Simon Sindjari of Tel Keppe, Chaldean Catholic Archbishop of Tehran, resided at Baqofah and served as its priest; he also restored one of the doors of the church of Mar Gewargis in 1868. The Chaldean Catholic priest Joseph Tfinkdji recorded that the village was inhabited by 1500 Chaldean Catholics with three priests and one church in 1913, although 490 inhabitants were counted in 1923. The population of Baqofah is recorded as 2211 people in the Iraqi census of 1957, however, the French Syriacist Jean Maurice Fiey argues the actual figure to be closer to 400 people at that time, and 70-80 families are noted to inhabit the village in 1961. The Iraqi census of 1987 recorded 500 Assyrians at Baqofah.

In early August 2014, Baqofah was abandoned as its population fled the Islamic State of Iraq and the Levant (ISIL) offensive in Northern Iraq, prior to which the village was inhabited by approximately 600 Assyrians with 91 families. After eleven days under ISIL occupation, Baqofah was seized by the Peshmerga, who subsequently occupied the village for three months, during which time the village was looted by Peshmerga soldiers; after which control of Baqofah was transferred to the Assyrian militia Dwekh Nawsha. Eventually, the village's population was permitted to return after the expulsion of ISIL from the Nineveh Plains and 30 families had resettled at Baqofah by June 2017. The population of Baqofah briefly found refuge elsewhere in October 2017 due to skirmishes between the Peshmerga and Iraqi government forces. By 2020, the village's population had grown to 202 Assyrians in 45 families.

== Notable people ==
- Eugene Manna (1867–1928), Chaldean Catholic bishop

== Bibliography ==
- Fiey, Jean Maurice (1975). Assyrie Chrétienne (in French). Vol. 2. Imprimerie Catholique de Beyrouth.
- Wilmshurst, David (2000). The Ecclesiastical Organisation of the Church of the East, 1318–1913 (PDF). Peeters Publishers.
