= Chaldean Catholic Eparchy of Alqosh =

Eastern Catholic eparchy in Iraq

Coordinates: 36.7333°N 43.1000°E

Eparchy of Alqosh Alquoshensis Chaldæorum

Location
- Country: Iraq
- Population: 32,070 (in 2009)

Information
- Denomination: Chaldean Catholic
- Rite: East Syriac Rite
- Established: October 24, 1960
- Secular priests: 11 (in 2009)

Current leadership
- Pope: Leo XIV
- Patriarch: Louis Raphaël I Sako
- Bishop: Sede vacante

The Eparchy of Alqosh is a Chaldean Catholic Church diocese established in 1960. It is in the frontier town of Alqosh. The bishop is dependent to the Patriarch of Baghdad, not part of any ecclesiastical province.

== Eparchial bishops ==
Bishops and archbishops of the Eparchy and their terms of service:

- Abdul-Ahad Sana (1961–2001)
- Mikha Pola Maqdassi (2001–2022)
- Thabet Habib Yousif Al Mekko (2022–2025)
