= Chaldean Catholic Archeparchy of Mosul =

Eastern Catholic archeparchy in Iraq

Archeparchy of Mosul Archieparchia Mausiliensis Chaldaeorum

Location
- Country: Iraq

Statistics
- Area: 528 km^{2} (204 sq mi)
- Population: 16,815
- Parishes: 13

Information
- Denomination: Chaldean Catholic
- Rite: Chaldean Rite
- Established: 14 February 1967
- Cathedral: St Paul's Cathedral
- Secular priests: 8

Current leadership
- Pope: Leo XIV
- Archbishop: Najib Mikhael Moussa

The Chaldean Catholic Archeparchy of Mosul (Latin: Archieparchia Mausiliensis Chaldaeorum) is a diocese of the Chaldean Catholic Church, located in the northern Iraqi city of Mosul. Its followers are ethnic Assyrians and speakers of Neo-Aramaic. The diocese comprises the city of Mosul. The territory is subdivided in 12 parishes.

The diocese of Mosul was elevated to Archeparchy of Mosul on February 14, 1967 by Pope Paul VI. The ordinary was Mar Paulos Faraj Rahho until his death in early 2008. He was succeeded in November 2009 by Archbishop-elect Emil Shimoun Nona, who until his election and ratification had been a professor of anthropology at Babel College and a pastor and vicar general in the eparchy of Alqosh. As of 2012 the Papal Nuncio was Archbishop Francis Assisi Chullikatt, whose Apostolic Nunciature is the entire state of Iraq.

Mosul was the see of the Patriarch of the Chaldean Catholic Church from Mar Yohannan Hormizd (1760–1838) to Mar Yousef VI Emmanuel II Thomas (1852-1947).

== Archbishop ==
The archeparchy is led by the prelature of an archbishop, concurrently the pastor of St. Paul's Cathedral. The cathedral was the target of a bombing on December 7, 2004, leaving the building badly damaged. The bishop's residence was a modern two-story building that housed the archbishopric, which was 10 km away from the cathedral. The bishopric was built and inaugurated in 1995 by the late Mar George Garmo. It was destroyed on August 12, 1995 by five attackers who ransacked the building after forcing everyone to leave and loading the building with dynamite.
Late on February 29, 2008, according to a report given by the Catholic News Service, Archbishop Rahho was kidnapped from his car; his bodyguards and driver were killed. On 13 March 2008, it was reported that the Archbishop's body had been found buried near Mosul.

== Ordinaries ==
1. Yohannan Hormizd (1778-1818)
2. Nicholas I Zaya
3. Joseph Audo (1825-1833)
4. Eliya Abulyonan
5. Audishu V Khayyath
6. Yousef VI Emmanuel II Thomas (1900-1947)
7. Yousef VII Ghanima (1947-1958)
8. Paul II Cheikho (1958-1960)
9. Emmanuel Daddi † (June 27, 1960 - January 11, 1980 deceased)
10. Georges F. Garmo † (April 23, 1980 - September 9, 1999 deceased)
11. Paulos Faraj Rahho † (January 12, 2001 - 2008 Killed - body found March 13, 2008)
12. Emil Shimoun Nona (November 13, 2009 - ?) (transferred to Australia and New Zealand after exile)
13. Najib Mikhael Moussa (December 22, 2018 - )

== List of churches ==
The following is a list of churches under the Archeparchy of Mosul and their locations:

- St. Miskenta the Martyr - Al Mayasa
- St. Isiah - Ras Al Koor
- St. Paul - Hai Al-Majmou'a
- Our Mother of Perpetual Help - Dawasa
- St. Joseph - Al-Mayda
- Church of the Virgin Mary - Al-Dargazliya
- St. Ephrem - Mousal Al-Jadida
- Sacred Heart - Tel Keppe
- St. Addai - Karamles

== Statistics ==
The following statistics were reported in the year 2004.

- Total Catholics: 20,600
- Diocesan Priests: 10
- Religious Priests: 4
- Total Priests: 14
- Catholics per Priest: 1,471
- Permanent Deacons: 1
- Male Religious: 4
- Parishes: 10

Chaldean communities in the archdiocese of Mosul, 1913

Name of Village	Name in Syriac	Number of Believers	Number of Priests	Number of Churches	Name of Village	Name in Syriac	Number of Believers	Number of Priests	Number of Churches
Mosul	ܡܘܨܠ	4,500	15	8	Telesqof	ܬܠܐ ܙܩܝܦܐ	3,500	5	1
Alkosh	ܐܠܩܘܫ	7,000	6	3	Karamless	ܟܪܡܠܫ	4,000	3	2
Telkef	ܬܠ ܟܐܦܐ	8,000	7	3	Bendawaïa		100	1	0
Batnaye	ܒܛܢܝܐ	2,500	3	1	Pioz		100	1	1
Baqofa	ܒܝܬ ܩܘܦܐ	1,500	3	1	Nesaria		700	1	1
