= Yusuf Malek =

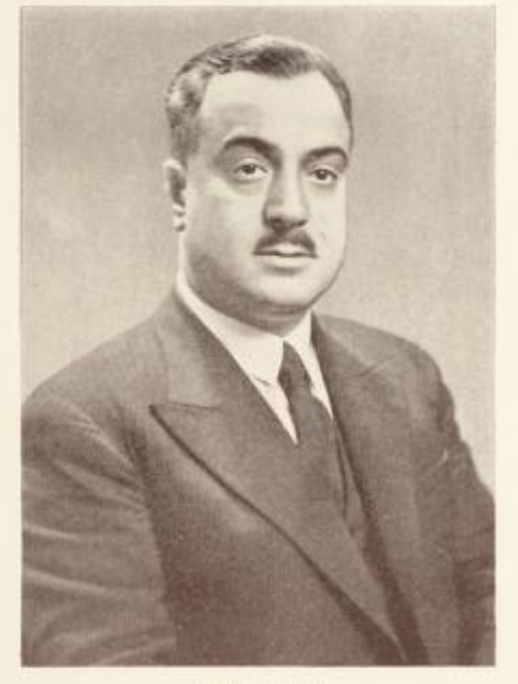
- Born: March 28, 1899; Baghdad, Ottoman Empire
- Died: 1959 (aged 60)
- Notable work: The British Betrayal of the Assyrians

Yusuf Malek (Assyrian Neo-Aramaic: ܝܘܣܦ ܡܠܟ; March 28, 1899 – 1959) was an Assyrian politician, author, and Allied interpreter. He initially served with the British Army as an interpreter during the Mesopotamian campaign of the First World War. Captured by the Ottomans after the disastrous Siege of Kut, he was eventually released and found his way back into the employ of the British. After the war, he became a politician in the Kingdom of Iraq and worked to support the cause of the Assyrians both domestically and globally.

During the early 1930s, when Iraq was granted independence by the British, Malek worked to petition the British government for a firmer response to Iraqi atrocities such as the Simele massacre of 1933. After he was forcefully expelled from his office after independence, he went into exile in Cyprus. He later published a book, The British Betrayal of the Assyrians, in which he criticized the British government for their betrayal of the Assyrians and abandoning them to the massacres of the Iraqis. Malek died in 1959, his vision of an independent Assyria unfulfilled.

== Early life and career ==
=== Malek as a youth ===
Yusuf Malek was born in Baghdad on March 28, 1899, to Assyrians from Tel Keif in the district of Nineveh, the ancient Assyrian capital. He eventually gained the nickname of "Tel Kef's son" among his fellow Assyrians. There, he attended the Latin college. He had also attended the American college in Basra before World War I broke out. During the British occupation of Basra in 1914, he was working as an interpreter for them. This military service ended on November 25, 1915, when British troops, Malek among them, attempted to capture Ctesiphon, a city 26 miles southeast of Baghdad. This was the first attempt to capture Baghdad from the Ottoman Empire and it had failed. After the Ottomans had routed the British, they besieged them for five months at Kut el-Amara, ending in a British surrender along with 10,000 casualties. The survivors, including Malek, were sent on a death march to Turkey to work in railroad chain gangs. Remarkably, he was able to escape Turkey two months later and was re-employed by the British in 1917.

=== Political beginnings ===
After the war ended, Malek was appointed as an assistant to the governor of Samara. However, due to his belief that a future Assyria depended on the sale of oil to Western nations from Bet-Nahrein (which coincided with French and British political developments in that region), he was able to get a promotion to Secretary Inspector for the State of Nineveh. Because this sale would also benefit the newly established Turkey, a perpetrator of the Assyrian genocide during the First World War, Malek worked with other Assyrian leaders to establish an autonomous and sovereign Assyrian nation. Equally pressing was the formation of the new country, Iraq, in 1921 that could mean the end of any hope to establish an Assyrian country. Placed as the ruler of Iraq by the British was Faisal Al Husain, whom Malek would come to hate in later years.

== Discontent with the government ==
=== Betrayal ===
Nineveh was given to Iraq in the 1924 Conference of Constantinople. Hakkari though, also had a great many Assyrians living there. Being in Turkish territory, the Turks have decided to drive them out of Hakkari and into Northern Iraq. Trying to resolve the issue, the League of Nations mandated that the Mosul Vilayet was to be ceded to the British and that Hakkari was to stay as part of Turkey. The Assyrian homeland was thus split in two. On August 16, 1930, Malek was promoted to mayor of Sheehan in Northern Iraq. Two days later, the Minister of the Interior ordered him to be transferred to Nassiriya, at least 400 miles southeast of Malek's current station. Because there was really no reason as to why he must do this, Malek refused, thus angering the officials in the Iraqi government. he was not able to hold his position for long. Three months later in November, the U.K. decided to hand over control of Iraq to the Arab majority, not the Christian-Assyrian minority. This resulted in many high ranking Assyrian officials to be removed from office, Malek included.

=== Fighting back ===
Much embittered by how much the British had abandoned the Assyrians, Malek left Sheehan and went to Beirut, a city under French rule, where he wrote publications attacking the British and Iraqi governments. Only a few days after the Simele massacre occurred, where Assyrians in Northern Iraq were killed under the orders of Faisal, Malek went into exile in Cyprus in 1933. There, he met with the patriarch of the Assyrian Church of the East, Mar Ishai Shimun, and went to Europe to speak for the "Assyrian Cause". Although he was turned down for an audience in Switzerland, London, and France; Malek lectured many politicians on what was happening in the Middle East. The "Assyrian Cause", though, would only become international with the release of his book.

== The British Betrayal of the Assyrians ==
Published in 1935, The British Betrayal of the Assyrians allowed for the "Assyrian Cause" to reach the eyes and ears of a global audience. Blaming the British government for supporting an incompetent ruler such as Faisal, he further expressed his anger at the British for their lackluster response to the Simele massacre of 1933. Although he stated that he "personally [knew] many English gentlemen who had done all in their power to make the Assyrian position tolerable and are now ashamed to find the Assyrians persecuted", the British government had erred in their support of the "cruel" Arabs and abandonment of their Assyrian allies. He also criticized the British suppression of the Kurdish revolt against the Iraqis, stating that the British should have supported the vision of an independent Kurdistan instead of supporting Faisal no matter the cost for the sole purpose of protecting their oil interests in Iraq. Malek expressed outrage that the British had neglected to fulfill their promise of an independent nation, leaving the Assyrians to be helplessly murdered by the Arabs.

== See also ==
- Assyrian Levies
- Our Smallest Ally
