= The British Betrayal of the Assyrians =

1935 book by Yusuf Malek

The British Betrayal of The Assyrians
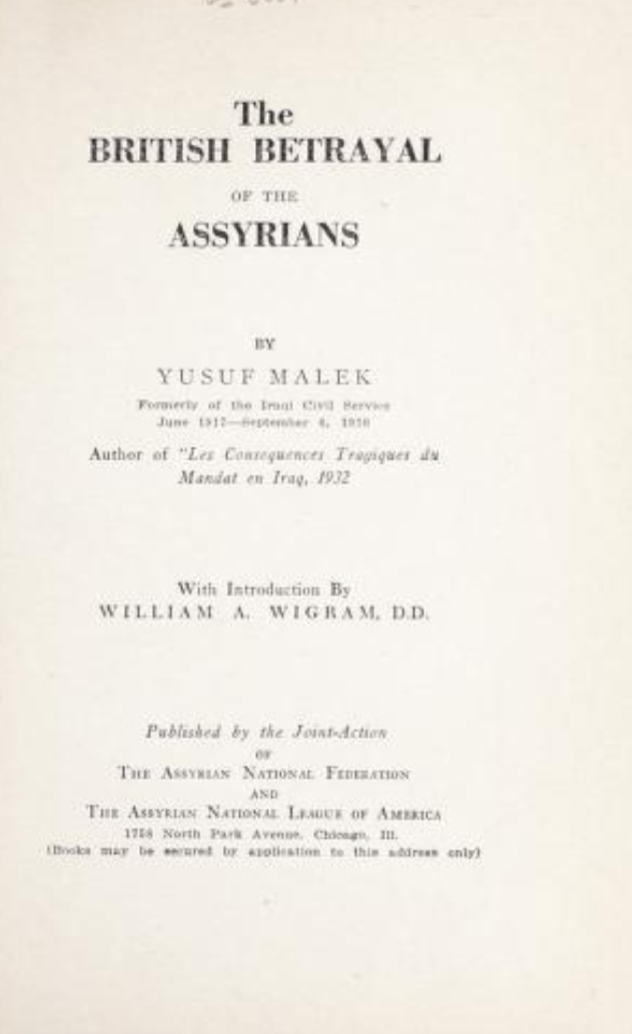
- Inside cover of The British Betrayal of the Assyrians
- Author: Yusuf Malek
- Language: English
- Genre: Non-fiction
- Publication date: 1935
- Publication place: United States

The British Betrayal of the Assyrians is a book published in 1935 written by Yusuf Malek.

As Malek was an Assyrian who fought alongside the British during World War I as an Interpreter officer, and later a government official in the subsequently established country of Iraq which was under British Administration until 1932, his writings come from first hand experiences.

Through the book, Malek reproduces letters from government officials while chronologically narrating the events which led to the formation of Iraq and the subsequent massacre of Assyrians, known as the Simele massacre.

== See also ==
- Assyrian Levies
