= Georges Garmou =

Georges Francis Garmou
- Archbishop of the Eparchy of Mosul
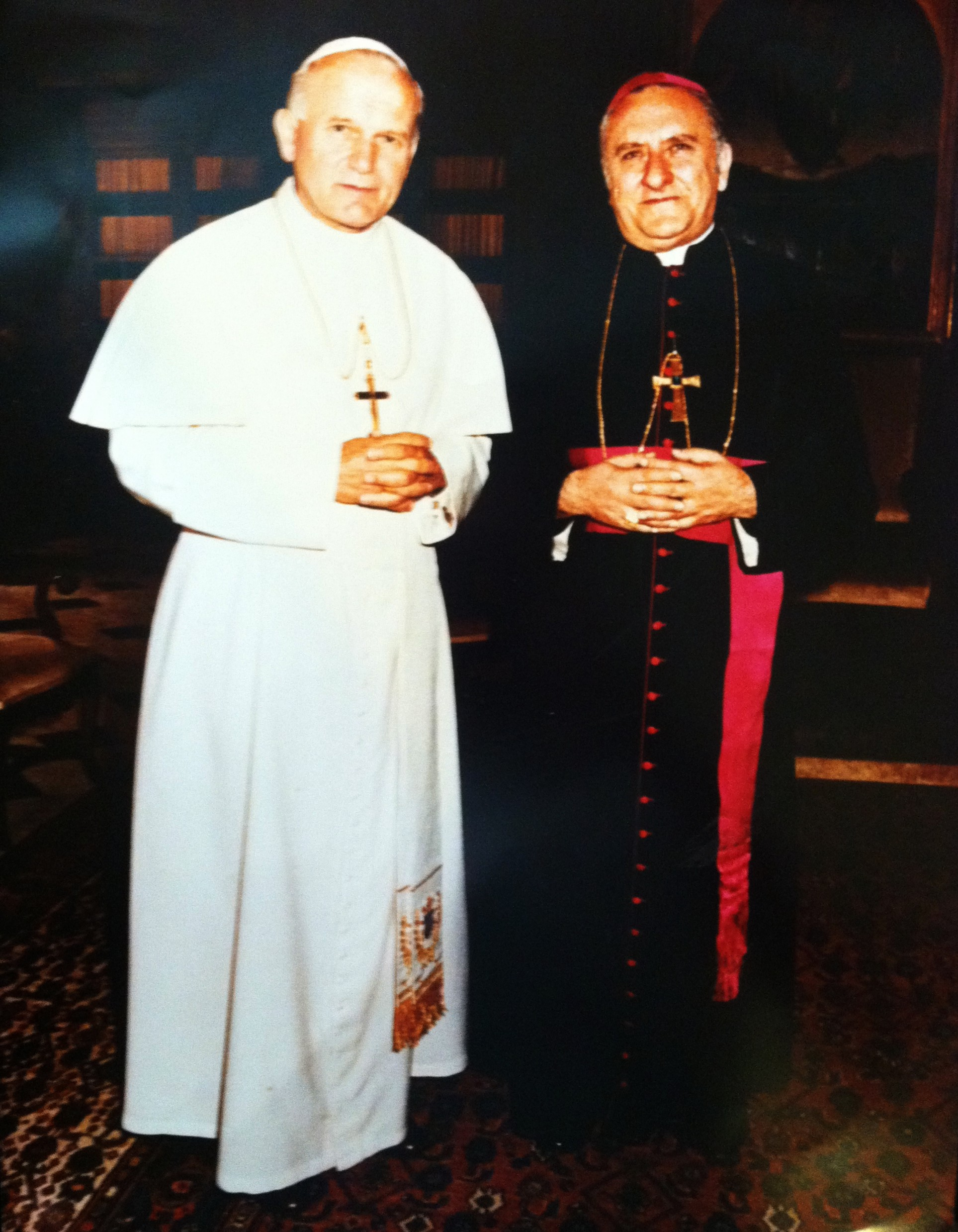
- Archbishop Garmo with Pope John Paul II
- See: Archeparchy of Mosul
- In office: 14 September 1980 – 9 September 1999
- Predecessor: Emmanuel Daddi
- Successor: Paulos Faraj Rahho
- Previous post: Priest

Orders
- Ordination: 8 December 1945
- Consecration: 14 September 1980 by Paul II Cheikho

Personal details
- Born: 8 December 1921 Tel Keppe, Iraq
- Died: 9 September 1999 (aged 77)

Mar Georges Francis Garmou (8 December 1921 – 9 September 1999) was an Iraqi Chaldean Catholic hierarch, who served as an Archbishop of Mosul (Mausiliensis Chaldaeorum) in Iraq from 14 September 1980 until his death on 9 September 1999.

== Biography ==
He was born Georges Francis Garmou in 1921 in Tel Keppe near Mosul, Iraq to a Chaldean Catholic Assyrian family. He entered the Chaldean Patriarchal Seminary in 1934. In 1939, he went to Rome to further his studies. He was ordained a priest there on his 24th birthday, 8 December 1945. He received a PhD in Divinity and a master's degree in Philosophy from the Pontifical Urbaniana University in Rome.

== Mission in Patriarchate Seminary In Iraq ==
During this time there was a scarcity of educated Catholic priests in Iraq. As Rev. Garmou was studying to receive a Ph.D in philosophy, he was requested by the Patriarchate to return to Iraq to minister to the growing Chaldean Patriarchal Seminary, which at the time lacked an extensive Theology and Philosophy department and staff. Rev. Garmou returned to Iraq in the summer of 1947 and taught at the Chaldean Patriarchal Seminary. He went on to lead the new Philosophy and Theological studies department there the following year.

Following his first year as a teacher, in 1949 he was elevated to rector of the Seminary, in which capacity he served until September 1960. During his tenure as Seminary Rector, Garmou was assisted by Patriarch Mar Raphael Bidawid before his elevation to the Patriarchate.

== Mission In USA ==
Patriarch Mar Paul II Cheikho appointed Garmou as pastor of Mother of God Chaldean Catholic Church in Southfield, Michigan, a suburb of Detroit.

In 1964, while serving as pastor of Mother of God Church, Garmou began fundraising drives, with the help of the Parishioners and Parish council he was able to purchase a 9-acre (36,000 m^{2}) plot of land in Southfield on Telegraph Road. After the completion of the church, he continued fundraising with the members of the Chaldean Iraqi American Association of Michigan (CIAAM) to raise funds to transfer ownership of 3 acres (12,000 m^{2}) of the church's 9-acre (36,000 m^{2}) property to the CIAAM to build a Chaldean social club, which would become Southfield Manor. In 1964, Garmo was transferred back to Baghdad to serve for two years before he returned to Southfield. On 27 September 1966, he was reappointed Pastor of Mother of God Church and Jacob Yasso was appointed Associate Pastor.

Under Garmou's supervision as Pastor of Mother of God Church there were many significant milestones for the Parish and the Chaldean community. In July 1972, the community celebrated the groundbreaking of a newly built Mother of God Parish, as well as a social hall that was dedicated by Patriarch Mar Paul II Cheikho on 15 May 1973. In September 1976, a convent for the Chaldean Sisters was opened on the church's property. Also, while serving as Pastor for Mother of God Church in September 1977, Garmo received Sarhad Yawsip Jammo as an Associate Pastor, who later be named the first bishop of the St. Peter the Apostle Diocese in California.

On 25 April 1979, he began building a new and larger Mother of God Church adjacent to the still standing church which would be converted to the present church's rectory. The new church was completed and dedicated on 13 September 1980 by Patriarch Mar Paulus Cheiko.

=== Archbishop of Mosul ===
On 14 September 1980, Garmou was consecrated Archbishop of Mosul by the Chaldean Patriarch. He served as Archbishop of Mosul until 9 September 1999, when he died of cancer, aged 78.

== Episcopal lineage ==
Archbishop Georges Garmou was co-consecrated by Mar Raphaël I Bidawid and Bishop Abdul-Ahad Sana.

Archbishop Georges Garmou was the Principal Co-Consecrator of: Archbishop Stéphane Katchou, Bishop Ibrahim Namo Ibrahim, Bishop Youssef Ibrahim Sarraf, and Archbishop Jibrail Kassab.

Preceded by Emmanuel Daddi †	Archbishop of Mosul; 1980–1999	Succeeded by Paulos Faraj Rahho
