= Michel Kassarji =

Lebanese Chaldean Catholic bishop (born 1956)

The Most Reverend Michel Kassarji
- Bishop of Beirut
- Church: Chaldean Catholic
- Diocese: Beirut
- Installed: 12 January 2001
- Predecessor: Yousif Thomas
- Previous post: Patriarchal Administrator of Beirut (2000–2001)

Orders
- Ordination: 6 May 1985
- Consecration: 10 March 2001 by Raphael I Bidawid

Personal details
- Born: Michel Kassarji; 1 July 1956 (age 70) Zahlé, Lebanon
- Education: Holy Spirit University of Kaslik, Pontifical Urban University, Pontifical Oriental Institute

Michel Kassarji (born 1 July 1956) is a Lebanese Chaldean Catholic hierarch, who has served as the Bishop of the Eparchy of Beirut since 2001.

== Early life and priesthood ==
Michel Kassarji was born on 1 July 1956 in Zahlé, Lebanon. He made his initial studies at the Holy Spirit University of Kaslik before moving to Rome to attend the Pontifical Urban University. He earned Licentiates in both Philosophy and Theology. Subsequently, he obtained a Licentiate in Canon Law from the Pontifical Oriental Institute in Rome.

He was ordained a priest on 6 May 1985. Following his ordination, he held various pastoral positions within the Chaldean community in Lebanon and engaged in academic pursuits. In January 2000 he was appointed as a Patriarchal Administrator of Beirut, and a year later, on 12 January 2001, Pope John Paul II confirmed his election by the Synod of the Chaldean Church as the Bishop of Beirut, a see that was vacant in this time. He was consecrated on 10 March 2001 by Patriarch Raphael I Bidawid, assisted by Antoine Audo and Georges Scandar.

== Episcopal ministry ==
Kassarji's tenure in Beirut has been characterized by the management of the Chaldean diaspora in Lebanon, particularly refugees fleeing conflict in Iraq. In August 2014, he led special prayer services in Beirut to advocate for Iraqi Christians facing persecution by the Islamic State.

In August 2019, Kassarji was elected as a member of the Permanent Synod of the Chaldean Church during a meeting in Baghdad for 5 years period. Also he was elected President of the Patriarchal Court of Appeal.

He has also been active in Lebanese political and inter-religious dialogue. In May 2025, Kassarji met with Samir Geagea, leader of the Lebanese Forces, to discuss the political challenges facing Lebanon and the necessity of Christian unity in the Middle East.
