= Maria Theresa Asmar =

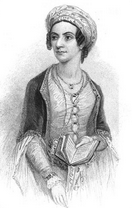
- Born: 1804; Nineveh, Ottoman Empire
- Died: before 1870; France

Maria Theresa Asmar (1804–c. 1870) was a Chaldean author, foremost known for her book Memoirs of a Babylonian Princess, which consists of two volumes and 720 pages. This book was composed some time in the early nineteenth–century, describing her travels through Assyria, Chaldea, Mesopotamia, Turkey, Syria, Lebanon, and Palestine and the harem system used in the Ottoman Empire. The book was finally translated into English in 1844. Maria Theresa Asmar died in France before the Franco-Prussian War, and was known as "Babylon's Princess" in Europe.

== Life ==
In describing her origins, Asmar notes: "I am descended from a family in the East, who derive their origin from the Brahmins, and have long professed the Christian religion in the church of Travancore; a church which, according to history, was originally planted by Saint Thomas, the apostle of our Lord in the Indies. My ancestors, some centuries ago, according to the tradition of our family, left Travancore for Persia, and finally migrated to Bagdad." She was an adherent of the Chaldean Catholic Church.

It is worth noting that, Asmar was a descendant of Mar Joseph IV Lazar Hindi "the Indian" of Diyarbakir, who led the Chaldean Catholic Church between 1759–1796. Asmar also claimed descent from Mar Joseph V Augustine Hindi "the Indian" (?–1827) of Diyarbakir, who was a successor of Mar Joseph IV. Indeed, the Asmar family's influence, particularly within clerical circles of the Chaldean Catholic Church are notable. Asmar also claimed Mar Basilius Asmar, the Archbishop of Diyarbakir as her uncle. According to the family records of the district of Tel-Keppe, the Asmar family settled in the district of Nineveh some time in the nineteenth–century. The family originally hailed from Diyarbakir in south-east Turkey.

Facing tremendous obstacles, Asmar, set up a school for women in Baghdad and welcomed with open arms western Christian missionaries, who then bribed the Turkish government to give them the licence for the school and forbid Maria to carry on with her project. Left frustrated and angry to have been treated this way by fellow Christians, she sought sanctuary with the Arab Bedouins. She set about recording their daily lives, everything from the weddings and celebrations to their assaults on other tribes. She explains in great detail Bedouin life.

In her book, she describes how her family fell to a plague and martyrdom because of their Christian faith. She eventually took refuge with Emir Beschir, the governor of Lebanon, at the Beiteddine Palace. From there she moved on to Europe where she was repeatedly robbed and fell into poverty. Her old friend from Lebanon, too, fell into poverty when he had been dethroned, thus leaving Maria without anything to sustain herself financially. After staying twelve years in Europe - she wrote her book, making an account of the events that led up to that point.

== Bibliography ==
- Memories of Maria Theresa Asmar An Iraqi Woman's Journey into Victorian London (2009), Emily Porter PhD (editor). Fadaat House for Publishing, Distributing and Printing, Amman, Jordan.
