= Najib Mikhael Moussa =

Iraqi Chaldean Catholic archbishop

Mar Najeeb Moussa Michaeel O.P.
- Archbishop of Mosul
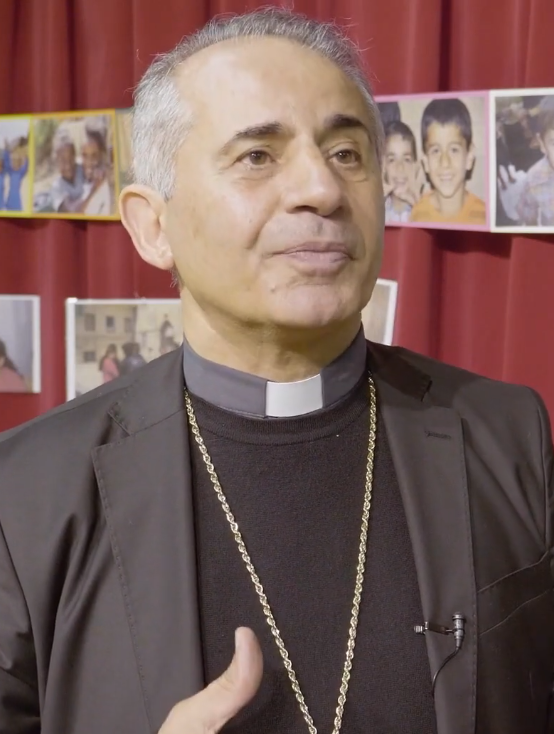
- See: Mosul
- Elected: 22 December 2018
- In office: 22 December 2018
- Predecessor: Amel Shimoun Nona

Orders
- Ordination: 16 May 1987 by Bishop Pierre Claverie
- Consecration: 18 January 2019 by Cardinal Louis Raphael I Sako

Personal details
- Born: Najeeb Moussa Michaeel Yonan al Sanati al Atrash; 9 September 1955 (age 70) Mosul, Iraq
- Denomination: Chaldean Catholic

Najeeb Moussa Michaeel O.P. or Najib Mikhael Moussa (born Najeeb Moussa Michaeel Yonan al Sanati al Atrash on 9 September 1955) is an Iraqi Chaldean Catholic hierarch. He was elected Chaldean archbishop of Mosul. Pope Francis granted him the ecclesiastica communio on 22 December 2018.

== Life ==
Najeeb Moussa Michaeel was born and raised in a Chaldean family in Mosul. He graduated from the Higher Petroleum Institute in Baghdad and became an engineer. He entered the Dominican Order and made his novitiate in Lille and Strasbourg, France. He vowed on December 4, 1981, and was ordained a priest on May 16, 1987, by Bishop Pierre Claverie of Oran, Algeria. He obtained a degree in practical theology and communication, as well as a master's degree in Catholic theology.

On 1 January 1988, he became archivist in Convent of the Dominicans of Mosul, Iraq. On September 9, 1990, he became director of the digital centre of Mosul's Eastern manuscripts. On 10 March 2001, he joined the nineval bishops interrogation commission. Later, he studied pastoral theology and communication at Babel College in Baghdad. In 2007 he was refugee in Qaraqosh, in the Nineveh Plain, due to the persecution of Christians in Mosul.

When the Islamic State arrived in Mosul on the night of August 6–7, 2014, Najeeb Moussa Michaeel fled to Erbil, Iraqi Kurdistan, taking about 800 manuscripts dating from the 13th to the 19th century, which he was transporting from Qaraqosh to Mosul. During his period of refuge, he digitized these manuscripts and helped Christian refugees in the Nineveh Plain. The saved documents were later exhibited at the National Archives and the Arab World Institute in Paris, as well as in Italy. Among these manuscripts were texts of Christian and Muslim spirituality written in Aramaic, Syriac, Arabic and Armenian. In addition, since 1990, Najeeb Michaeel has contributed to the safeguarding of 8,000 more manuscripts and 35,000 documents from the Church of the East.

He has also worked with displaced peoples throughout the area.

The synod of chaldean Catholic bishops elected Najeeb Moussa Michael archbishop of Mosul, at de facto post vacancy since the arrival of the Islamic state in 2014. Pope Francis confirmed this election on 22 December 2018.

In September 2020 he was nominated for the Sakharov Prize for Freedom of Thought, awarded annually by the European Parliament. Moussa was endorsed by the parliamentary group Identity and Democracy.

== Bibliography ==
- "Sauver les livres et les hommes" with Romain Gubert, Grasset, 2017
