= Dušan Drška =

Slovak weightlifter (1953–1999)

Personal information
- Nationality: Slovak
- Born: 12 June 1953 Myjava, Czechoslovakia
- Died: 24 December 1999 (aged 46) Trenčín, Slovakia

Sport
- Sport: Weightlifting

Dušan Drška (12 June 1953 – 24 December 1999) was a Slovak weightlifter. He competed at the 1976 Summer Olympics and the 1980 Summer Olympics.
