= Cathedral of Our Lady of Sorrows =

Chaldean cathedral in Baghdad, Iraq

- Arabic: كنيسة أم الأحزان
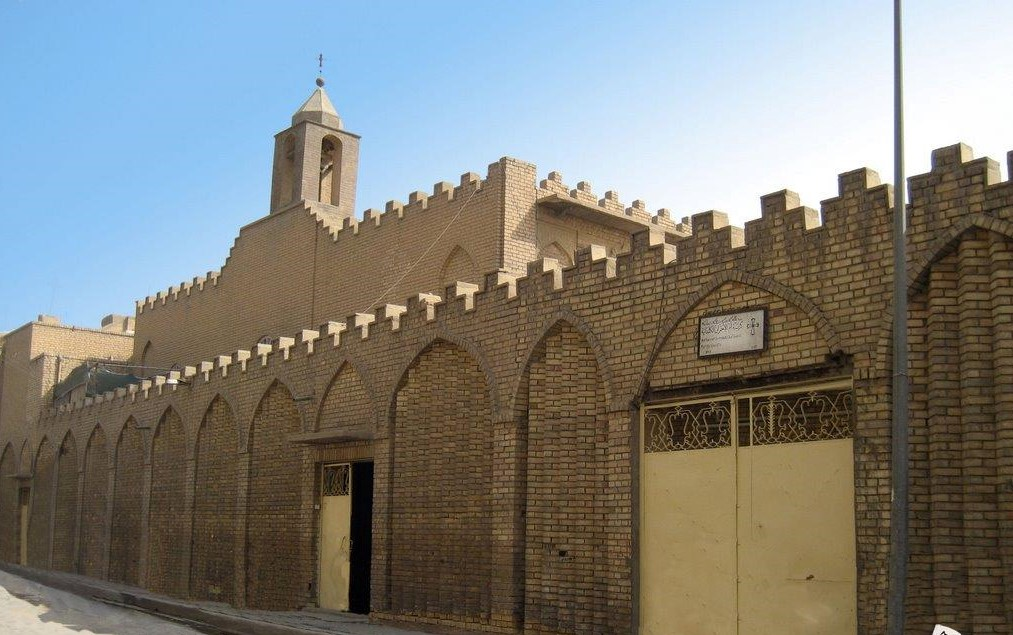
- Cathedral of Our Lady of Sorrows in Baghdad.
- Cathedral of Our Lady of Sorrows
- 33.338139°N 44.395528°E
- Location: Baghdad, Iraq
- Denomination: Chaldean Catholic Church

History
- Founded: 1843

The Old Cathedral of Our Lady of Sorrows, also called Cathedral of Mary Mother of Sorrows, (Arabic: كنيسة أم الأحزان, romanized: Umm al-Ahzan Church) is a Chaldean Catholic church located in Baghdad, Iraq, dedicated to Our Lady of Sorrows. Consecrated in 1898, it served as the seat of the Chaldean Catholic Patriarchate of Babylon of the Chaldean Catholic Church, an Eastern Catholic particular church sui iuris in full communion with the Holy See in Rome, and the rest of the worldwide Catholic Church.

== History ==
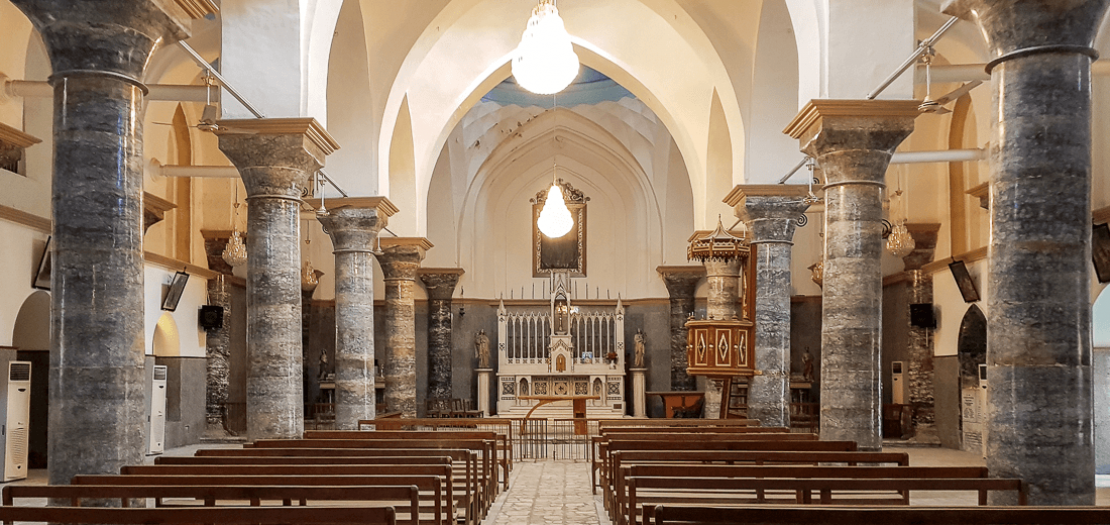
Interior of the Cathedral of Our Lady of Sorrows in Baghdad, Iraq.

The cathedral was first built in 1843 due to the growing community of Chaldean Christians in the Shorja area as a primitive build but the building was later rebuilt in a larger cathedral that could sit around 2,000 people. The Church is built in Iraqi architecture and includes terracotta materials. Due to its low area, the Church was flooded several times and its floor was rebuilt to be 5 meters higher in 1889. During World War II, Polish Soldiers helped craft the Church's high altar. The Church of Umm Al-Ahzan is considered a destination for all sects, even non-Christians, as people go to it to fulfill their needs and make vows in it.

By the middle of the 20th century, most Christians had left the Agd al-Nasara district and settled primarily in the new Karrada district. The Chaldean Patriarchate of Babylon decided to build a new cathedral on the site, now Cathedral of St. Joseph, and Patriarch Joseph Ghanima laid the foundation stone on the Feast of the Holy Cross in 1952.

He consecrated the new Chaldean Cathedral of Saint Joseph in 1956.

Due to the increasing acts of violence against Christians after the fall of Saddam Hussein's regime, more and more Christians left the city, and around 2018 only about 120 Christian families lived in the Aqd al-Nasara district. Only a few events and services are now being held in the building. Nevertheless, the church was restored and renovated in 2015 under Patriarch Louis Raphael I Sako.

== Architecture ==
The cathedral is built in ancient Mesopotamian architecture, which some other churches in Baghdad are also built in. The inside architecture of the church is built in the Latin style. The walls of the building are very thick which helps keeping in coolness in the summer and heat in the winter and some of the inscriptions in Arabic and French. The outside walls adorned are with bas-relief using bricks, representing ancient crosses, and other religious ornaments. There are many doors that lead to the inside which includes pillars and arches in Mosul marble which were carried to Baghdad using the Tigris river.
