= Yousif Thomas =

Chaldean Catholic archbishop (1934–1999)

His Excellency Yousif Thomas
- Archbishop-Bishop of Beirut
- Church: Chaldean Catholic Church
- Archdiocese: Beirut
- See: Beirut
- Appointed: 24 October 1995
- Term ended: 22 December 1999
- Predecessor: Raphael Bidawid
- Successor: Michel Kassarji
- Previous post: Archbishop of Basra (1983–1995)

Orders
- Ordination: 22 December 1960
- Consecration: 5 February 1984 by Paul II Cheikho

Personal details
- Born: 2 August 1934 Alqosh, Kingdom of Iraq
- Died: 22 December 1999 (aged 65) Lebanon
- Buried: Alqosh, Iraq
- Education: Pontifical Lateran University

Yousif Thomas (2 August 1934 – 22 December 1999) was an Iraqi-born Chaldean Catholic hierarch who served as Archbishop of Basra from 1983 to 1995 and subsequently as Archbishop-Bishop of Beirut from 1995 until his death in 1999. The Vatican's Acta Apostolicae Sedis records that on 24 October 1995 he was transferred from the Metropolitan Church of Basra to the Cathedral Church of Beirut, retaining his personal title of archbishop.

== Early life and education ==
Thomas was born in Alqosh in northern Iraq on 2 August 1934. He entered the seminary in Mosul in 1949. In 1953 he was sent to Rome to continue his studies, where he obtained a degree in philosophy and theology.

He was ordained a priest on 22 December 1960 and subsequently specialized in canon law at the Pontifical Lateran University, where he obtained a doctorate.

== Episcopal ministry ==
Thomas served in Alqosh from 1966. He was appointed as archbishop on 29 November 1983 and consecrated an archbishop on 5 February 1984 by Patriarch Paul II Cheikho and became Archbishop of Basra and the South, serving in the Chaldean metropolitan see until 1995.

The episcopal succession records for the Chaldean Catholic Archeparchy of Basra give his tenure as Archbishop of Basra from 29 November 1983 until 24 October 1995.

=== Transfer to Beirut ===
On 24 October 1995, Thomas was transferred from the Metropolitan Church of Basra to the Cathedral Church of Beirut by the Chaldean episcopal synod. The Vatican record states explicitly that he retained his personal title of archbishop.

He subsequently served the Chaldean Catholic community in Lebanon. The Chaldeans of Lebanon records him as having moved to Lebanon after his service in Basra.

== Death and burial ==
Thomas died in Lebanon on 22 December 1999. His death is also recorded by Catholic-Hierarchy on 22 December 1999, which lists him as Archbishop of Basra, while the Chaldeans of Lebanon gives 21 December as the date of death. He was buried in Alqosh.
