= Chaldean Catholic Archeparchy of Baghdad =

Archeparchy of Baghdad Archeparchia Babylonensis Chaldaeorum

Location
- Country: Iraq
- Metropolitan: Chaldean Catholic Patriarchate of Baghdad
- Headquarters: Baghdad, Iraq

Statistics
- Population: (as of 2023); 200,000
- Parishes: 29

Information
- Denomination: Catholic Church
- Sui iuris church: Chaldean Catholic Church
- Rite: Chaldean Rite
- Established: 20 April 1553; 473 years ago
- Cathedral: Chaldean Cathedral of St. Joseph in Baghdad
- Secular priests: 20 (18 Diocesan, 2 Religious Orders)
- Language: Syriac

Current leadership
- Pope: Leo XIV
- Patriarch: Paul III Nona
- Archeparch: Paul III Nona

The Chaldean Catholic Archeparchy (or Archdiocese) of Baghdad is the Metropolitan, proper Archeparchy of the Chaldean Catholic Patriarch of Babylon, with cathedral see in the Iraqi capital Baghdad.

As the Patriarch is its Metropolitan Archeparch, it has no other Ordinary of its own.

== History ==
It was established on 20 April 1553 as the Metropolitan Archdiocese of Baghdad (Latin Babylonen[sis] Chaldæorum) of the Chaldean Catholic Church, an Eastern Catholic Church using the Syro-Oriental Rite in the Chaldean language.

On 17 January 1954, it lost territory to establish the Chaldean Catholic Archdiocese of Bassorah (Archeparchy of Basra), in southern Iraq.

== Auxiliary bishops ==
Former Auxiliary eparchs of Baghdad :

- Auxiliary Bishop: Archbishop Yousef Ghanima (1938 – 1947.09.17), later Patriarch of Babylon
- Auxiliary Bishop: Archbishop Thomas Michel Bidawid (1970.08.24 – 1971.03.29), Titular Archbishop of Nisibis of the Chaldeans (1970.08.24 – 1971.03.29); previously Archeparch of Ahvaz of the Chaldeans (Iran) (1966.01.06 – 1970.08.24)

== Statistics ==
In 1913 the diocese had 11 qashe (priests), 1 church and 7,260 civilians according to Joseph Tfinkdji.

Chaldean communities in the archdiocese of Baghdad, 1913

Name of Village	Name in Syriac	Number of Believers	Number of Priests	Number of Churches	Name of Village	Name in Syriac	Number of Believers	Number of Priests	Number of Churches
Baghdad	ܒܓܕܕ	7,000	9	1	Kut		100	1	0
Amara		160	1	0	Total		7,260	11	1

== See also ==
- Catholic Church in Iran
- Chaldean Catholic Church
- Cathedral of St. Joseph (Baghdad)
