= Tage Jørgensen =

Danish fencer

Personal information
- Nationality: Danish
- Born: 15 October 1918 Copenhagen, Denmark
- Died: 9 December 1999 (aged 81)

Sport
- Sport: Fencing
- Team: Akademisk Fægteklub

Tage Jørgensen (15 October 1918 – 9 December 1999) was a Danish fencer. He competed in the team foil event at the 1948 Summer Olympics.
