= Horst Matthai Quelle =

Spanish language German philosopher (1912–1999)

- Born: 30 January 1912; Hanover, German Empire
- Died: 27 December 1999 (aged 87); Tijuana, Mexico

Horst Matthai Quelle (30 January 1912 – 27 December 1999) was a Spanish-speaking German philosopher.

== Philosophy ==
In the introduction to the compilation Philosophical Texts (1989-1999) his philosophy is summarized as follows:

1. The exterior world is a phenomenon of the individual since it is consciousness which gives form to the perceived world.
2. There are institutions and historical currents that strive to sabotage the practical application of this knowledge. These are mainly the church, the state science and western philosophy when it subordinates itself to these three agents.
3. To acquire consciousness that the world is a phenomenon of the individual and that there are institutions and historical currents that occult this wisdom means becoming responsible for the world, thought and language. If the individual gives form to the world, he is those objects, the others and the whole universe, as such, he has to rebel against the forces which intend to convince him that he is only part of the world, and not the whole world.

One of his main views was a "theory of infinite worlds" which for him was developed by pre-socratic philosophers. For him reality is a product of consciousness and each individual consciousness is a world of itself. Another important concept in his philosophy is one he called "non-mutuality" which expresses that which does not permit communication between individuals.

== Selected works ==
Published books and compilations

- "Pensar y ser I. Ensayo de una fenomenología metafísica", Universidad Autónoma de Baja California, Mexicali, (1996). La edición original cuenta con 176 páginas. El tiraje fue de únicamente 300 ejemplares.
- "Pensar y ser II. La Escuela de Mileto", Universidad Autónoma de Baja California, Mexicali, (1995). La edición original cuenta con 125 páginas. El tiraje fue de sólo 300 ejemplares.
- "Pensar y ser III. Heráclito, el obscuro", Universidad Autónoma de Baja California, Mexicali, (1997). La edición original cuenta con 230 páginas. La edición contó con mil ejemplares.
- "Pensar y ser IV. La teoría parmenídea del pensar", Universidad Autónoma de Baja California, Mexicali, (1990). La edición original cuenta con 78 páginas. El tiraje fue de 750 ejemplares.
- "Textos filosóficos (1989-1999)", Universidad Autónoma de Baja California, Mexicali, ISBN 970-9051-32-6,(2002)
- "Todos los pensamientos son verdaderos", Verdehalago, Ciudad de México, (2012).

Articles

- "El hombre y sus fronteras. Una visión filosófica", artículo en Estudios sobre las Culturas Contemporaneas, de la Universidad de Colima, número 11, (1991)
- "Filosofía y literatura", artículo en Yubai, de la UABC, número 8, (1994)
- "Organización interempresarial y empleo", artículo en Paradigmas, de la UABC, número 10, (1995)
- "Amerasia (una reflexión filosófica)", artículo en Cuad. Am., número 6, (1995)
- "El papel crucial de las instituciones humanísticas fronterizas de México para la defensa de la cultura latinoamericana", artículo, (199?)
- "El humanismo como problema humano", artículo en Semillero, de la UABC, número 31, (2000)

Talks

- "¿Son Compatibles el Concepto de Paideia y la Idea de lo Absoluto?", ponencia, (199?)
- "The Pseudo-concepts Phenomenon and ΛΟΓΟΣ in the Phenomenological Philosophies: A Viable Alternative", ponencia, (199?)
- "Life as Eontopoiesis and Self-Individualization", ponencia, (199?)
- "Crisis económica: microeconomía versus macroeconomía", ponencia presentada al Foro de Análisis: La crisis económica, oportunidades y retos para Tijuana, Tijuana, (1995)
- "Industria y escuela: un problema de vinculación", ponencia presentada al Comité de Vinculación de la CALACINTRA, Tijuana, (1992)

Others

- "Las Discrepancias en las calificaciones de las diferentes materias del currículo correspondiente al año 1ª. de la preparatoria Benemerito de las Americas", Brigham Young University, (1978)
