= Chaldean Catholic Archeparchy of Basra =

Eastern Catholic archeparchy in Iraq

Coordinates: 30.4833°N 47.8167°E

The Chaldean Catholic Archeparchy (or Archdiocese) of Basra (or Bassorah) is a non-metropolitan Archeparchy (Eastern Catholic archdiocese) of the Chaldean Catholic Church (Syro-Oriental Rite, Syriac or Aramaic language) in southern Iraq.

It is subject to the Chaldean Catholic Patriarch of Babylon, without suffragan.

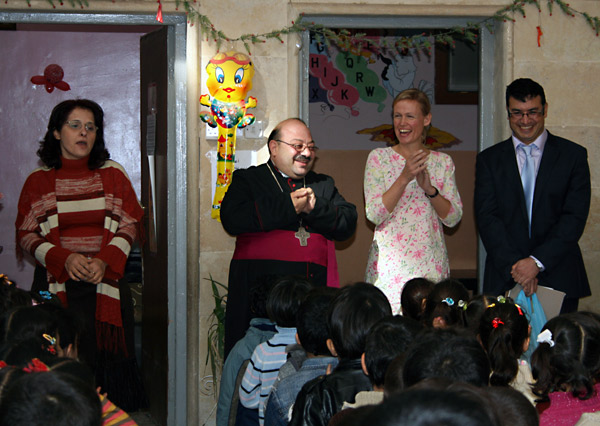
Bishop of Basra

Its cathedral episcopal see Cathedral of Our Lady, is in Al Basrah.

== History ==
In 280 AD it was established as Diocese of Perat-Maishan (Perâth Maishân), which was promoted in 410 to the Metropolitan Archdiocese of Perat-Maishan. It was suppressed in 1200.

In 1860 it was nominally restored as Titular archbishopric of Perat-Maishan, and was again suppressed in 1895.

On 17 January 1954, it was fully restored as residential Chaldean Catholic Archeparchy of Basra (Bassorah), on territory split off from the Metropolitan Chaldean Catholic Archeparchy of Baghdad.

== Episcopal ordinaries ==
(all Chaldean rite)

=== Ancient residential see of Perat-Maishan ===
Eparchs (Bishops) of Perat-Maishan

- David (? – 285)
- Yohannan (315? – ?)

Metropolitan Archeparchs (Archbishops) of Perat-Maishan

- Milis (410? – ?)
- Zabda (? - 424 – ?)

=== Former titular Archdiocese of Perat-Maishan ===
Titular Archeparchs (Archbishops) of Perat-Maishan

- Thomas Rokuss (1860 – 1885), no further office
- Jacques-Michel Naamo (1888.04.27 – death 1895), emeritate as former Bishop of Seert of the Chaldeans (1885.03.24 – 1888.04.27)

=== Modern residential see of Basra (Bassorah) ===
Archeparchs (Archbishops) of Basra (Bassorah)

- Joseph Gogué (1954.02.08 – death 1971.01.15)
- Gabriel Ganni (1971.01.15 – death 1981.11.10), succeeding as former Coadjutor Archeparch of Bassorah of the Chaldeans (1966.03.02 – 1971.01.15); previously Auxiliary Eparch of Beirut of the Chaldeans (Lebanon) (1956.03.19 – 1959) and Titular Bishop of Gargara (1956.03.19 – 1964.02.12), promoted Coadjutor Eparch of Beirut of the Chaldeans (1959 – 1964.02.12), succeeding as Bishop of Beirut of the Chaldeans (Lebanon) (1964.02.12 – 1966.03.02), then Titular Archbishop of Pessinus (1966.03.02 – 1971.01.15)
- Stéphane Katchou (1981.11.10 – 1983.11.29), succeeding as former Coadjutor Archbishop of Bassorah of the Chaldeans (Iraq) (1980.10.03 – 1981.11.10) & Titular Archbishop of Anbar of the Chaldeans (1980.10.03 – 1981.11.10); later Archbishop-Bishop of Zaku of the Chaldeans (Iraq) (1983.11.29 – death 1987.11.08)
- Yousif Thomas (1983.11.29 – 1995.10.24)
- Jibrail Kassab (1995.10.24 – 2006.10.21), later Archbishop-Bishop of Saint Thomas the Apostle of Sydney of the Chaldeans (Australia) (2006.10.21 – 2015.01.15)
- Habib Al-Naufali (2014.01.11 – ...)

== See also ==
- Catholic Church in Iran
- Chaldean Catholic Church
