= Chaldean Cathedral of St. Joseph =

Catholic cathedral in Baghdad, Iraq

Coordinates: 33.3014°N 44.4282°E

The Cathedral of Saint Joseph (Arabic: كاتدرائية القديس يوسف الكلدانية), also known as Mar Yusif (Arabic: كاتدرائية مار يوسف or كنيسة مار يوسف الكلدانية), is a church in the Iraqi capital of Baghdad, consecrated in 1956. It is the cathedral of the Chaldean Catholic Archdiocese of Baghdad and of the Patriarchate of Baghdad (until 2022, the Patriarchate of Babylon) of the Chaldean Catholic Church.

== Location ==
The Chaldean Catholic Cathedral of Saint Joseph is located in the Karrada district, at an elevation of 38 meters, approximately 900 meters east of the eastern bank of the Tigris River and about 600 meters south of the Syriac Catholic Cathedral of Sayidat al-Nejat.

== History ==
The first Chaldean Catholic church was completed in 1843 in the Agd al-Nasara district of Baghdad, but it had to be rebuilt because of flooding from the Tigris River. In 1889, the Mater Dolorosa Cathedral, built five meters higher, was constructed on the same site and consecrated in 1898. It served as Baghdad's Chaldean cathedral until the 1950s.

By the middle of the 20th century, most Christians had left the Agd al-Nasara district and settled primarily in the new Karrada district. The Chaldean Patriarchate of Babylon decided to build a new cathedral there, and Patriarch Joseph Ghanima laid the foundation stone on the Feast of the Holy Cross in 1952.

He consecrated the new Chaldean Cathedral of Saint Joseph in 1956. Since then, the cathedral has undergone several renovations, the most recent in 2018, under Patriarch Louis Raphael I Sako.

== Architecture ==
The Chaldean Cathedral of Saint Joseph is oriented along a northeast–southwest axis. A dome is located at the southwestern end, while the remainder of the nave is covered by a gabled roof.

The main entrance is located at the southeastern end of the building, with a slender rectangular bell tower to its right (northwest). Above the entrance is a statue of Saint Joseph. To the left of the statue, an inscription in Syriac (Aramaic), to the right in Arabic, and on the bell tower in English reads “Saint Joseph Chaldean Cathedral.”

The church building is made of reinforced concrete and has a simple design. From the outside, it resembles a basilica, but it consists of a single large hall without columns. On the northwestern side there is a side aisle, above which numerous windows allow light to enter the church. Additional windows are located above the entrance and in the southwestern dome above the altar.

== Diocese and Bishop ==
The Chaldean Cathedral of Saint Joseph is the cathedral church of the Chaldean Patriarchate of Baghdad (Patriarchatus Bagdadiensis Chaldaeorum) and of the Chaldean Catholic Archdiocese of Baghdad (Archidioecesis Bagdadiensis Chaldaeorum).

The Catholic website GCatholic.org also lists the Chaldean Mater Dolorosa Cathedral in Agd al-Nasara as the seat of the Patriarchate and the Archdiocese. However, according to other sources, including the Mesopotamia Heritage organization, the Church of Saint Joseph in the Karrada district—which also bears the inscription “Saint Joseph Chaldean Cathedral” in three languages—is the Chaldean Cathedral of Baghdad.

It was here that the new Chaldean Patriarch of Babylon, Louis Raphael I Sako, was enthroned in 2015.

The Patriarchate of Babylon had approximately 85,000 faithful in 21 parishes with 59 priests in 1949, and approximately 150,000 faithful in 22 parishes with 28 priests in 1970.

The Archdiocese of Baghdad comprised approximately 250,000 faithful in 28 parishes with 34 priests in 1980, approximately 481,000 faithful in 30 parishes with 30 priests in 1990, approximately 130,000 faithful in 26 parishes with 34 priests in 2004, and approximately 150,000 faithful in 18 parishes with 22 priests in 2015.

In 2017, there were approximately 200,000 faithful in 18 parishes with 15 priests.

== Potential for confusion ==
There is another Chaldean church dedicated to Saint Joseph in Baghdad, the Church of Saint Joseph, Patron of Workers (كنيسة مار يوسف شفيع العمال), located on the eastern side of “Spring Street” (شارع الربيع), approximately 300 meters south of “Jordan Street” (شارع الأردن) and the “Police Tunnel” (نفق الشرطة), in the al-Amiriya district.

There is also another Catholic cathedral dedicated to Saint Joseph in Baghdad, the Latin Cathedral of Saint Joseph, located not far from the former Chaldean Mater Dolorosa Cathedral.

As recently as 2020, the Catholic website GCatholic.org incorrectly listed the location of the Latin Cathedral of Saint Joseph as the location of the Chaldean Cathedral.

There is also a second Chaldean Catholic cathedral dedicated to Saint Joseph in Iraq, the Chaldean Cathedral of Saint Joseph in Ankawa, near Erbil.
