= Mikha Pola Maqdassi =

Iraqi Chaldean Catholic bishop (born 1949)

Most Reverend Mikha Pola Maqdassi
- Titular Bishop of Seert of the Chaldeans, Auxiliary Bishop Emeritus of Baghdad
- Church: Chaldean Catholic Church
- Installed: 8 October 2022
- Term ended: 18 July 2024
- Other post: Bishop of Alquoch (2001–2022)

Orders
- Ordination: 1973
- Consecration: 1 February 2002 by Raphael I Bidawid

Personal details
- Born: Mikha Pola Maqdassi; 9 March 1949 (age 77) Alqosh, Kingdom of Iraq

Mikha Pola Maqdassi (born 9 March 1949) is an Iraqi Chaldean Catholic hierarch, who served as the Auxiliary Bishop of the Chaldean Catholic Archeparchy of Baghdad since 2022 until 2024. He previously served as the Bishop of the Chaldean Catholic Eparchy of Alquoch from 2001 to 2022.

== Biography ==
Mikha Pola Maqdassi was born in Alqosh, Iraq, on 9 March 1949. He made his theological and philosophical studies in preparation for the priesthood at the Dominican Seminary and was ordained a priest in 1973.

On 14 December 2001, Pope John Paul II confirmed his election by the Synod of Bishops of the Chaldean Church as the Bishop of Alquoch, succeeding Babai Tomarki. He received his episcopal consecration on 1 February 2002 from Patriarch Raphael I Bidawid, assisted by André Sana and Abdul-Ahad Sana.

He was a participant in the electoral Synod of Bishops of the Chaldean Catholic Church in January 2013, which elected the new Patriarch Louis Raphaël I Sako.

On 8 October 2022, Patriarch Louis Raphaël I Sako, with the consent of the Synod of Bishops of the Patriarchal Church of Baghdad and after having informed the Apostolic See, has transferred Maqdassi into the position of Auxiliary Bishop of the Patriarchal See of Baghdad. He was concurrently assigned the titular see of Seert of the Chaldeans. He retired from this office, because of age limit, on 18 July 2024.
