= Chaldean Catholic Eparchy of Saint Thomas the Apostle of Sydney =

Eastern Catholic eparchy in Australia

Coordinates: 33°52′00″S 151°12′27″E

Eparchy of Saint Thomas the Apostle of Sydney

Location
- Country: Australia
- Metropolitan: Immediately subject to the Holy See

Statistics
- Population: (as of 2023); 35,000 (n/a%)
- Parishes: 7

Information
- Denomination: Catholic
- Sui iuris church: Chaldean Catholic Church
- Rite: Chaldean Rite
- Established: 2006
- Cathedral: St. Thomas the Apostle Cathedral

Current leadership
- Pope: Leo XIV
- Patriarch: Paul III Nona
- Bishop: Sede Vacante
- Bishops emeritus: Amel Nona; Jibrail Kassab

Website
- Official website

The Eparchy of Saint Thomas the Apostle is a Chaldean Catholic diocese in Sydney, Australia, and is immediately subject to the Holy See.

The eparchy was created in 2006. Archbishop Jibrail Kassab was appointed bishop at that time. In 2015, he was succeeded by Archbishop Amel Shamon Nona. The see has been vacant since April 12, 2026.

== Parishes ==
- St. Thomas the Apostle Chaldean & Assyrian Catholic Cathedral, Bossley Park, New South Wales, Australia
- St. Mary's Assumption Chaldean Catholic Church, Fairfield, New South Wales, Australia
- St. Joseph Chaldean Catholic Church, Mount Druitt, New South Wales, Australia
- St. George Chaldean Catholic Church, Campbellfield, Victoria, Australia
- Our Lady Guardian of Plants Chaldean Catholic Church, Campbellfield, Victoria, Australia
- St Addai Chaldean Catholic Church, Manukau, Auckland, New Zealand
- St Ephrem Chaldean Catholic Mission, Narre Warren East, Victoria, Australia

== See also ==
- Roman Catholicism in Australia
