= František Ipser =

Czech footballer and manager (1927–1999)

Personal information
- Date of birth: 16 August 1927
- Place of birth: Chrudim, Czechoslovakia
- Date of death: 9 December 1999 (aged 72)
- Place of death: Czech Republic
- Position: Defender

Youth career
- SK Novo Chrudim

Senior career*
Years	Team	Apps	(Gls)
1946–1948	Slavia Prague		
1948–1950	ATK Prague		
1950–1956	Slavia Prague		
1957–1959	Bohemians Prague		
1960–1961	Slavia Prague		

International career
1951–1953	Czechoslovakia	4	(0)

Managerial career
- 1964–1966: Slavia Prague
- 1970–1971: Baník Ostrava
- Spartak Ústí nad Labem
- Česká Lípa
- Neratovice
- UD Příbram
- VTŽ Chomutov
- Kovostroj Děčín
- * Club domestic league appearances and goals

František Ipser (16 August 1927 – 9 December 1999) was a Czech football manager and former player.

As a player, Ipser played mostly for Slavia Prague, and won the Czechoslovak First League with Slavia in 1947. In 1948-1950 he played for ATK Prague as a part of his compulsory military service. Ipser made a total of 148 appearances in the Czechoslovak First League, scoring 5 goals. After finishing his active career, Ipser started to work as a football manager. He coached Slavia Prague in 1964-1966 and Baník Ostrava in 1970–1971. In latter years he also coached several lower division teams.
