= Paul III Nona =

Patriarch of Baghdad of the Chaldeans since 2026

Mar Paul III Nona
- Patriarch of Baghdad of the Chaldeans
- Province: Baghdad
- See: Baghdad
- Elected: 12 April 2026
- Installed: 29 May 2026
- Predecessor: Louis Raphaël I Sako
- Other post: Member of the Dicastery for Oriental Churches
- Previous posts: Chaldean Catholic Archbishop of Saint Thomas the Apostle of Sydney (2015–2026); Archbishop of Mosul (2010–2015)

Orders
- Ordination: 11 January 1991
- Consecration: 8 January 2010 by Emmanuel III Delly

Personal details
- Born: Amel Shamoon Nona; 1 November 1967 (age 59) Alqosh, Iraq
- Denomination: Chaldean Catholic
- Residence: Baghdad
- Education: Pontifical Lateran University
- Coat of arms: Paul III Nona's coat of arms

Paul III Nona (born Amel Shamoon Nona; 1 November 1967) is an Iraqi Catholic hierarch who has served as Chaldean Catholic Patriarch of Baghdad since 2026. He previously served as Archbishop-Bishop of Saint Thomas the Apostle of Sydney from 2015 to 2026, and as Archbishop of Mosul from 2010 to 2015, including his exile amid the ISIS takeover in his region.

== Early life ==
Nona, an Assyro-Chaldean, was born in Alqosh in 1967. After completing his secondary education in 1986, he entered the Chaldean Patriarchal Seminary and was ordained priest on 11 January 1991 in Baghdad. From 1993 to 1997 he was parochial vicar at Alqosh, then pastor until 2000. In 2000, he enrolled at the Pontifical Lateran University. In 2005 he obtained a doctorate in theological anthropology and returned home. From 2005 he served as a professor of anthropology at the Babel College. Later, he was named vicar general of the Chaldean Catholic eparchy of Alqosh. He speaks Arabic, Syriac, English and Italian.

== Archbishop of Mosul ==
On 5 May 2009, the Synod of Bishops of the Chaldean Catholic Church elected Nona as Archeparch of Mosul. Pope Benedict XVI gave his consent to Nona's election on 13 November 2009. He was consecrated a bishop on 8 January 2010 by Emmanuel III Delly, patriarch of Babylon, as principal consecrator. At the age of 42, Nona was the youngest Chaldean Catholic archbishop in the world.

Speaking on the violence in Iraq in 2014, Nona said that all the Christians who were still living there had fled. Nona, corroborated this while speaking with the worldwide Catholic relief service Aid to the Church in Need: "All the faithful have left the city. Who knows whether they will ever be able to return. In 2003 there were still 35,000 faithful living in Mosul. Three thousand were still there in early 2014. Now probably not one is left here, and that is tragic." Nona went into exile because of the violence.

Shortly after his exile began, Nona gave an interview in which he warned the West against accepting Muslims into their communities:

Please, try to understand us. Your liberal and democratic principles are worth nothing here. You must consider again our reality in the Middle East, because you are welcoming in your countries an ever growing number of Muslims. Also you are in danger. You must take strong and courageous decisions, even at the cost of contradicting your principles. You think all men are equal, but that is not true: Islam does not say that all men are equal. Your values are not their values. If you do not understand this soon enough, you will become the victims of the enemy you have welcomed in your home.

Speaking about his experience later, following his election as Patriarch of the Chaldean Church, Nona said "It was a very difficult but defining time. Being a bishop in a city in constant danger, where every week or month someone was killed, left a deep mark on me. But it also taught me that the faith of our people is their true anchor. Despite everything, they kept their hope alive. To suffer for being a faithful believer certainly deepens your way of looking at life. That is the best contribution of our people: they suffered immensely, yet they have this deep, unshakable belief that their lives must be full of faith and Christian principles."

== Archbishop of Australia and New Zealand ==
Nona was appointed Eparch of St Thomas the Apostle of Sydney of the Chaldeans on 15 January 2015. His installation took place on 7 March 2015. He succeeded Jibrail Kassab following his retirement.

He remained archbishop until his election as Patriarch of Baghdad of the Chaldeans on 12 April 2026.

Reflecting on his experience in Oceania, he said that "the original home of our Church is in the Middle East, particularly in Iraq, but today the majority of our people live in the diaspora. Having lived both realities – the agony of Mosul and the life of a shepherd in Australia – I know it is not easy, but it is not impossible. My mission is to build a bridge, particularly for the new generations born abroad who are searching for their roots, their identity, and their faith."

== Patriarch of Baghdad ==
On 12 April 2026, the Synod of Bishops of the Chaldean Catholic Church elected Nona Patriarch of Baghdad. He took the name "Paul III" upon his election. In a letter dated 24 April 2026, Pope Leo XIV assented to his election and granted Nona the ecclesiastica communio (ecclesiastical communion).

On 9 May 2026, when asked why he chose his regnal name, he replied, "I chose the name polis in reference to two persons. The first is Saint Paul, because he is a profound figure — a great theologian and a teacher who conveys the faith with depth, while at the same time carrying an apostolic zeal to proclaim this theology and to teach the faith to others. The second person is Patriarch Polis II Cheikho, who was an example of humility and pastoral care. For these two reasons, I chose the name Paul."

He was installed as Patriarch on 29 May 2026 in St. Joseph Chaldean Cathedral in Baghdad. On 30 May 2026, Pope Leo appointed Nona a member of the Dicastery for the Eastern Churches.

In an interview following his election, the Patriarch made an appeal to the international community. "What we ask of the international community is simply respect: respect for our peoples and for our sovereignty, so that we can live without the constant threat of war. We want to look at our young people and tell them: 'you have a future,' but for that, we need the world to stop turning our land into a constant battlefield."

Catholic Church titles
Preceded by Louis Raphaël I Sako	Patriarch of Baghdad; 12 April 2026 – present	Incumbent
Preceded by Jibrail Kassab	Chaldean Catholic Eparch of Saint Thomas the Apostle of Sydney; 15 January 2015 – 12 April 2026	Sede vacante
Preceded by Paulos Faraj Rahho	Chaldean Catholic Archeparch of Mosul; 13 November 2009 – 15 January 2015	Succeeded by Najib Mikhael Moussa
