= Interpreter officer =

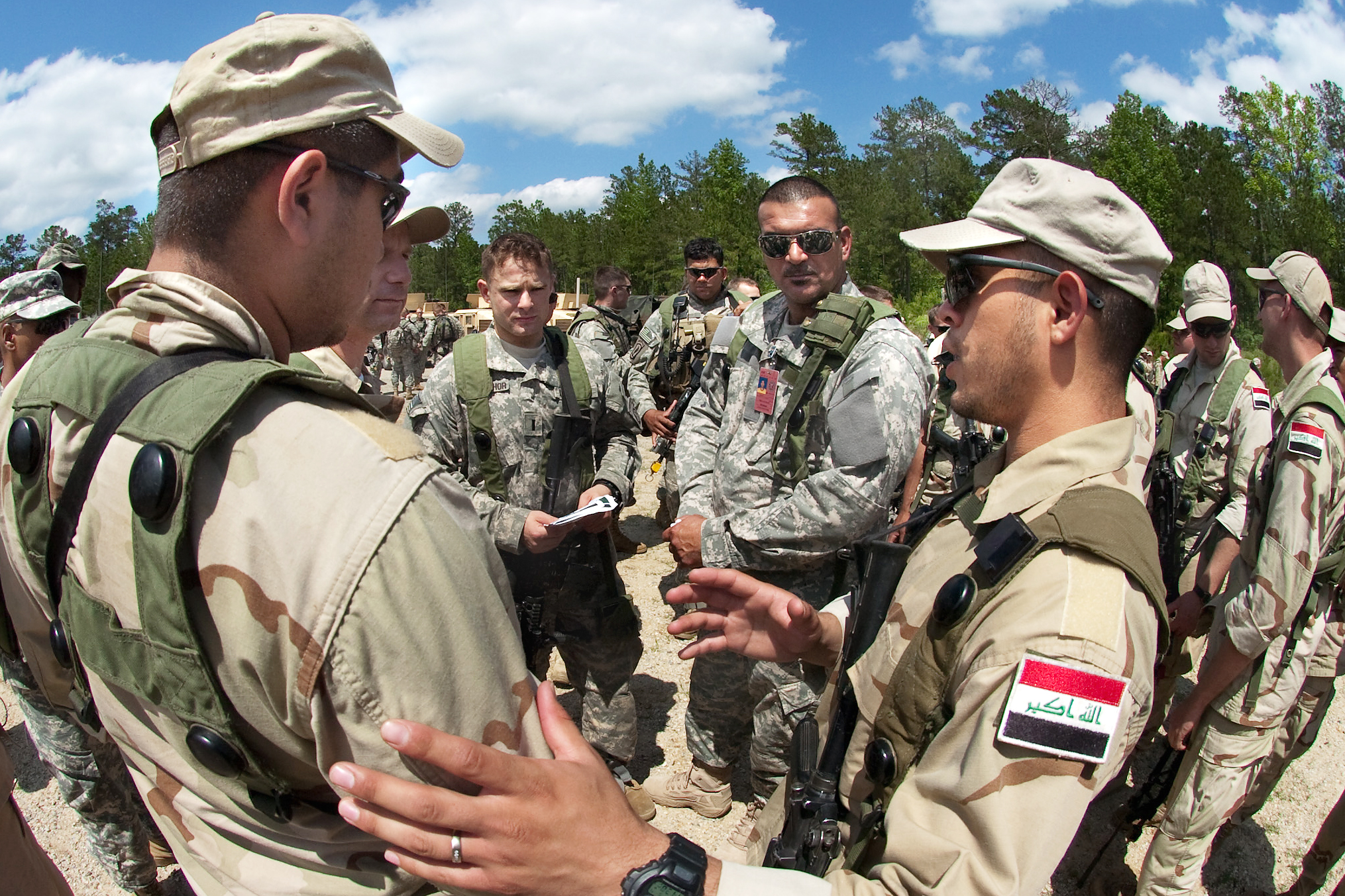
U.S. Army 1st Lt. Joshua Stuart-Shor, speaks with Iraqi army leaders through Iraq-born interpreter, Roger Algarawi, during a simulation training exercise emphasizing partnered security at the Joint Readiness Training Center on Fort Polk

An interpreter officer or army interpreter is a commissioned officer of an armed force, who interprets and/or translates to facilitate military operation. Interpreter officers are used extensively in multinational operations in which two or more countries that do not share a common language are undertaking a joint operation, or expeditionary missions in which the communication with the local population is crucial but limited by lack of language proficiency among the expeditionary force personnel. Interpreter officers also work in the intelligence gathering and analysis though in many countries, civilian analysts are used instead of the officers in active duty.

== Examples by country ==
=== United States ===
Interpreting services are provided by personnel from 223rd Military Intelligence Battalion (United States). The United States Military have used the Arabic linguists in the war in Iraq for example.

=== Republic of Korea ===
The Republic of Korea has a history of continuous presence of United States forces. Because the military personnel of both countries usually lack proficiency in each other's language, a corps of interpreter officers were trained to facilitate communication. Each service branch has its own group of interpreter officers. They participate in meetings, high level conferences or day-to-day informal discussions to offer simultaneous or consecutive translation, usually between English and Korean. During the military drills such as Key Resolve and Ulchi-Freedom Guardian, the demand for rapid translation of the communications among the forces of the combined command peaks and the interpreter officers play a crucial role in the seamless operations of the drills.

The majority of the interpreter officers work in English to Korean interpretation. Interpreter officers are also available for Chinese, Japanese, French and German though far fewer than those of English. Many but not all of the interpreter officers have spent many years abroad often in the English speaking countries. Serving as interpreter officer is a popular way for the Korean nationals studying in North America to do the mandatory military service because of the prestige and networking opportunity despite the length of the service which is slightly less than two years, at 21 months.

The camaraderie among the interpreter officer is relatively strong compare to the class of the officer candidate school because the group is small and culturally homogeneous. The interpreter officers as a group are western oriented, for the qualification exam requires considerable level of fluency in English and Korean as mandatory languages. Many interpreter officers pursue careers in the financial services or law after discharge.
