= Karamlesh =

Town in Nineveh, Iraq

Karamlesh ܟܪܡܠܫ
- Location within Iraq
- Coordinates: 36°18′13″N 43°24′46″E
- Country: Iraq
- Governorate: Nineveh
- District: Al-Hamdaniya District

Population (2018)
  - Total: 1,000+
- 3,000 prior to ISIS invasion
- Time zone: GMT +3

Karamlesh (Syriac: ܟܪܡܠܫ, Arabic: كرمليس; also spelled Karemlash, Karemles, Karemlish, etc.) is a town in northern Iraq located less than 18 miles (29 km) south east of Mosul.

It is surrounded by many hills that along with it made up the historical Assyrian city of Kar-Mullissi (written URU.kar-^{d}NIN.LÍL), which means "the city of Mullissu" in Akkadian. Its Assyrian residents fled to Kurdistan Region because of the planned escape from the Peshmerga following the invasion of the town by ISIS forces in August 2014. The town was liberated by Iraqi Security Forces from ISIS rule on October 24, 2016, as part of the larger Battle of Mosul.

== History ==
=== Patriarchal seat of the Church of the East ===
Karemlash was the seat of the Nestorian patriarch Denha II (1336/7–1381/2) for at least part of his reign. The continuator of the Ecclesiastical History of Bar Hebraeus mentions several contacts between Denha II and the Jacobite church in Karamlish between 1358 and 1364. At this period Karemlash had Jacobite and Armenian communities alongside its Nestorian majority, and its village chiefs styled themselves 'emirs'. The prosperity enjoyed by the village during the reign of Denha II presumably came to an end when the patriarchate was relocated to Mosul at an unknown date in the fourteenth or fifteenth century.

=== After Iraq War ===
Karemlash was relatively calm following the US-led Iraq War. In late 2003, the town came briefly under the control of the 101st Airborne Division (377th Parachute Field Artillery Battalion).

The town showed strong support towards the Assyrian Democratic Movement during the parliamentary and local elections in 2005, 2007 and 2010. The town also received thousands of Assyrian and other Christian refugees from other parts of the country after waves of violence against them. In response to the influx of refugees, Sarkis Aghajan and the Supreme Committee of Christian Affairs built and renovated new homes, churches, cemeteries, infrastructure and a complex for Armenian Refugees, among other improvements.

On August 6, 2014, the Islamic State of Iraq and Syria took over the town, causing all of its inhabitants to flee to Erbil. During their occupation of the city, they burned an 80-year-old Assyrian woman to death for "failing to comply with the strict laws of the Islamic State" and destroyed a large portion of the historic Mar Behnam Monastery.

On October 24, 2016, the city was liberated by the Iraqi Army, which on the same day, returned crosses to the domes of some of the main churches.

== Security ==
The Popular Mobilization Forces currently run the security in the Town.

== People ==
- Thabet Habib Yousif Al Mekko (1976–2025), Catholic bishop of Mosul.

== See also ==
- List of Assyrian settlements
- Assyrian homeland
- Assyrians in Iraq
- Proposals for Assyrian autonomy in Iraq
- Bartella
- Bakhdida
