= Chaldean Catholic Patriarchate of Baghdad =

Eastern Catholic patriarchate in Iraq

Chaldean Catholic Patriarchate of Baghdad Patriarchatus Chaldæorum

Catholic
- Coat of arms
- Incumbent; Paul III Nona since 12 April 2026

Location
- Country: Iraq
- Headquarters: Baghdad, Iraq

Information
- First holder: Saint Thomas the Apostle (as Patriarch of the Church of the East by tradition), Shimun VIII Yohannan Sulaqa (as Chaldean Catholic Patriarch)
- Denomination: Chaldean Catholic Church
- Rite: East Syriac Rite
- Established: Apostolic Era; 280 as Diocese of Seleucia-Ctesifonte; 1553 as Eastern Catholic Patriarchate
- Cathedral: Cathedral of St. Joseph
- Language: East-Syriac
- Bishops emeritus: Louis Raphaël I Sako

Website
- Official website

The Chaldean Catholic Patriarchate of Baghdad, or simply the Chaldean Patriarchate (Latin: Patriarchatus Chaldæorum), is the official title held by the primate of the Chaldean Catholic Church. The Patriarchate is based in the Cathedral of Our Lady of Sorrows, Baghdad, Iraq. The patriarchal see is currently held by Mar Paul III Nona. He is assisted by the archbishop of Erbil Shlemon Warduni and the Auxiliary Bishop of Baghdad, Basel Yaldo.

Chaldean Catholics are the majority of Assyrians in Iraq, an indigenous people of Upper Mesopotamia.

== Etymology ==
In 1552, there was a schism within the Church of the East. This was caused by discontent among the bishops (metropolitans) over actions of the patriarch Shemʿon VII Ishoʿyahb in following the tradition of previous patriarch Shemʿon IV Basidi who made the patriarchal succession hereditary, normally from uncle to nephew. Joseph I (1681–1696), who served as the Metropolitan of Amid (modern-day Diyarbakır, Turkey) led an off-shoot of the Church of the East and joined the Catholic Church. His successor, Joseph II (1696–1713), was officially bestowed with the symbolic title Patriarch of Babylon. Although this patriarchate was established in the city of Diyarbakır, it was eventually moved to the city of Mosul and finally to Baghdad where it remains to this day. The title Patriarch of Babylon or Patriarch of Babylon of the Chaldeans remained in popular usage until the name Babylon was officially abandoned in August, 2021.

== See also ==
- List of Chaldean Catholic patriarchs of Baghdad
- Chaldean Catholic Church
- Council of Catholic Patriarchs of the East

== Sources ==
- Wigram, William Ainger (1910). An Introduction to the History of the Assyrian Church or The Church of the Sassanid Persian Empire 100-640 A.D. London: Society for Promoting Christian Knowledge. ISBN 9780837080789.
- Wilmshurst, David (2000). The Ecclesiastical Organisation of the Church of the East, 1318–1913. Louvain: Peeters Publishers. ISBN 9789042908765.
- Wilmshurst, David (2011). The martyred Church: A History of the Church of the East. London: East & West Publishing Limited. ISBN 9781907318047.
