= Archbishop of Erbil =

The Archbishop of Erbil of the Chaldeans (or archepach) is the most senior member of the Catholic clergy in the Chaldean Catholic Archeparchy of Erbil. The current archbishop of Erbil is Bashar Matti Warda. He is well known for his wide-ranging support for the Christian refugees in Iraq, and for promoting inter-religious dialogue and environmental protection in Iraq.

Erbil is a Chaldean Rite see.

The archdiocese was split from the Chaldean Catholic Archeparchy of Kirkuk on the 7 March 1968. It revives an ancient diocese of the Assyrian Church of the East, which lapsed in the seventeenth century.

== List of archbishops and apostolic administrators ==
- Archbishop Bashar Matte Warda, C.SS.R. (24 May 2010 – ...)
- Bishop Rabban al-Qas(apostolic administrator) (2007 – 24 May 2010)
- Archbishop Yacoub Denha Scher(12 January 2001 – 8 January 2005)
- Archbishop Jacques Ishaq (7 May 1997 – 4 May 1999)
- Archbishop Hanna Markho (5 August 1994 – 23 October 1996)
- Archbishop Stéphane Babaca (28 October 1969 – 5 August 1994)

== See also ==
- Catholic Church in Iraq
- Catholic University in Erbil
