= Yousef VI Emmanuel II Thomas =

Head of the Chaldean Catholic Church from 1900 to 1947

- Patriarch of Babylon of the Chaldeans
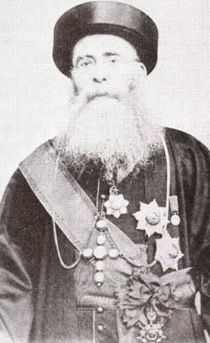
- Church: Chaldean Catholic Church
- See: Babylon of the Chaldeans
- Installed: July 9, 1900
- Term ended: July 21, 1947
- Predecessor: Audishu V Khayyath
- Successor: Yousef VII Ghanima

Orders
- Ordination: July 10, 1879 (Priest)
- Consecration: July 24, 1892 (Bishop) by Eliya Abulyonan

Personal details
- Born: Yousef Emmanuel Thomas; August 8, 1852 Alqosh
- Died: July 21, 1947 (aged 94)
- Residence: Iraq

Mar Yousef VI Emmanuel II Thomas (August 8, 1852 - July 21, 1947) was the patriarch of the Chaldean Catholic Church from 1900 until his death in 1947.

== Life ==
He was born on August 8, 1852, in Alqosh. An ethnic Assyrian, he studied in the Ghazir Seminary in Lebanon and was ordained priest on July 10, 1879. On July 24, 1892, he was ordained Bishop of Seert, now in Turkey, by patriarch Eliya XIV [XIII] Abulyonan. He was appointed Patriarch of the Chaldean Church on the July 9, 1900, and confirmed by the Holy See on December 17 of the same year. He presided over the Chaldean Catholic Church during World War I and World War II, including the Assyrian genocide, serving as patriarch until his death on July 21, 1947. He succeeded Patriarch Audishu V Khayyath and was succeeded by Yousef VII Ghanima.

Catholic Church titles
Preceded by Audishu V Khayyath (1894–1899)	Patriarch of Babylon of the Chaldean Catholic Church; 1900–1946	Succeeded by Yousef VII Ghanima (1946–1958)
