= Acts of Mar Mari =

Syriac Christian apochrypha

The Acts of Mar Mari [ܦܪܲܟܣܝ̣ܣ ܕܡܳܪܝ ܡܳܐܪܝ̣] is a Syriac Christian apocryphal acts. It pertains to the introduction of Christianity in northern and southern Mesopotamia by Addai's disciple Saint Mari in the first century and in the beginning of the second century AD.

== Manuscript history ==
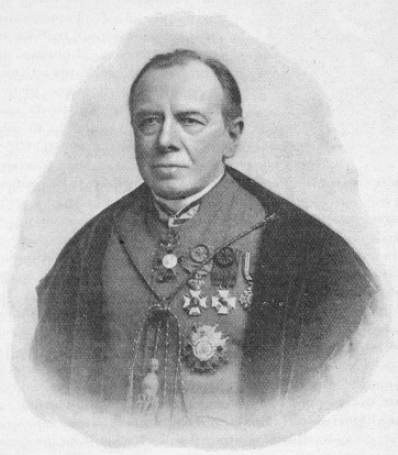
Photograph of Jean Baptiste Abbeloos in L'Université de Louvain. Coup d'oeil sur son histoire et ses institutions, 1425–1900, Bruxelles, Bulens, 1900, p. 91.

The Acts of Mar Mari is preserved in multiple manuscripts. Six manuscripts written in either Syriac or Garshuni dated from the nineteenth century and are stored at the Library of the Rabban Hormizd Monastery. These manuscripts were copied at either Tel Keppe or Alqosh from a series called Stories of Saints and Martyrs. One manuscript was known to be copied at Alqosh in 1881 by a man named Abraham of the Qāshā (Priest) family. His copy was based on a nineteenth-century manuscript written by master copyist Īsā Aqrūrāiā. Jean Baptiste Abbeloos had compared the manuscript with an older one he had received from Bishop G. Khyyath of Amida. Abbeloos published it along with his Latin translation in his Acta Sancta Maris (1885) with a list of variants between the manuscripts.

R. Raabe had compared a manuscript known as CB hereafter with Abbeloos's. He had published his German translation along with variants in his Die Geschichte des Dominus Mari, eines Apostels des Orients (Leipzig: Hinrichs, 1893).

Paul Bedjan edited his manuscript based on Abbeloos in his Acta Martyrum et Sanctorum Syriace (1890). Bedjan's manuscript was less descriptive than Abbeloos and Raabes.

There are also two Arabic translations of the Acts of Mar Mari. The first was from Bishop Addai Scher of Seert (Turkey) in his Kitāb sītar ašher šuhadā al-mašriq al-qiddīsīn (1900). The other was an abridged translation with sections of the beginning and the end being omitted. It was published by Fr. Albert Abūjā in his Šuhadā al-mašriq (1985).

The Acts of Mar Mari was translated for the first time from Syriac to English in Amir Harrak's The Acts of Mār Mārī the Apostle (2005).

== Textual similarities ==
The Acts of Mar Mari derives from the Doctrine of Addai, but includes some insertions from the Bible (primarily the Book of Daniel), Eusebius and ancient literary content from Mesopotamia. The author of the Acts of Mar Mari claims to have written down traditions transmitted from books but never identifies them. According to Amir Harrak, the author probably inserted fragmented information from old sources, but incorporated them in the Acts in way that has made the incorporations indistinguishable from the author's edition of the Acts.

The introduction of the Acts begins with a correspondence between Abgar V and Jesus and Abgar's healing by Addai from the Doctrine of Addai. The Acts further usage of the Doctrine of Addai continues with a similar occurrence concerning the healing of the king who ruled over Arzen; The Arzen king was suffering from the exact disease gout as Abgar did, but the Arzen king is healed by Mar Mari as Abgar was healed by Addai. The king then conversed with Mar Mari as King Abgar did similarly with Addai in the Doctrine of Addai. Not much prior to his death, Mar Mari addresses his disciples with the exact words as Addai did when he was on his sickbed.

A similar motif from a Syriac translation of Eusebius's Church History (7:17) can be found in the Acts of Mar Mari (Ch.1) which depicts a copper statue of a woman that had been bleeding for twelve years; The statue is in reference to a woman whom had been bleeding for twelve years in the Gospel of Mark (5:25–34). The statue's position has been described to be on a rock with the arms stretch out and knees bent and facing the opposite side of the house of the actual women referenced in Mark, and next to the statue, a copper statue of Jesus clothed with a cloak and having the arms stretched out towards the women statue.

Many moments in the Act of Mar Mari were inspired by the Bible. In the Book of Daniel (Ch.3), Nebuchadnezzar II made threats to have Shadrach, Meshach, and Abednego thrown into a blazing furnace if they refused to worship a golden statue he had set up. A similar threat was made (Mar Mari Ch.12) to those who would violate a three-day prohibition of the use of fire during a ceremonial worship of gods. A three-day motif is also alluded to Darius the Mede instituting a decree to have everyone pay homage only to him in a thirty-day period (Dan 6:7, 12). Shadrach, Meshach, and Abednego were eventually thrown into the blazing furnace, but by divine intervention because of their faith in God, they were miraculously unharmed by the fire (Dan 3:19–23). This event is mirrored in the Acts (Ch.23) when Mar Mari enters the fire but is unharmed.

== Date ==
The date of the Acts of Mar Mari is not universally accepted. Jean Baptiste Abbeloos who first edited the text, dated the Acts to the sixth or possibly during the seventh century AD. Josef Markwart chose a late date because of the two geographical places mentioned, Gawar and Zawzan which are unattested in the early periods. Harrak states that these names do not sound Arabic, and though Zawzan is found occurring only in Arabic sources, Harrak states it does not mean the name was coined in the Arab period. He further explains the majority of geographical places mentioned in the Acts are evidently present in Syriac sources of the pre-Islamic era. Several scholars have dated the Acts to the mid seventh century after the fall of the Sasanian Empire by the Arabs, however, Amir Harrak states that's unlikely since the Acts never mentions the end of the Sasanian Empire or near it. Harrak suggests the Acts could have been composed during the fifth or sixth century AD, with the latter date being more likely, as it was a period of prosperity for the Church of the East in southern Mesopotamia.

== Bibliography ==
- Grubbs, Judith Evans; Parkin, Tim; Bell, Roslynne (2013). The Oxford Handbook of Childhood and Education in the Classical World. Oxford University Press. ISBN 9780199781607.
- Harrak, Amir (2005). The Acts of Mār Mārī the Apostle. Society of Biblical Lit. ISBN 9781589830936.
