= Emmanuel III Delly =

Head of the Chaldean Catholic Church from 2003 to 2012

His Eminent Beatitude: Emmanuel III Delly; ܡܪܝ ܥܡܢܘܐܝܠ ܬܠܝܬܝܐ ܕܠܝ; مار عمانوئيل الثالث دلّي
- Cardinal Patriarch of Babylon of the Chaldeans
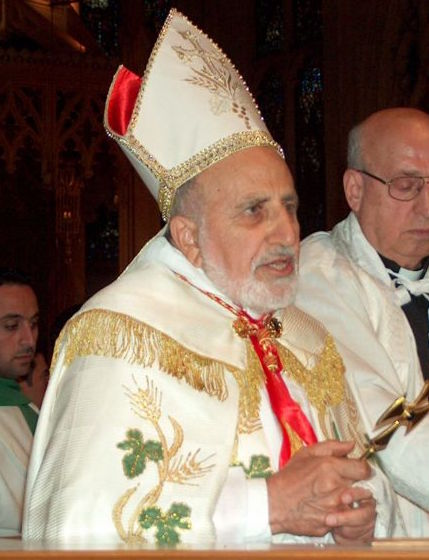
- Native name: ܡܪܝ ܥܡܢܘܐܝܠ ܬܠܝܬܝܐ ܕܠܝ
- Church: Chaldean Catholic Church
- Archdiocese: Babylon
- See: Babylon
- Appointed: 3 December 2003
- Term ended: 19 December 2012
- Predecessor: Raphael I Bidawid
- Successor: Louis Raphaël I Sako
- Previous posts: Auxiliary Bishop of Babylon (1962–1997); Titular Bishop of Palaeopolis in Asia (1962–1967); Titular Archbishop of Kaskar dei Caldie (1967–2003); Curial Bishop of Babylon (1997–2002); Chaldean Archbishop of Baghdad (2003–2012)

Orders
- Ordination: 21 December 1952
- Consecration: 16 April 1963 by Paul II Cheikho
- Created cardinal: 24 November 2007 by Pope Benedict XVI
- Rank: Cardinal-Bishop

Personal details
- Born: Emmanuel Karim Delly; 27 September 1927 Tel Keppe, Iraq
- Died: 8 April 2014 (aged 86) San Diego, California, U.S.
- Denomination: Chaldean Catholic
- Residence: Iraq

Mar Emmanuel III Delly (Syriac: ܡܪܝ ܥܡܢܘܐܝܠ ܬܠܝܬܝܐ ܕܠܝ, Arabic: مار عمانوئيل الثالث دلّي; born Karem Delly; 27 September 1927 – 8 April 2014) was an Iraqi Catholic prelate who served as Patriarch of Baghdad and primate of the Chaldean Catholic Church, an Eastern Catholic sui juris particular church of the Catholic Church.

He was born in Tel Keppe and was ordained a priest on 21 December 1952. He was consecrated a bishop in December 1962 at the age of 35. He was elected Patriarch of the Chaldean Church on 3 December 2003, succeeding the late Patriarch Raphael I Bidawid. He was made a cardinal on 24 November 2007.

== Birth ==
Karem Delly was born in Tel Keppe, in northern Iraq, on 27 September 1927 to Jarjes Murad Delly and Katrina Putros. He was baptized on 6 October 1927 by Father Francis Kattola.

== Episcopal life ==
Since his election as Patriarch in December 2003, Mar Emmanuel III Delly continued to work for the Chaldean Church. In Iraq, the Chaldean Church, which is the largest Christian group, consists of eight dioceses totaling 100 parishes and approximately 1,000,000 people. Additionally, there are another eight dioceses outside of Iraq, in countries including Iran, Turkey, Syria, Lebanon, Egypt, Europe, Australia, Canada and the U.S. It is estimated that the Chaldean population is over one and a half million devotees worldwide. He was well known for his respect and cooperation with leaders of other churches and faiths, mainly Muslims.

During his 42 years as a bishop, Delly's contributions to the Chaldean Church include building of many churches in and outside of Iraq. He supervised the Chaldean monasteries and convents, as well as several Chaldean religious journals and publications.

On 17 October 2007, Pope Benedict XVI announced that he would make Delly a Cardinal. Delly was elevated to the College of Cardinals in the consistory at St. Peter's Basilica on November 24, 2007. Pope Benedict XVI said that by naming Delly a cardinal he was demonstrating his "spiritual closeness and [his] affection" for Iraqi Christians. He was the first Chaldean Patriarch to be created a cardinal.

On 19 December 2012, Delly resigned as patriarch of Chaldean Catholic Church and Pope Benedict named Archeparch Jacques Ishaq as administrator ad interim. At the same time Pope Benedict convoked a synod to be held to Rome of the Chaledean Church to choose Delly's successor as patriarch.

Delly did not participate in the 2013 conclave, having already reached age 80 at the time he had been created cardinal.

== Death ==
Delly died on 8 April 2014, aged 86, in San Diego, California, where he had lived in retirement. Pope Francis offered his condolences.

Delly's funeral was held at St. Peter's Chaldean Catholic Cathedral in San Diego and at Mother of God Cathedral in Detroit. He is buried in Holy Sepulchre Catholic Cemetery in Detroit. This is the first time a Chaldean patriarch has been buried outside the homeland.

== Educational degrees ==
- Master's Degree in Philosophy, Pontifical Urbaniana University.
- Pontifical Urbaniana University—Faculty of Philosophy—Program of Studies (accessed 13 November 2007)
- Doctor of Sacred Theology, Pontifical Lateran University.
- Doctor of Canon Law, Pontifical Lateran University.

== Languages ==
Mar Emmanuel III Delly spoke Chaldean Neo-Aramaic, Syriac, Arabic, French, Italian, Latin, and English fluently.

Ordination history of Emmanuel III Delly
History
Priestly ordination
- Date: 21 December 1952
Episcopal consecration
- Principal consecrator: Paul II Cheikho
- Co-consecrators: Raphaël I Bidawid, Armand-Etienne M. Blanquet du Chayla, O.C.D.
- Date: 19 April 1963
Cardinalate
- Elevated by: Pope Benedict XVI
- Date: 24 November 2007
Episcopal succession
Bishops consecrated by Emmanuel III Delly as principal consecrator
- Emil Shimoun Nona: 8 January 2010
- Bashar Matti Warda, C.SS.R.: 3 July 2010

Catholic Church titles
Preceded by Raphael I Bidawid	Patriarch of Babylon of the Chaldean Catholic Church; 2003–2012	Succeeded by Louis Raphaël I Sako
