= Rabban Al-Qas =

Iraqi Chaldean Catholic bishop (1949–2023)

- Bishop of the Eparchy of Amadiya
- See: Patriarchate of Baghdad
- In office: 1 February 2002 – 11 July 2013; 27 June 2020 – 14 August 2021
- Predecessor: Hanna Kello
- Successor: Azad Sabri Shaba
- Previous post: Bishop of Zakho (2013–2020)

Orders
- Ordination: 6 May 1973
- Consecration: 1 February 2002 by Raphael I Bidawid

Personal details
- Born: 1 July 1949 Komane, Iraq
- Died: 28 August 2023 (aged 74)

Rabban Al-Qas (1 July 1949 – 28 August 2023) was an Iraqi Chaldean Catholic heirarch. He served as Bishop of Amadiya from 2001 to 2021. He also served as Bishop of Zakho from 2013 until 2020 when the Eparchy of Amadiya was split from the Eparchy of Zakho.

== Biography ==
On 6 December 2001, Al-Qas became Bishop of Amadiyah. The Chaldean Catholic Patriarch of Babylon, Raphael I Bidawid, consecrated him as a bishop on 1 February 2002; Al-Qas was also co-consecrated by the Chaldean Archbishop of Kirkuk, André Sana, and the Chaldean Bishop of Alquosh, Abdul-Ahad Sana. From 2007 to 2010, he was also the administrator of the Archeparchy of Erbil.

Al-Qas became bishop of the combined Diocese of Zaku and Amadiyah on 11 July 2013. On 27 June 2020, the Chaldean Patriarch Louis Raphaël I Sako abolished the unification of the dioceses and reestablished the Diocese of Amadiyah as an independent diocese and al-Qas was reappointed to that position. He resigned on 14 August 2021 and on 24 December, Al-Qas was replaced by Azad Sabri Shaba.

Rabban Al-Qas died on 28 August 2023, at the age of 74.
