= Jacques Ishaq =

Chaldean archbishop (1938–2023)

- Titular Archbishop of Nisibis dei Caldei
- Church: Chaldean Catholic Church
- See: Curial Bishop of the Patriarchate of Babylon
- In office: 2005–2015
- Previous post: Archbishop of Erbil (1997–1999)

Orders
- Ordination: 20 June 1963
- Consecration: 26 September 1997 by Raphael I Bidawid

Personal details
- Born: 25 February 1938 Mosul, Kingdom of Iraq
- Died: 22 June 2023 (aged 85) Erbil, Iraq

Archbishop Mar Jacques Ishaq (Arabic: جاك اسحق; 25 February 1938 – 22 June 2023) was an Iraqi Chaldean Catholic hierarch who served as Curial Bishop of the Patriarchate of Babylon. He served as locum tenens of the Patriarch of Babylon of the Chaldeans between the retirement of Emmanuel III Delly in December 2012 and the election of Louis Raphaël I Sako in January 2013.

== Biography ==
Jacques Ishaq was born at Mosul, Kingdom of Iraq on 25 February 1938, but in family that hailed from Alqosh. He was ordained priest on 20 June 1963. On 7 May 1997, he was appointed Archbishop of Erbil; he was consecrated bishop on 26 September 1997, by Patriarch Mar Raphael I Bidawid, Archbishop André Sana, and Bishop Emmanuel Delly. He retired on 4 May 1999.

On 21 December 2005, he was appointed Titular Archbishop of Nisibis dei Caldei and Curial Bishop of the Patriarchate of Babylon.

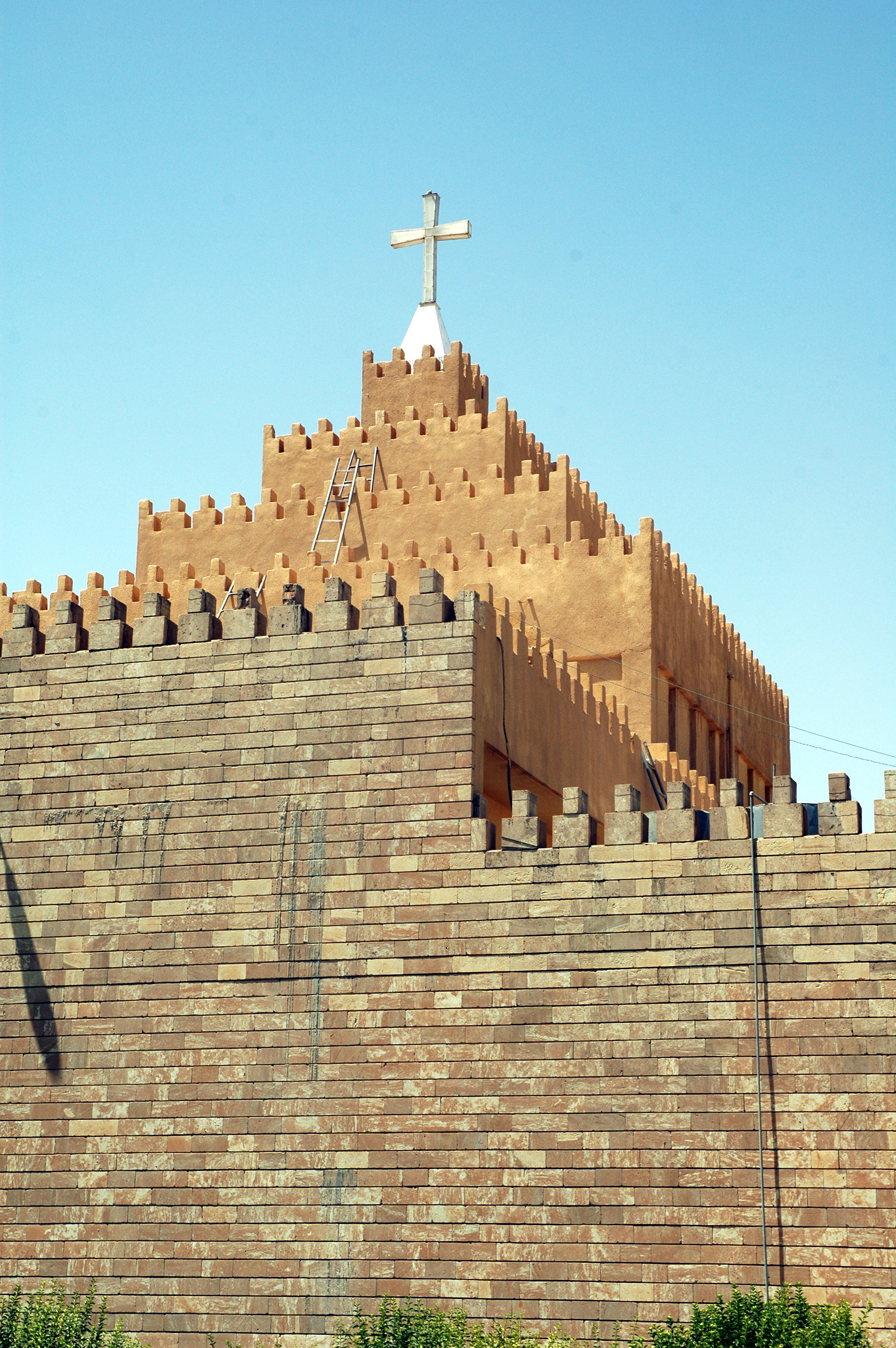
Cathedral of Saint Joseph, Ankawa.

Upon the retirement of Patriarch Mar Emmanuel III Delly, he served as locum tenens of the Patriarchate of Babylon of the Chaldeans until the election of Patriarch Louis Raphaël I Sako. In 2014 he retired as Curial Bishop of Babylon.

Ishaq died on 22 June 2023, at the age of 85.

Catholic Church titles
Preceded by Hanna Markho	Chaldean Catholic Archbishop of Erbil; 1997–1999	Succeeded by Yacoub Denha Scher
Vacant Title last held by Gabriel Koda	— TITULAR — Archbishop of Nisibis of the Chaldeans; 2005–2023	Succeeded by George Koovakad
