= Mar Qardakh school =

Christian school for ages 3-16 in Erbil, Iraq

Mar Qardakh International School is an International Baccalaureate accredited school in Ankawa, Iraq, a suburb of Erbil in Kurdistan. The school offers an Early Years Program (EY), Primary Years Program (PYP), Middle Years Program (MYP), and High school (separately accredited through the Accreditation Service for International Schools, Colleges, and Universities [ASIC]).
