= Ankawa =

Town in Kurdistan Region, Iraq

- Suburb
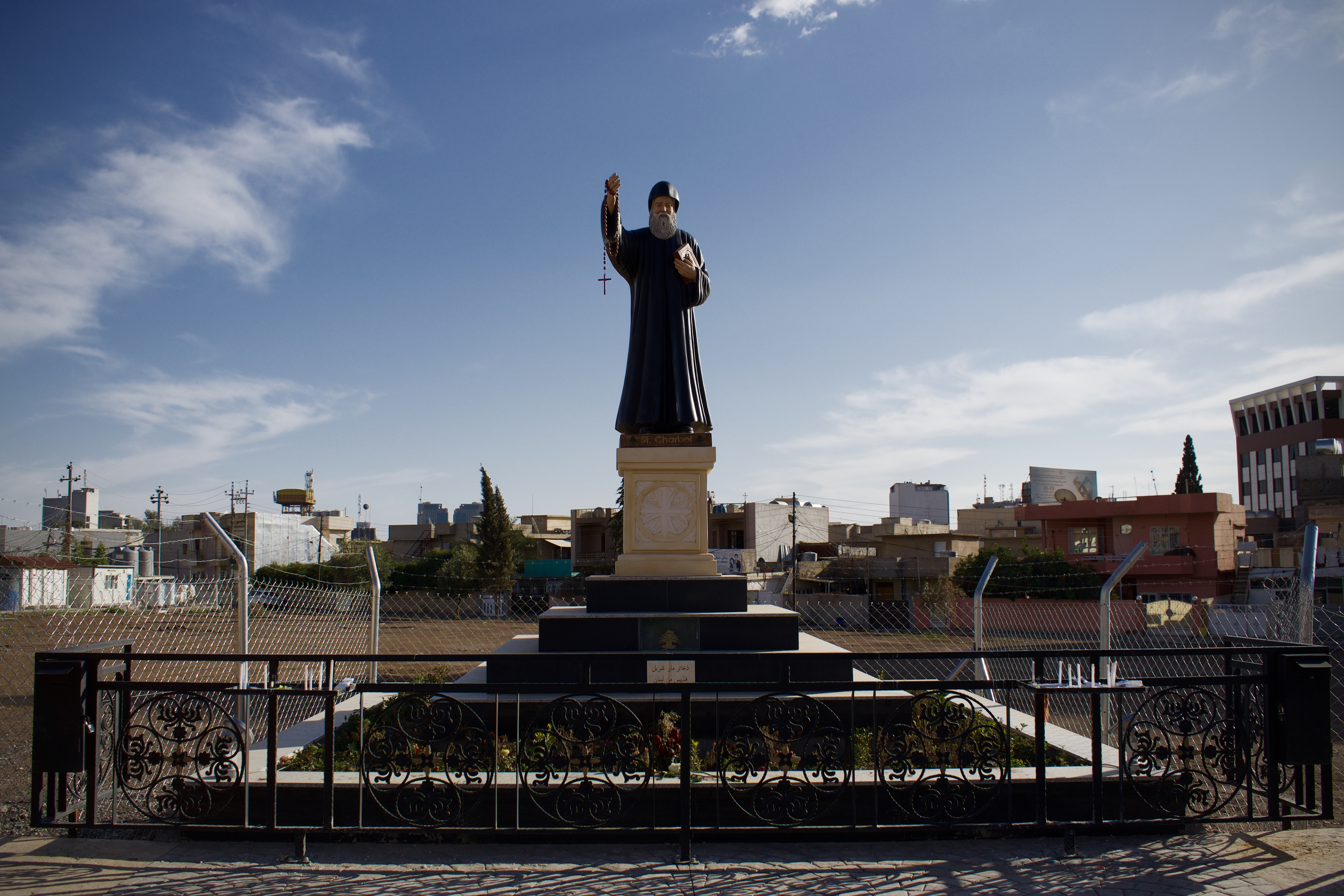
- Views around the entrance to Ankawa at Ankawa Road and Hundred Meter Road.

- Location within Iraqi Kurdistan Location within Iraq
- Coordinates: 36°13′45″N 43°59′37″E
- Country: Iraq
- Region: Kurdistan Region
- Province: Erbil Governorate
- Municipality: Ankawa

Population (2024 census)
  - Total: 40,708
- Postal code: 44003
- Website: https://english.ankawa.com/

Ankawa (Arabic: عنكاوا, romanized: Ankāwā; Kurdish: عەنکاوە, romanized: Enkawe, Syriac: ܥܲܢܟܵܒ̣ܵܐ) is a suburb and neighborhood of Erbil in Kurdistan Region, Iraq. It is located 8 kilometres (5 mi) northwest of downtown Erbil. The suburb is predominantly populated by Christian Assyrians, most of whom adhere to the Chaldean Catholic Church.

== History ==
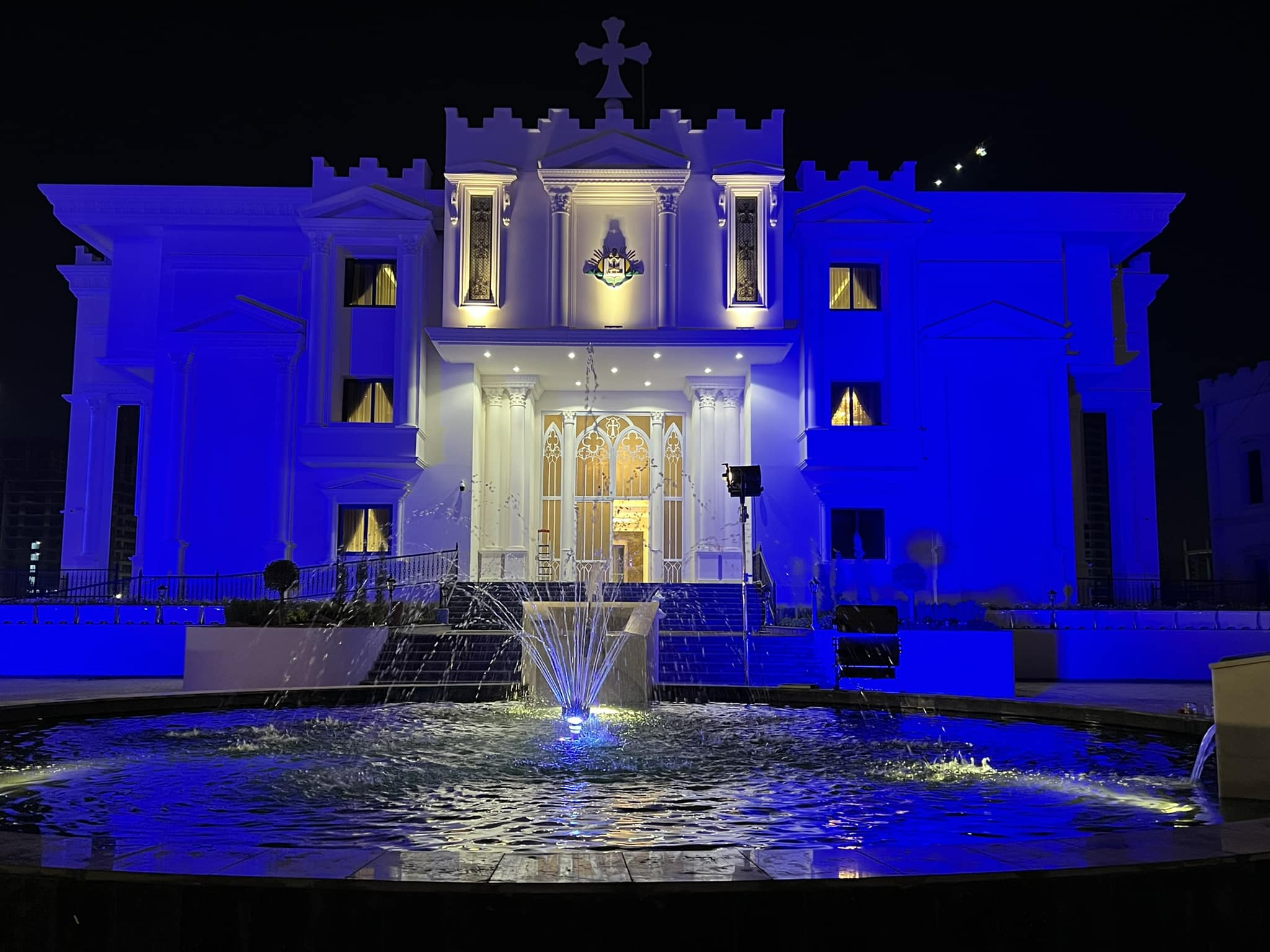
The patriarchate of the Assyrian Church of the East

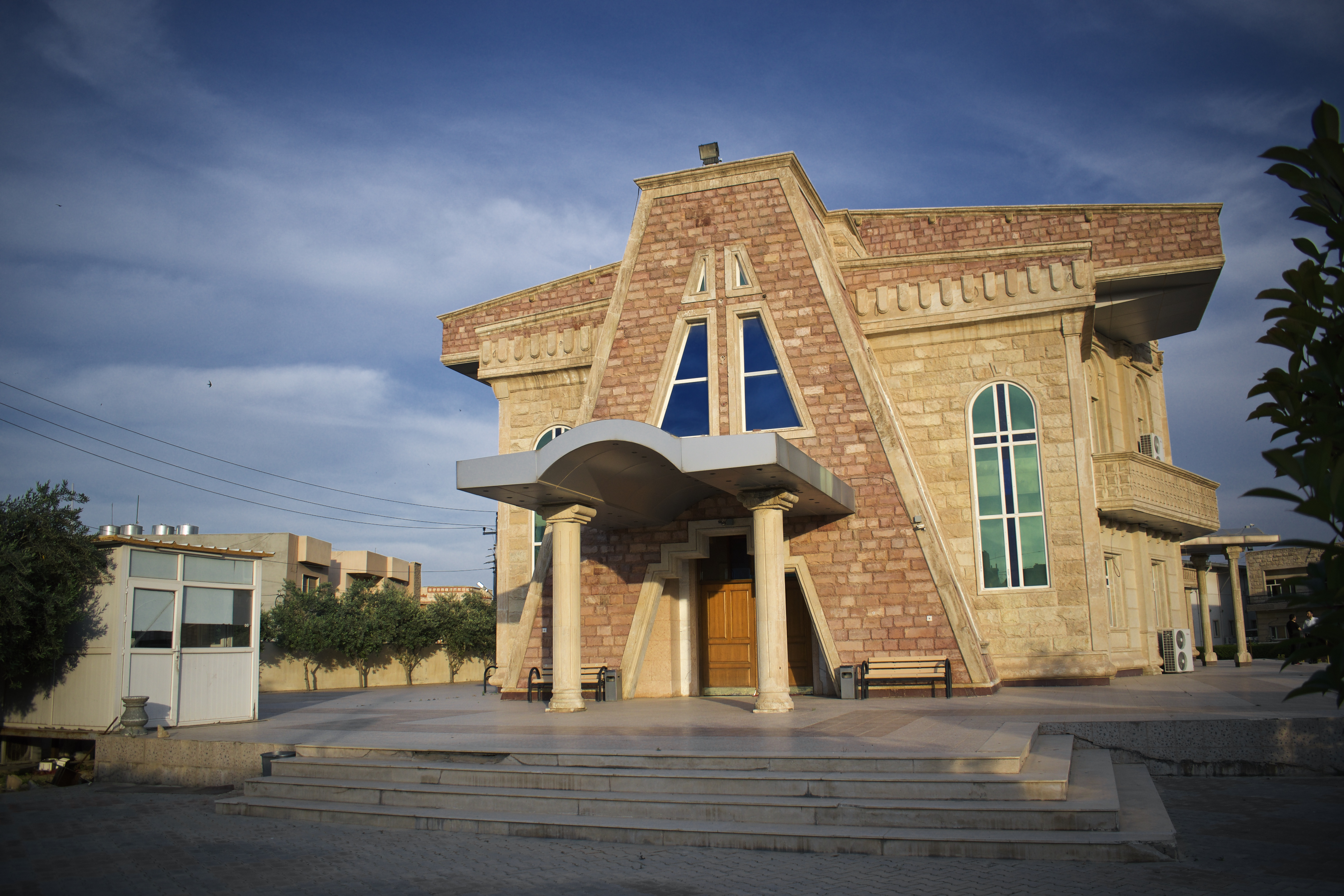
Cathedral of Saint John the Baptist in Ankawa: The former Patriarchal see of the Assyrian Church of the East

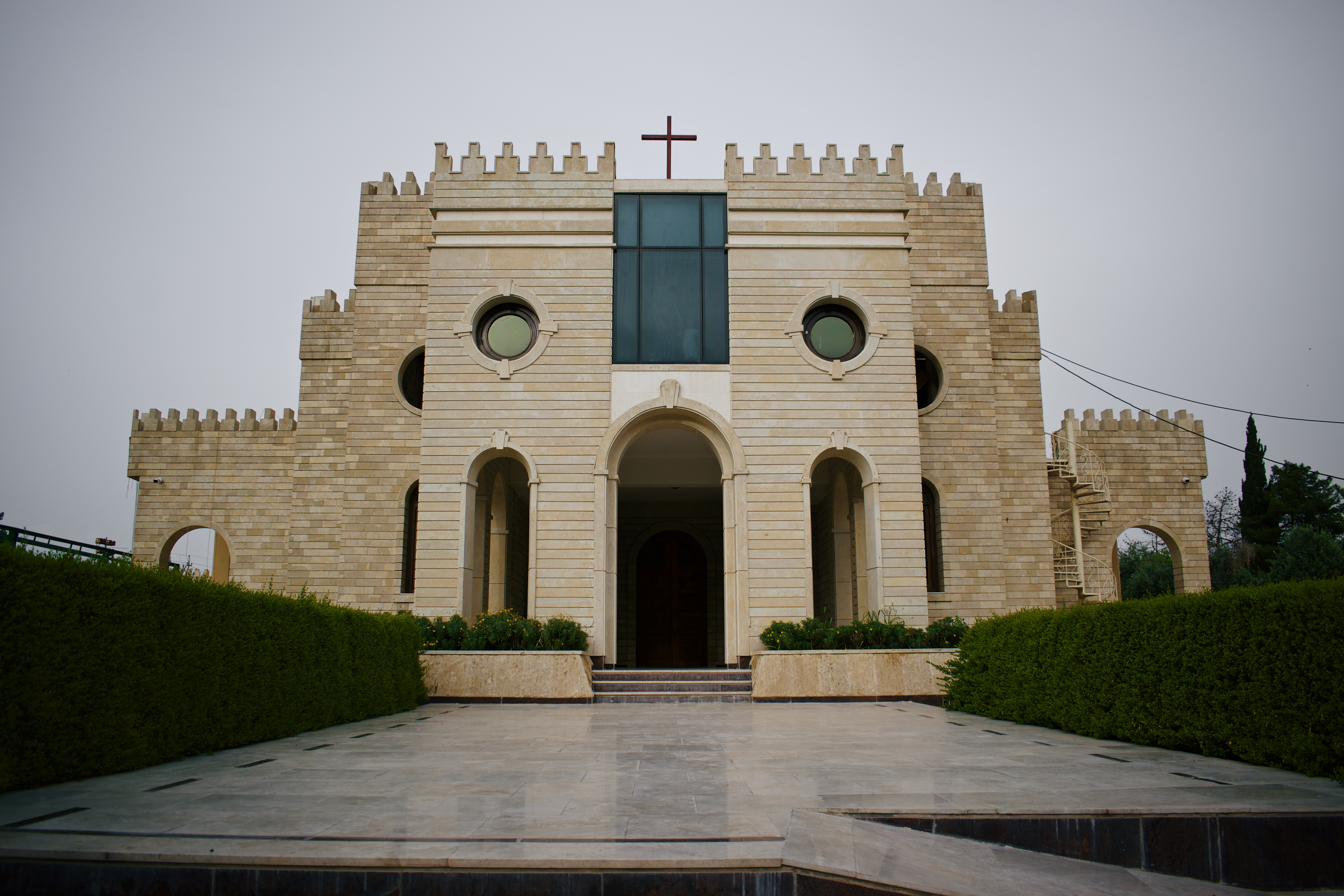
Chaldean Catholic Church of Saint Joseph in Ankawa

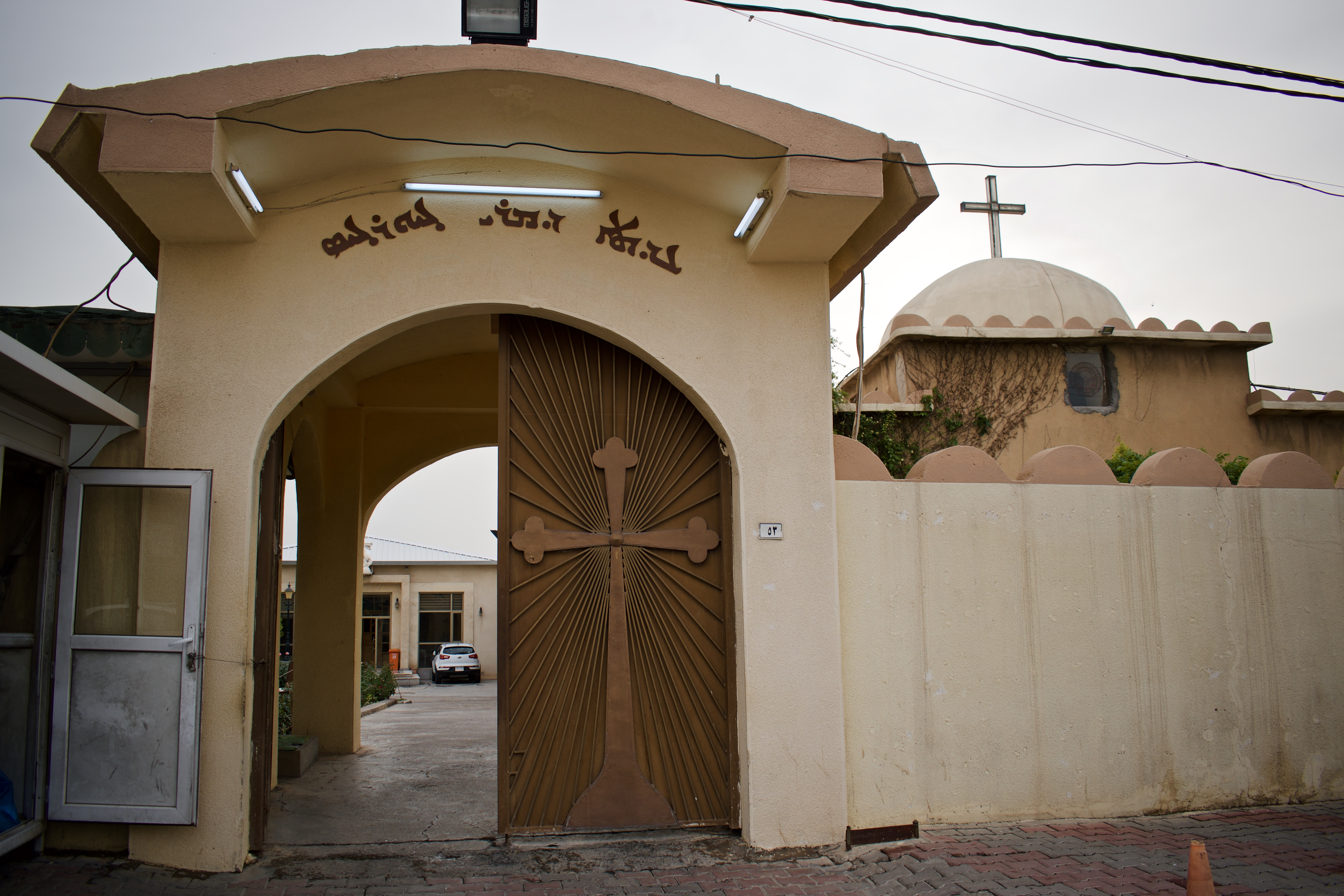
St. George's Church, Ankawa

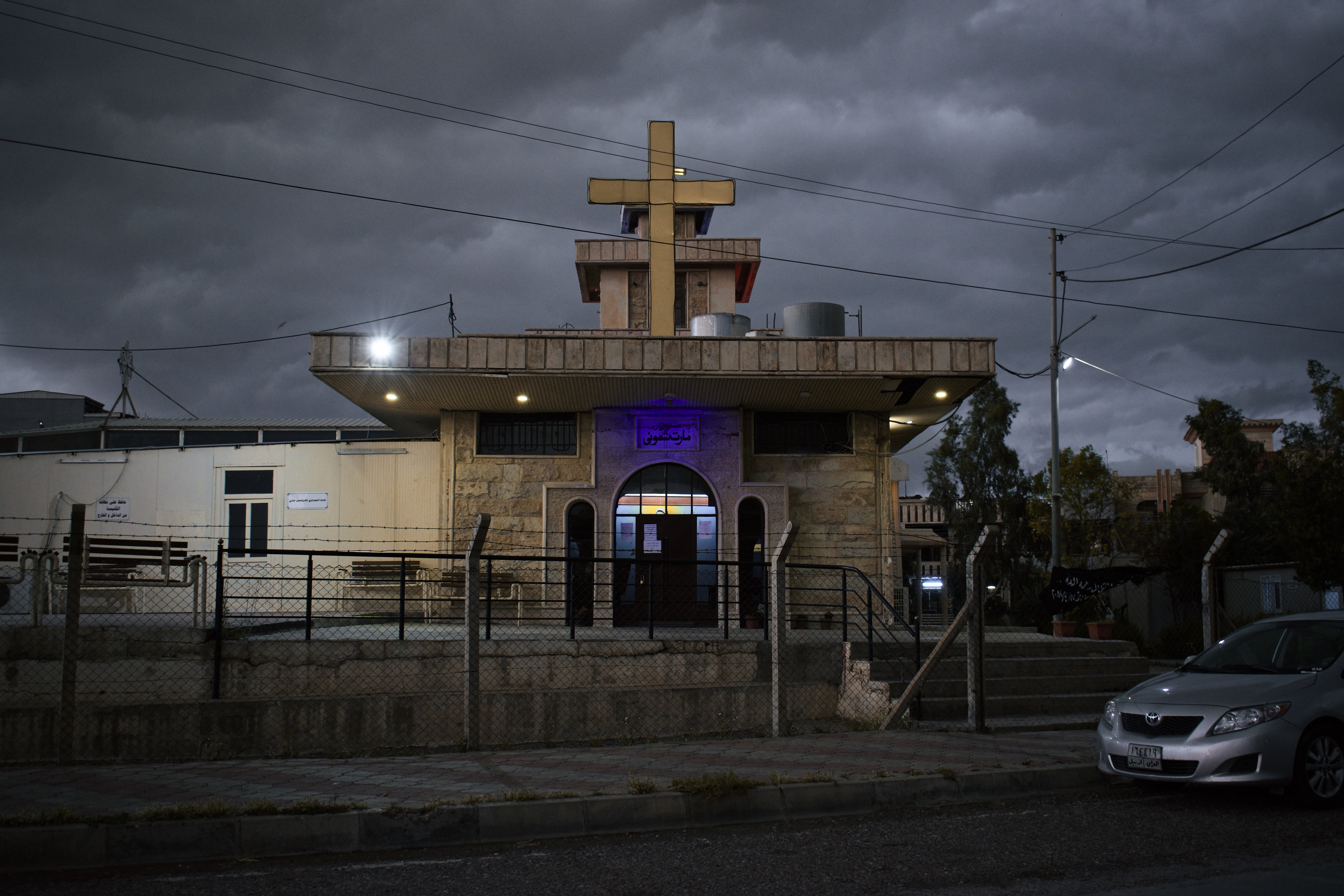
The Syriac Catholic Church of Mart Shmony in Ankawa

Finnish Assyriologist Simo Parpola has suggested that Ankawa corresponds to the Neo-Assyrian town of Milqia near Arbela, where the Akitu-house of the goddess Ishtar was located. Milqia is often identified with Melqi, a town mentioned in the East Syriac hagiography "History of Mar Qardagh". In this text Melqi is the martyrdom site and burial place of the legendary Assyrian Saint Mar Qardagh, a Sasanian noble and warrior who converted from Zoroastrianism to Christianity. The hagiography describes Mar Qardagh as being "from a great people from the stock of the kingdom of the Assyrians." Mar Qardagh is highly venerated in Ankawa and his story has remained popular among the local christian population.

Ankawa was originally called Beth Amka, which later morphed to Amku-Bad, Ankava, and finally Ankawa. The name of the town is mentioned in Bar Hebraeus's book entitled "A Brief History of the Countries," where he states: "Mongol troops attacked the area of Erbil on Sunday July 1285 and reached some villages ... including Ankawa." The shrine of Mary, also known as Mariamana, was built after the ancient Roman designs. Tell Qasra, or Qasra Knoll, is an ancient archaeological site, a 6-meter high mound that was used as a palace in the center of Ankawa. The hill dates back to the Neo-Assyrian period. The city was formerly known as Arbela, which was the capital city of Adiabene and the seat of Inanna.

Ankawa has many archaeological sites, including "The Hill," which was recorded as an archaeological site in Iraq in 1945. It is also home to Cathedral of Saint Joseph (Umra d'Mar Yosip), the seat of the Chaldean Catholic Archeparchy of Arbil. Ankawa used to be a small village located northwest of Erbil, but has grown into a city in its own right. The city has recently become a principal settlement for Christians in Iraq. One of the main reasons for the town's population rise is due to the ISIS takeover of the Nineveh Plains in 2014 after KRG security forces forcibly disarmed local populations in the Nineveh Plains, asserting a full monopoly of arms and control over security, while pledging to protect all, and then preemptively retreated from their posts as ISIS approached, abandoning the local populations and exposing them to genocide, all without informing locals that they were withdrawing at the last minute and without firing a single bullet. This caused a fair amount of those who fled to come to Ankawa and other areas in Kurdistan Region. The Assyrian Church of the East, which after several decades of being located in the United States, has decided to move their Patriarchal see to Ankawa.

== Allegations of tax discrimination ==
The Assyrian Policy Institute (API) has accused the Kurdistan Regional Government (KRG) of business and tax discrimination against the Assyrian residents of Ankawa on numerous occasions. One 2018 API report claimed that the KRG required all business owners from the city to renew their business licenses with the Erbil Center District for a fee. The alleged regulation applied exclusively to Ankawa, despite the fact that nine other districts were under the Erbil Center District's jurisdiction. There were also allegations that the renewal process was deliberately lengthy and expensive, and that KRG officials expected bribes in exchange for processing the renewals. Many Assyrians viewed this as an attempt by the KRG to hurt their businesses and secure a monopoly on industries in their areas of control.

The KRG released an official statement in which they denied these allegations and referred to them as “baseless.”

The API responded to the KRG's denial of these claims in a later report. The API claimed that this latest denial of human rights abuses by the KRG is consistent with previous denials of accusations of wrongdoing. Examples of this that the API provided was the KRG's denial of accusations made by Human Rights Watch, Amnesty International, and the US Department of State Human Rights Report. The report goes on to say that the reason that the API had originally made the claim about the KRG tax policy was due to an Ankawa-based activist group called Hand in Hand approaching them and explaining the situation to them. The report also provided documentation of the ordinance in question that proved that a new tax policy specifically in Ankawa had been created by the KRG.

The report then says that Assyrian business owners affected by the new tax policy as well as Assyrian parliamentarians in the Iraqi Parliament and the Kurdistan Region Parliament who corroborated these claims. Some business owners attempted to legally appeal the policy, but the government upheld its decision.

Furthermore, the report claimed that the Assyrian parliamentarians who were interviewed about the new tax policy claimed that they had inquired to the KRG Shura Council about the policy, and received a response saying:

"Not collecting this tax in some towns as a result of negligence or incompetence of the relevant KRG departments is no reason to refrain from collecting such a tax in said towns [Ankawa]."

The API stated that this was essentially a public admission by the KRG that the tax collection policy was arbitrary.

The report concluded that the tax rate was imposed on the city of Ankawa as an act of business discrimination against one of the only Assyrian-majority areas in KRG jurisdiction. They encouraged the KRG to formally accept their role in this policy, and claimed that they, “[stand] ready to meet with KRG officials both in Iraq and in the United States to address the many long-standing grievances of Ankawa residents, including the improper confiscation of lands belonging to Assyrians and KRG policies advancing demographic change in the area, as well as interference in local, regional, and federal elections for Assyrian representatives.”

== Today ==
Within the last decade, Ankawa has developed rapidly educationally and technologically. Today, many tourists visit Ankawa from the capital Baghdad, and other cities across Iraq. The suburb has been through a long construction period, and there are international schools as well as restaurants available today inside. After the fall of Mosul to ISIL militants, many Christians who had been displaced came to Ankawa and have been provided with personal needs by the church and international organizations.

== See also ==
- Catholic University in Erbil
- Assyrians in Iraq
- List of Assyrian settlements
- List of largest cities of Iraq
