= History of Mar Qardagh =

The History of Mar Qardagh is a Syriac martyrdom text pertaining to Qardagh, a Sasanian military leader and noble who converted from Zoroastrianism to Christianity. Though the narrative of the text is set during the reign of Shapur II (309-379 AD), it was written in the final decades of the Sasanian Empire.

== Publication history ==
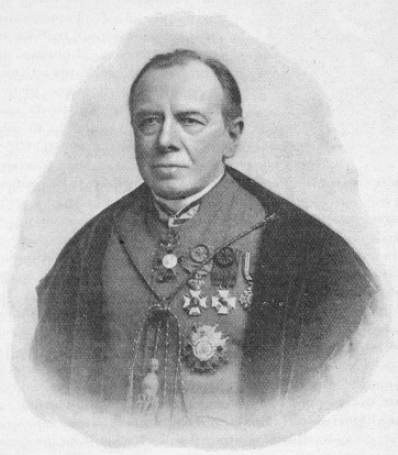
Photograph of Jean Baptiste Abbeloos in L'Université de Louvain. Coup d'oeil sur son histoire et ses institutions, 1425–1900, Bruxelles, Bulens, 1900, p. 91.

The text was first edited by Jean Baptiste Abbeloos, and published in his Acta Mar Kardaghi, Assyriae Praefecti, qui sub Sapore II Martyr Occubit, AB 9 (1890). The manuscript he used was an 1869 copy made in Mosul from an original medieval manuscript he had received from E. G. Khayyath, the Chaldean archbishop of Diyarbakır. The manuscript (MS Diyarbakir Syriac. 96) was dated by Khayyath to the seventh or eighth century AD. It also contains Acts of martyrs persecuted by the Sasanian Empire between the periods of the fourth and seventh century AD. The manuscript was originally stored at the church of St. Pathion in Diyarbakir but was displaced following the First World War. The manuscript was eventually transferred to Iraq where its current condition is unknown.

A second edition was also being published at Berlin in the same year as Abbeloos. In his Die Geschichte des Mâr 'Abhdîšô und seines Jüngers Mâr Qardagh (Kiel:C. F. Haesler, 1890), Hermann Feige introduced a German translation. He primarily used a mid-eighth century Syriac manuscript from Rustaqa along with variants from two late manuscripts written at Alqosh and in the nearby Rabban Hormizd Monastery.

The third edition of the text was published by Paul Bedjan in his Acta Martyrum et Sanctorum (1891). His text is established upon Abbeloos's version with variants from the 1869 Mosul copy, and another from the late nineteenth century that was acquired from missionary M. Salomon of the Lake Urmia region.

Joel Walker translated the text from Syriac to English, and was published in his The Legend of Mar Qardagh: Narrative and Christian Heroism in Late Antique Iraq. (2006). He based his translation on Abbeloos's text.

== Content ==
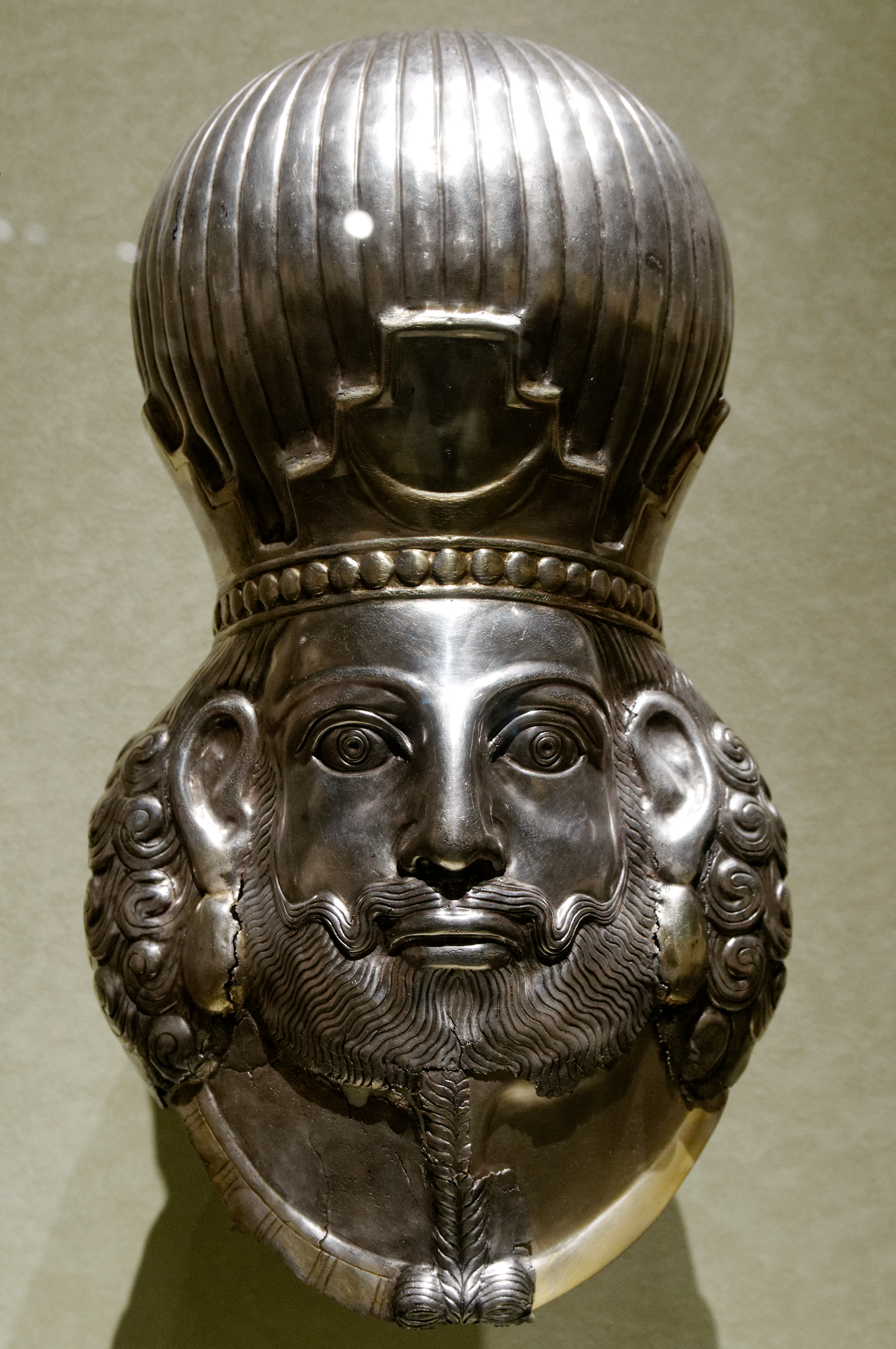
Bust of Shapur II, ca. 4th century

The following structure of the text is summarized by Philip Wood in The Chronicle of Seert: Christian Historical Imagination in Late Antique Iraq (2013). Though he refers to the text as the Acts of Mar Qardagh, he is basing it off of Joel Walker's translation. The setting of the texts takes place in Melqi, Adiabene of northern Iraq during the reign of Shapur II.

- The text commences by emphasizing the significance of Mar Qardagh's lineage from the Assyrian kings. If further continues with his construction of a fortress and fire temple upon a hilltop in Melqi. Mar Qardagh then receives a vision from a figure who foretells Mar Qardagh's death. Mar Qardagh's ability to polo and hunt is rendered useless, however, he pursues an Iranian aristocrat.
- Mar Qardagh converts to Christianity after a conversation he had with a Christian man. Mar Qardagh then proceeded to give away his wealth to Christian monasteries.
- Despite his conversion, he continued to battle the Romans while wearing a relic of the True Cross.
- When his fighting with the Romans is concluded, Mar Qardagh returned to his fire temple to have it re-established as a church. A magi informs Shapur II of Mar Qardagh's church, so Shapur requested Mar Qardagh to perform Zoroastrian rituals.
- Mar Qardagh refuses. Fearing rebellion, Shapur sends his armies against Mar Qardagh but were defeated. Mar Qardagh is later stoned to death by his father in front of Pagans, Jews, and Christians.
- The text is concluded by stating a great market and a great church was established in Melqi.

== Sources ==
- Smith, Kyle (2019). Constantine and the Captive Christians of Persia: Martyrdom and Religious Identity in Late Antiquity. University of California Press. ISBN 9780520308398.
- Walker, Joel (2006). The Legend of Mar Qardagh: Narrative and Christian Heroism in Late Antique Iraq. University of California Press. ISBN 9780520932197.
- Wood, Philip (2013). The Chronicle of Seert: Christian Historical Imagination in Late Antique Iraq. Oxford University Press. ISBN 9780199670673.
