= Audishu V Khayyath =

Head of the Chaldean Catholic Church from 1894 to 1899

- Patriarch of Babylon of the Chaldeans
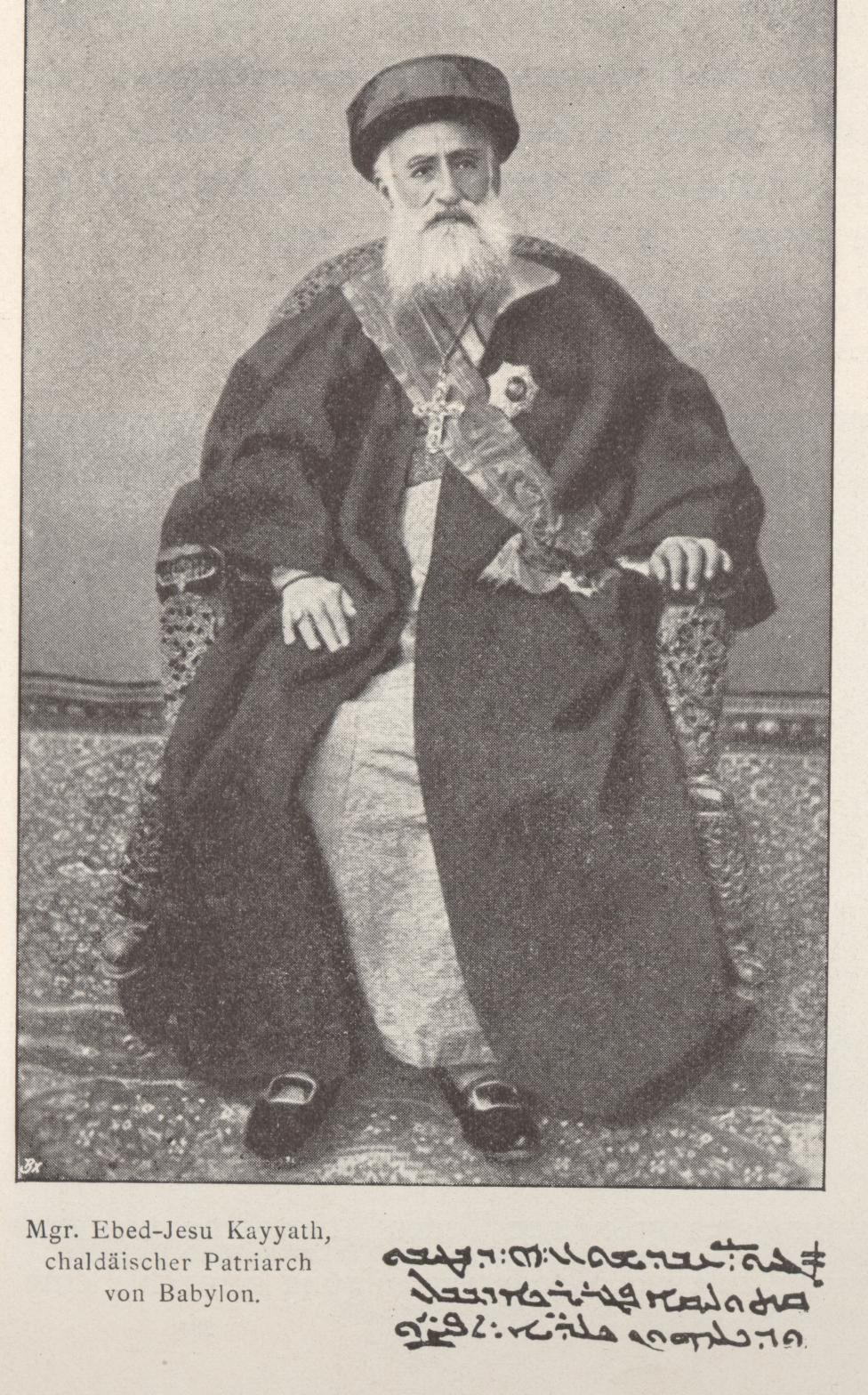
- Church: Chaldean Catholic Church
- Archdiocese: Babylon
- See: Babylon of the Chaldeans
- Installed: October 28, 1894
- Term ended: November 06, 1899
- Predecessor: Eliya XIV [XIII] Abulyonan
- Successor: Yousef VI Emmanuel II Thomas

Orders
- Ordination: 1855 (Priest)
- Consecration: 23 Sept 1860 (Bishop) by Joseph Audo

Personal details
- Born: Georges Ebed-Iesu Khayyath; October 15, 1827
- Died: November 6, 1899 (aged 72)
- Residence: Iraq

Mar Audishu V, (Ebed-Jesu V), Georges Khayyath (or Abdisho V, Giwargis Hayyat) (Arabic: مار جرجيس عبد يشوع الخامس خياط) (October 15, 1827 – November 6, 1899) was the patriarch of the Chaldean Catholic Church from 1894 to his death in 1899. He was also an Aramaic-language scholar.

He is remembered also as editor of the Mosul Edition of the Chaldean Peshitta. He wrote a book titled Romanorum Pontificum Primatus.

== Life ==
He was born on October 15, 1827, in Mossul. He studied in the Congregation for the Propagation of the Faith in Rome and was ordained priest in 1855. On 23 September 1860 he was ordained Bishop of Amadiyah, Iraq, by Patriarch Joseph Audo. He was the patriarchal vicar of Mossul from 1863 to 1870 and metropolitan of Amid from 1874 to 1894. He was appointed Patriarch of the Chaldean Church on October 28, 1894, and served till his death on November 6, 1899. He died and was buried at the church of Mary mother of sorrows in Baghdad, modern day Iraq. He replaced Patriarch Eliya XIV [XIII] Abulyonan and was followed by Yousef VI Emmanuel II Thomas.

== Images ==
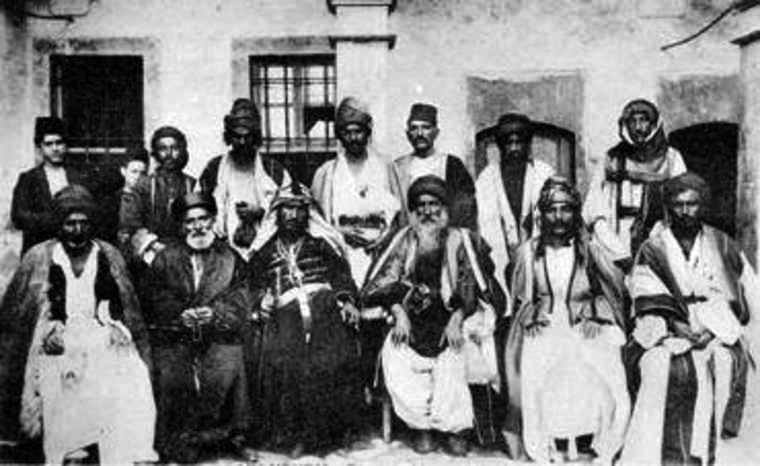
Audishu V Khayyath meets with Yazidi leaders in Mosul, c. 1895

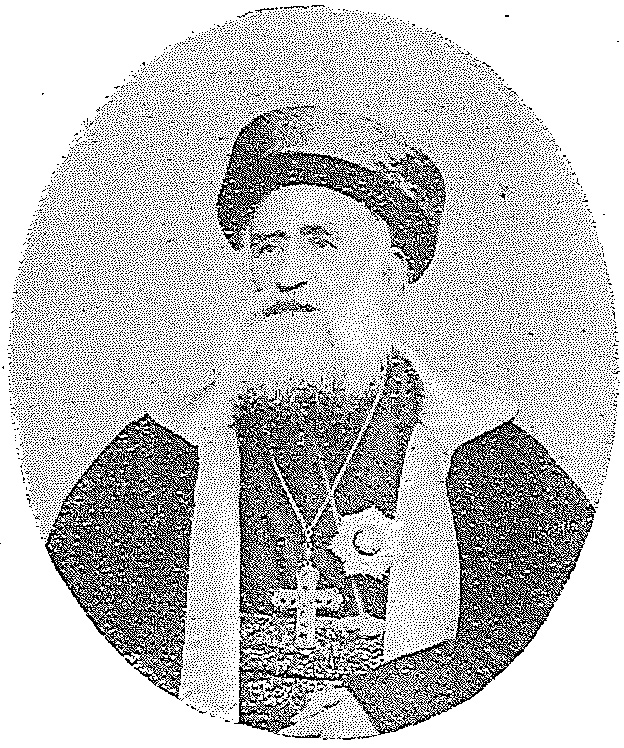
Audishu V Khayyath

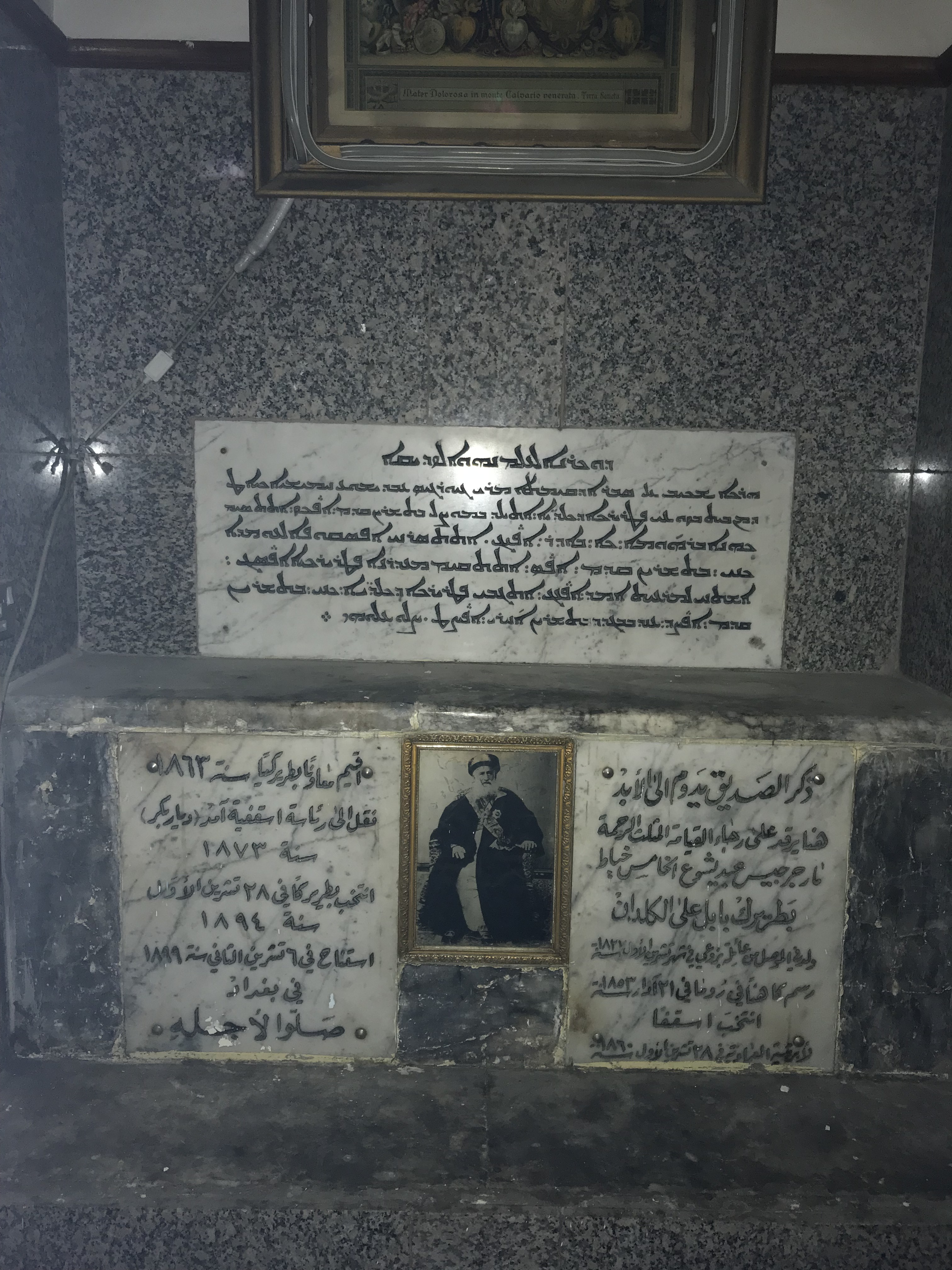
Mar Audishu V Khayyath grave at a Baghdad Chaldean church, Iraq, buried in 1899

== Sources ==
- Wilmshurst, David (2000). The Ecclesiastical Organisation of the Church of the East, 1318–1913. Louvain: Peeters Publishers. ISBN 9789042908765.
- "Archbishop Audishu V (Georges Ebed-Iesu) Khayyath". Catholic-Hierarchy.org.

Preceded by Eliya XIV Abulyonan (1878–1894)	Patriarch of Babylon of the Chaldean Catholic Church; 1894–1899	Succeeded by Yousef VI Emmanuel II Thomas (1900–1946)
