= St. George's Church, Ankawa =

Chaldean Catholic church in Ankawa, Iraq

St. George's Church is the oldest Chaldean Catholic church in Ankawa, Iraq.

== History ==
St. George's Church was probably built in 816, but parts of the church may date back to the fourth century. In 1995 the church building was restored. During the restoration, several carved stones were found. The engraving on one stone says that the church was rebuilt in 816 AD. A second stone mentions the death of Father Hormuz, a priest in Ankawa in 917 AD and the stone says Ankawa's name was then called Amku.

== Patron Saint ==
The patron saint of this church is known as St. George. Before he became a Christian his name was Maherkoushap. St. George after was born in 576 AD in a branch of the Sasanian royal family. The 20-year-old was baptized in 596. He became a monk at Mount Izla in northern Iraq and southern Turkey. When the Persian king heard that George changed his religion, he arrested and killed George in 615.

He is an important saint in the Church of the East. On 24 April there is a feast for St. George and he is celebrated in Ankawa.
