= Yousef VII Ghanima =

Head of the Chaldean Catholic Church from 1947 to 1958

- Patriarch of Babylon of the Chaldeans
- Church: Chaldean Catholic Church
- Archdiocese: Babylon
- See: Babylon of the Chaldeans
- Installed: September 17, 1947
- Term ended: July 8, 1958
- Predecessor: Yousef VI Emmanuel II Thomas
- Successor: Paul II Cheikho

Orders
- Ordination: May 15, 1904 (Priest)
- Consecration: May 10, 1925 (Bishop) by Yousef VI Thomas

Personal details
- Born: Yousef Ghanima; January 29, 1881
- Died: July 8, 1958 (aged 77)
- Residence: Iraq

Mar Yousef VII Ghanima (January 29, 1881 – July 8, 1958) was the patriarch of the Chaldean Catholic Church from 1947 until his death in 1958.

== Life ==
Mar Yousef VII Ghanima was born on January 29, 1881, in Mosul and was ordained a priest on May 15, 1904. An ethnic Assyrian, in 1925 he was ordained Auxiliary Bishop of the Chaldean Catholic Patriachate of Baghdad. He became the Patriarch of the Chaldean Church on September 17, 1947 and held the office until his death on July 8, 1958. He was preceded by Patriarch Yousef VI Emmanuel II Thomas and was succeeded by Paul II Cheikho.

With help from Mar Yousef VII Ghanima, the Patriarchate transferred from Mosul to Baghdad.

He was buried in the cemetery of St. Joseph church in Baghdad.

Catholic Church titles
| Preceded by Yousef VI Emmanuel II Thomas (1900–1946) | Patriarch of Babylon of the Chaldean Catholic Church; 1947–1958 | Succeeded by Paul II Cheikho (1958–1989) |
