= Paul II Cheikho =

Head of the Chaldean Catholic Church from 1958 to 1989

- Patriarch of Babylon of the Chaldeans
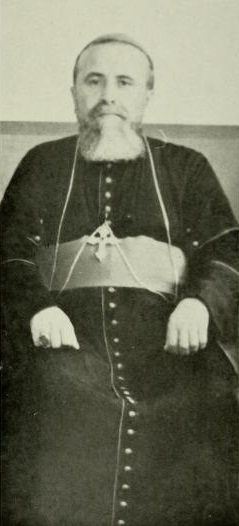
- Church: Chaldean Catholic Church
- Archdiocese: Babylon
- See: Babylon of the Chaldeans
- Installed: December 13, 1958
- Term ended: April 13, 1989
- Predecessor: Yousef VII Ghanima
- Successor: Raphael I Bidawid

Orders
- Ordination: Febr 16, 1930 (Priest)
- Consecration: May 4, 1947 (Bishop) by Hormisdas Djibri

Personal details
- Born: Paul Cheikho; November 19, 1906 Alqosh
- Died: April 13, 1989 (aged 82)
- Residence: Iraq

Mar Paul II Cheikho † (Syriac: ܦܘܠܘܣ ܬܪܝܢܐ ܫܝܟܘ, Arabic: بولس الثاني شيخو) (November 19, 1906 – April 13, 1989) was the patriarch of the Chaldean Catholic Church from 1958 until his death in 1989.

== Life ==
An ethnic Assyrian, he was born on November 19, 1906, in Alqosh and was ordained a priest on February 16, 1930. On May 4, 1947, he was ordained Bishop of Akra, Iraq, at the age of 40, by the Archbishop of Kirkuk Hormisdas Etienne Djibri.

From 1957 until his appointment as Patriarch of Babylon of the Chaldeans in 1958 Paul Cheikho served as bishop of Aleppo, Syria. He was the Patriarch of the Chaldean Church from 1958 until his death on April 13, 1989. He replaced Patriarch Yousef VII Ghanima and was followed by Raphael I Bidawid.

== Notes ==
Religious titles
Preceded by Yousef VII Ghanima (1947–1958)	Patriarch of Babylon of the Chaldean Catholic Church; 1958–1989	Succeeded by Raphael I Bidawid (1989–2003)
