= Catholic University in Erbil =

University in the Kurdistan Region of Iraq

- ܒܹܝܬܼ ܨܵܘܒܵܐ ܩܵܬܼܘܿܠܝܼܩܵܝܵܐ ܒܐܲܪܒܝܠ (Classical Syriac) زانكۆى كاسۆليكى له ھەولێر (Central Kurdish) الجامعة الكاثوليكية في أربيل (Arabic)
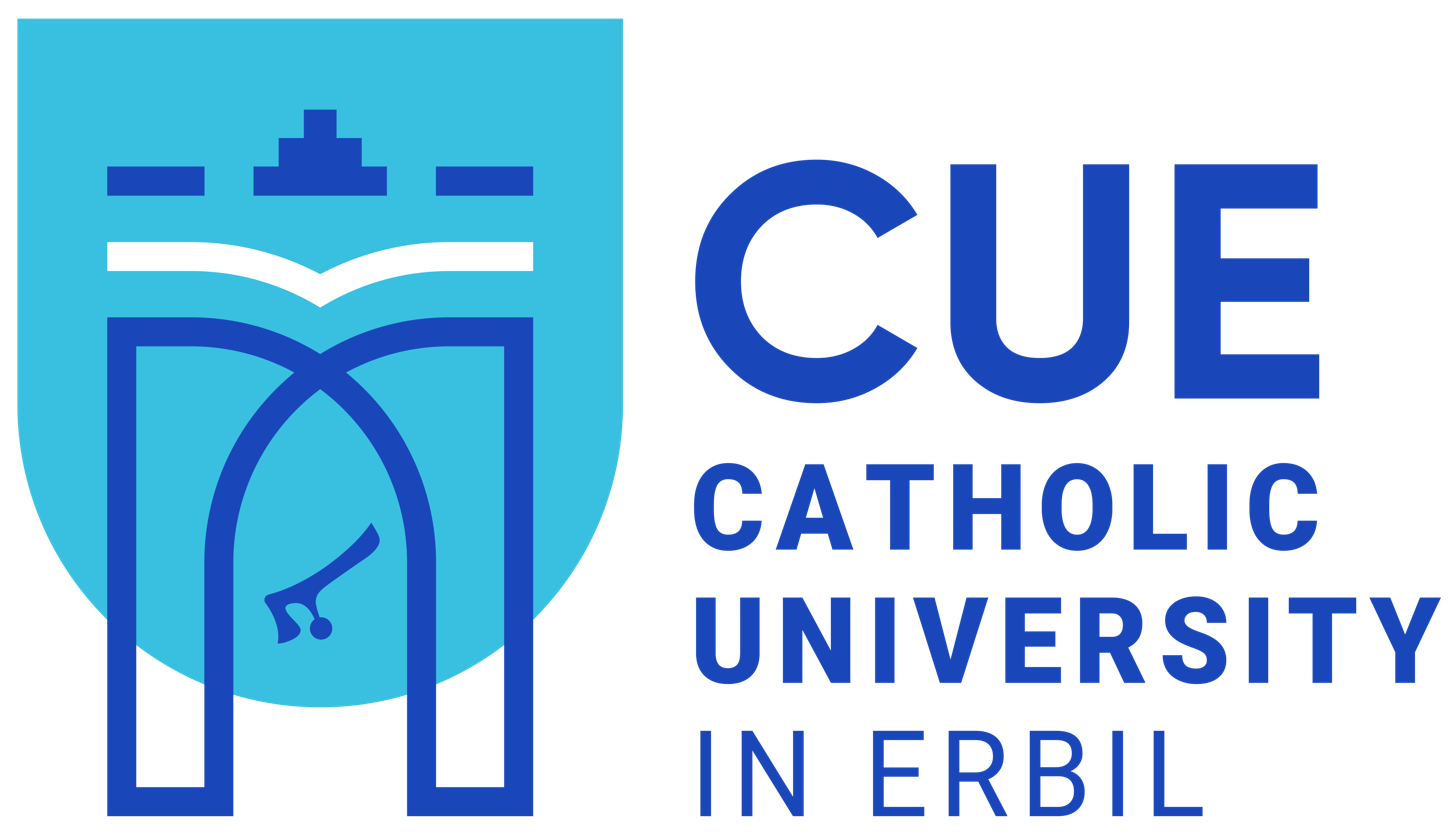
- Other name: CUE
- Motto: Where every student's story matters
- Type: Private
- Established: 8 December 2015
- Founder: Archbishop Bashar Warda
- Religious affiliation: Chaldean Catholic Church
- Chancellor: Paul III Nona
- President: Nazar Shabila
- Vice-Chancellor: Dankha Abdulmasih (Dankha Joola)
- Location: 189 District, Ankawa, Erbil, Kurdistan Region, Iraq, 44003; 36°13′46.3″N 44°00′43″E
- Campus: Urban
- Language: English
- Website: cue.edu.krd
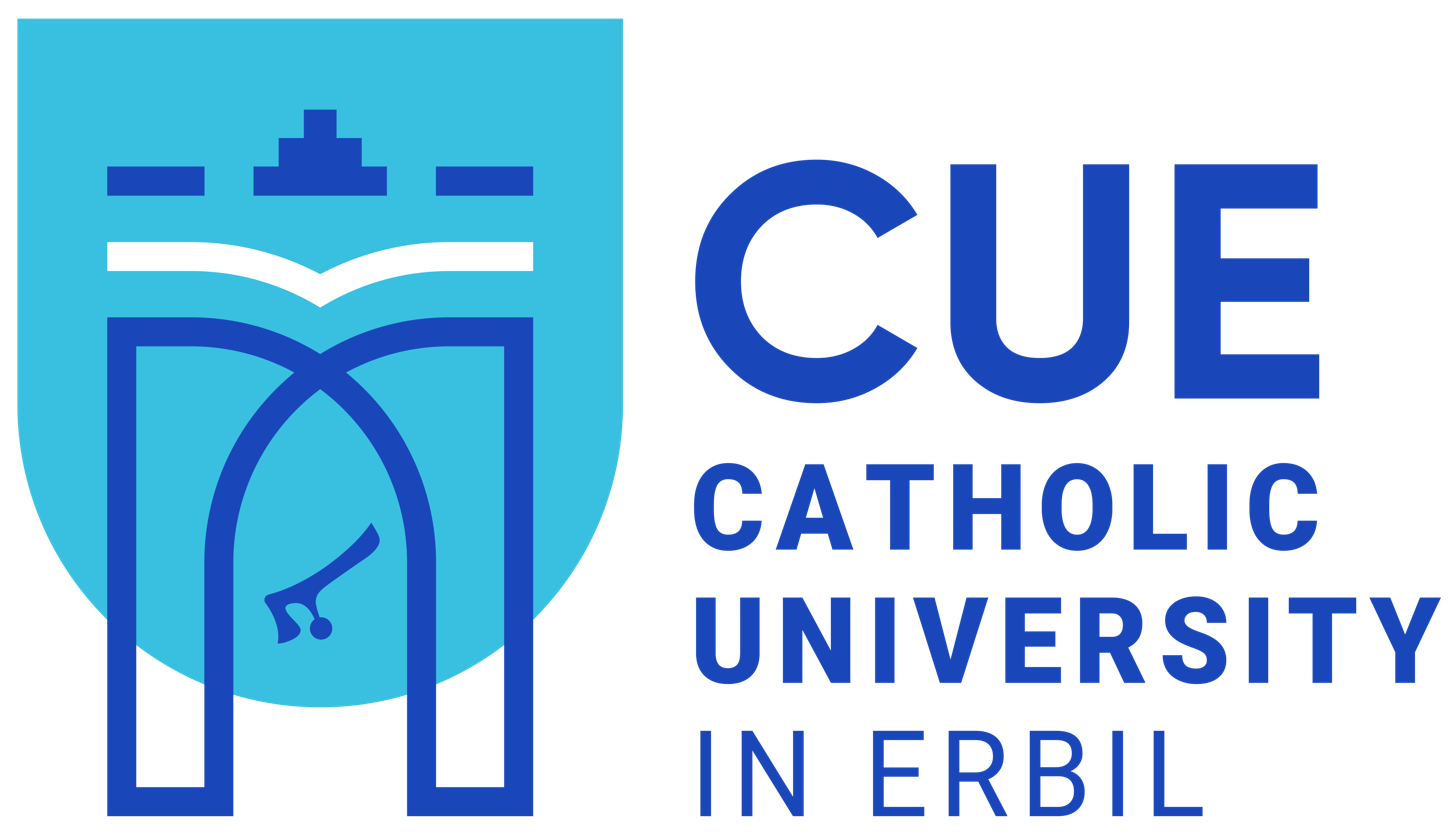

The Catholic University in Erbil (CUE) (Kurdish: زانکۆی کاتۆلیکی لە ھەولێر, romanized: Zankoy Katolîkî le Hewlêr, Syriac: ܒܹܝܬܼ ܨܵܘܒܵܐ ܩܵܬܼܘܿܠܝܼܩܵܝܵܐ ܒܐܲܪܒܝܠ) is a private non-profit institution of higher education and research located in the Erbil suburb of Ankawa, Kurdistan Region, Iraq.

It was founded in December 2015 by the Archbishop Bashar Warda of the Chaldean Catholic Church, and provides degrees in the arts and sciences recognized by the Kurdistan Regional Government (KRG).

Its foundation stone was laid on 20 October 2012. 30,000 square metres of land were made available for the campus. The Italian Episcopal Conference gave 2.3 million euros for the project, and the Holy Spirit University of Kaslik in Lebanon was contacted for help and guidance. Archbishop Bashar Warda also describes pontifical foundation Aid to the Church in Need as a crucial partner in the foundation of the university.

In an interview with ACN, he described the foundation of the institution. “With the shock of ISIS in 2014, the project became an urgent pastoral duty and obligation of care when thousands of families were forced to leave Mosul and the Nineveh Plain. Apart from pastoral and humanitarian care, we needed to continue their education.”

He added that the opportunity for local Christians to pursue higher education is fundamental to stemming the exodus from Iraq. "If parents know their children will be educated, then they are more likely to remain in Iraq.”

== Academic programs ==
- International relations
- English language
- Information technology
- Computer sciences
- Accounting
- Architecture
- Civil engineering
- Medical laboratory sciences
- Pharmacy
- Nursing
- Digital media
- Business management
- Economics
- Oriental studies
