= Eliya Abulyonan =

Head of the Chaldean Catholic Church from 1878 to 1894

Eliya XIV [XIII] Abulyonan
- Patriarch of Babylon of the Chaldeans
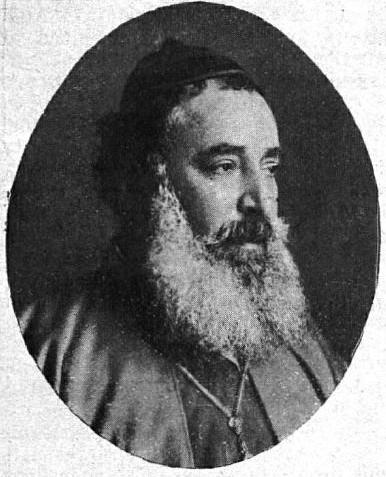
- Church: Chaldean Catholic Church
- Archdiocese: Babylon
- See: Babylon of the Chaldeans
- Installed: July 26, 1878
- Term ended: June 27, 1894
- Predecessor: Joseph Audo
- Successor: Audishu V Khayyath

Orders
- Ordination: 1865 (Priest)
- Consecration: May 24, 1874 (Bishop) by Joseph Audo

Personal details
- Born: Eliya Peter Abulyonan; 1840 Mosul
- Died: June 27, 1894 (aged 53–54) Mosul
- Residence: Iraq

Mar Eliya XIV [XIII] Abulyonan (or Abolionan) (1840 - June 27, 1894) was the patriarch of the Chaldean Catholic Church from 1878 to 1894.

== Life ==
Eliya Peter Abulyonan was born in 1840 in Mosul to an Assyrian family. He studied three years in the College of the Propaganda in Rome and was ordained priest in 1865. On May 24, 1874, in Alqosh, he was ordained bishop of Gazireh by Patriarch Joseph Audo. He was appointed Patriarch of the Chaldean Catholic Church on July 26, 1878, and confirmed by the pope on February 28, 1879.

During his patriarchate he spared no effort to improve the relations both with the Holy See and within the Chaldean Church, after the eventful reign of his predecessor Joseph Audo. He died in Mosul at the age of 54 on June 27, 1894.

The ordinal number of his title is sometime XIV, sometime XIII, while among scholars Eliya XII is often preferred. This is due to the uncertain list of the patriarchal line of Alqosh in the 16th and 17th centuries.

== Notes ==
Religious titles
Preceded by Joseph VI Audo (1847–1878)	Patriarch of Babylon of the Chaldean Catholic Church; 1878–1894	Succeeded by Audishu V Khayyath (1894–1899)
