= Cathedral of Saint Joseph, Ankawa =

Chaldean Catholic cathedral in Erbil, Iraqi Kurdistan

Coordinates: 36.2274°N 43.9922°E

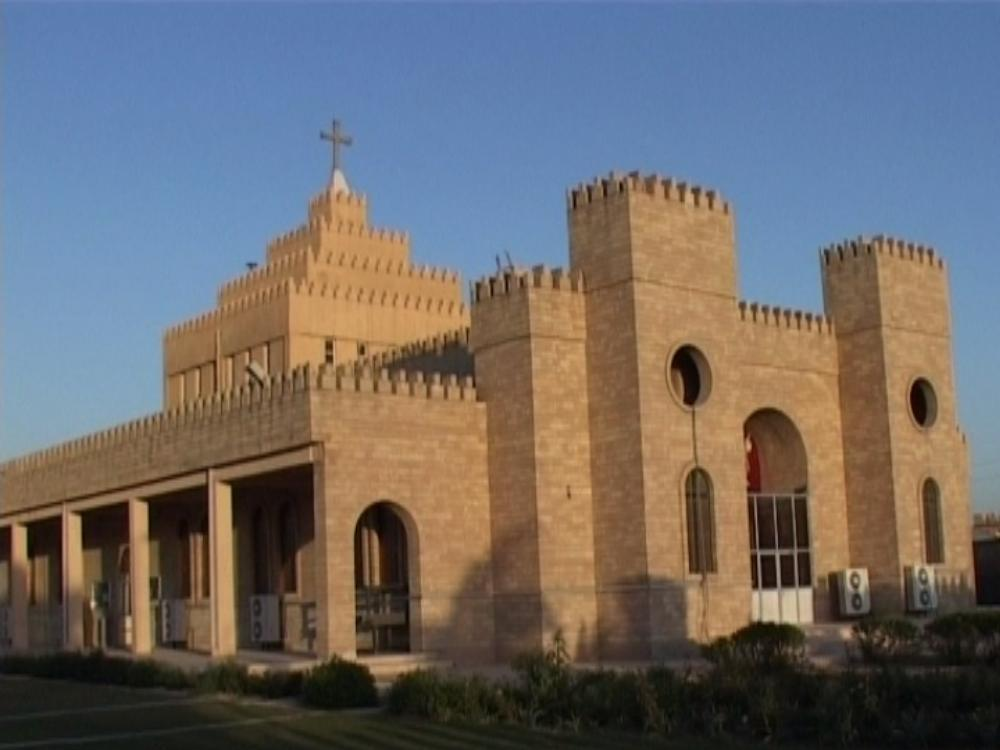

The Cathedral of Saint Joseph, Ankawa, also known as Cathedral of Mar Yousif, is the Chaldean Catholic cathedral and seat of the Chaldean Catholic Archdiocese of Erbil in Iraqi Kurdistan (Latin: Archieparchia Arbilensis Chaldaeorum, Arabic: إيبارشية أربيل الكلدانية) created under the pontificate of Pope Paul VI. The cathedral, named for Saint Joseph, follows the East Syriac Rite ("Chaldean Rite") of the Chaldean Catholic Church, one of the Eastern Catholic sui iuris particular churches that make up the Catholic Church in full communion with the Holy See in Rome.

== History ==
Construction of Saint Joseph's Church began on a 1000 sqm area at the entrance of Ankawa, Erbil, in 1978 while Stephan Babaka was archbishop of the Chaldean Catholic Archdiocese of Erbil. The church was built at government expense with volunteer labor from the people of Ankawa and consecrated in 1981. Saint Joseph's Church was designed in distinctive Babylonian style including a main gate modeled on the Ishtar Gate, with a large yard, and big gardens.

In 2014, Saint Joseph became a shelter for refugees that fled from the violence of the Islamic State of Iraq and Syria.
