= Chaldean Catholic Archeparchy of Arbil =

Eastern Catholic archeparchy in Kurdistan, Iraq

Coordinates: 36.1833°N 44.0000°E

Archeparchy of Erbil of the Chaldeans Archieparchia Arbilensis Chaldaeorum إيبارشية أربيل الكلدانية
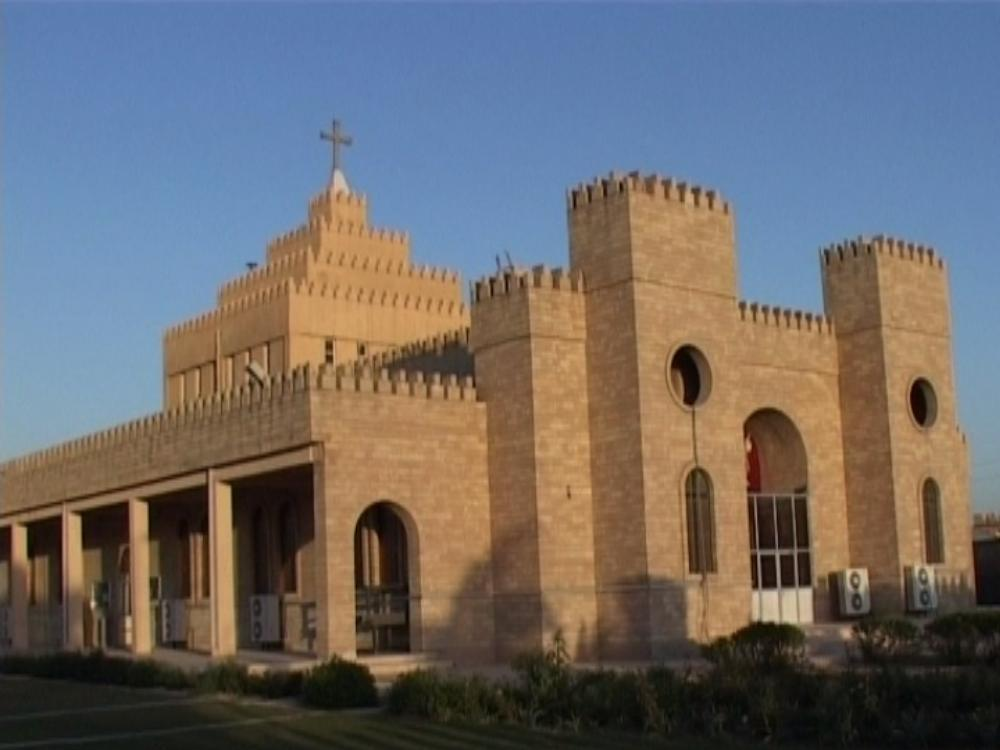
- Mar Yousif Cathedral in Ankawa, Erbil

Location
- Country: Iraq
- Ecclesiastical province: Immediately Subject to the Patriarchal See of Babylon

Information
- Denomination: Catholic Church
- Sui iuris church: Chaldean Catholic Church
- Rite: East Syriac Rite
- Established: 7 March 1968
- Cathedral: Mar Yousif Cathedral

Current leadership
- Pope: Leo XIV
- Patriarch: Louis Raphael I Sako
- Archbishop: Bashar Matti Warda

Website
- chaldeanchurcherbil.org www.adiabene.com

The Chaldean Catholic Archdiocese of Erbil (Latin: Archieparchia Arbilensis Chaldaeorum, Arabic: إيبارشية أربيل الكلدانية) is a Chaldean Catholic diocese with its seat in Erbil, Kurdistan Region. Erected in 1968 with territory taken from the Archeparchy of Kirkuk, it is immediately subject to the Patriarchal See of Babylon. The see of the archbishop is the Cathedral of St. Joseph (Mar Yousif) in Ankawa, a suburb of Erbil.

Under Archbishop Bashar Warda, the archdiocese expanded its activity by creating the Catholic University in Erbil and several youth and healthcare agencies. In particular, the Archdiocese took a leading role in the care of Christians displaced from Mosul and the Nineveh Plains after the ISIS invasion of those areas in 2014. During this period, Ankawa and Erbil became the center of Christianity in Iraq.

In March 2026 a drone struck and damaged a Church-owned building in Ankawa. The event unsettled the community, but no motive was ever ascertained, and no other attacks occurred in the following months.

== Ordinaries ==
- Stéphane Babaca (1969–1994)
- Hanna Markho (1994–1996)
- Jacques Ishaq (1997–1999)
- Yacoub Denha Scher (2001–2005)
- Bashar Warda (2010–present)
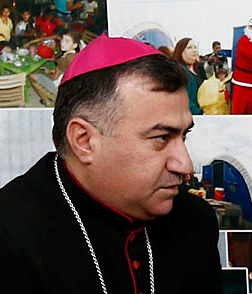
Bashar Warda 2015

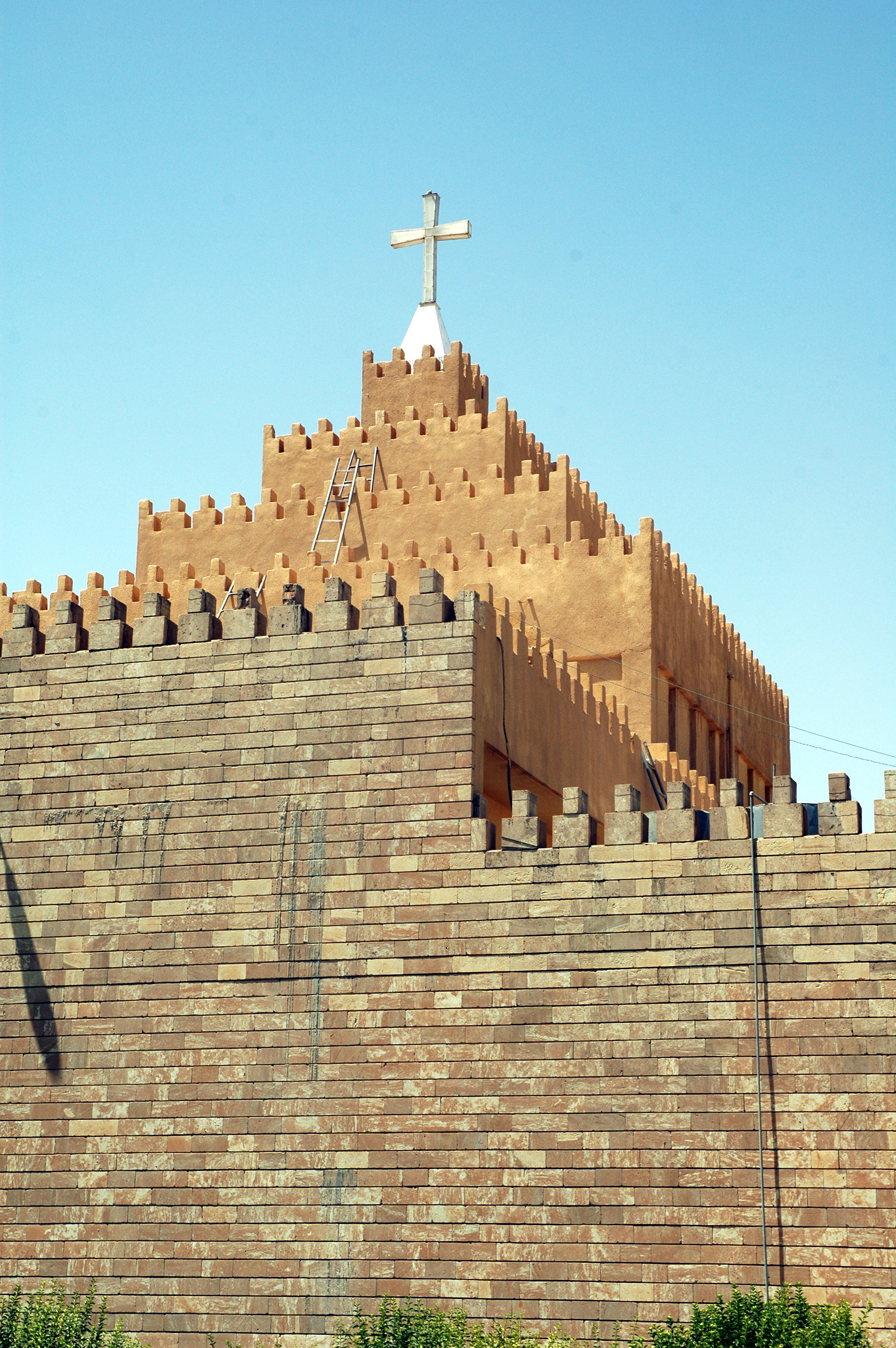
St Joseph's Cathedral, Ankawa
