= Raphael I Bidawid =

Head of the Chaldean Catholic Church from 1989 to 2003

- Patriarch of Babylon of the Chaldeans
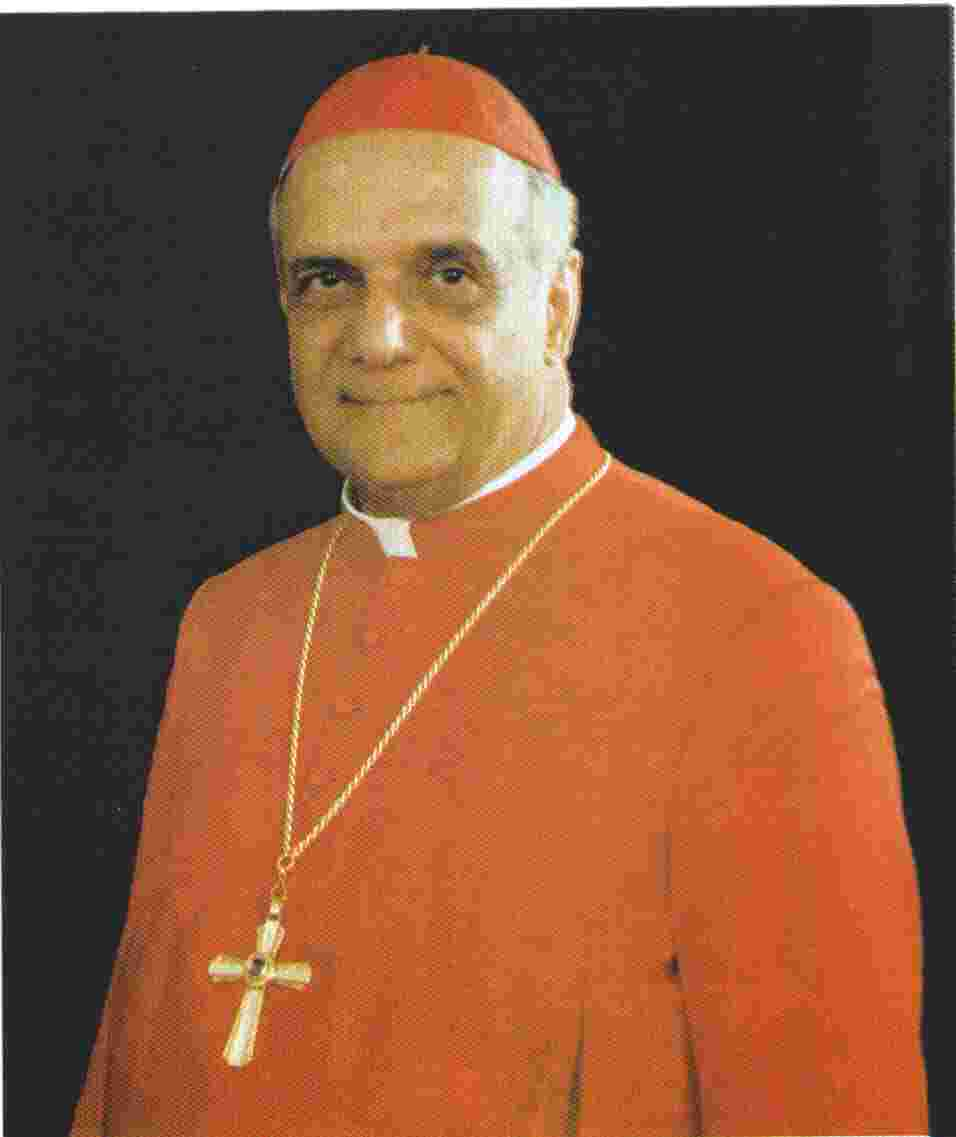
- Church: Chaldean Catholic Church
- Archdiocese: Babylon
- See: Babylon
- Installed: May 21, 1989
- Term ended: July 7, 2003
- Predecessor: Paul II Cheikho
- Successor: Emmanuel III Delly

Orders
- Ordination: October 22, 1944
- Consecration: October 6, 1957 by Yousef VII Ghanima

Personal details
- Born: Raphael J. Bidawid; April 17, 1922 Mosul, Iraq
- Died: July 7, 2003 (aged 81) Beirut, Lebanon
- Residence: Iraq

Mar Raphael I Bidawid (Syriac: ܪܘܦܐܝܠ ܩܕܡܝܐ ܒܝܬ ܕܘܝܕ, Arabic مار روفائيل الاول بيداويد) (April 17, 1922 – July 7, 2003) was the Patriarch of the Chaldean Catholic Church from 1989–2003. He was also a Syriac scholar.

== Life ==
He was born on April 17, 1922, in the northern Iraqi city of Mosul into an ethnic Assyrian family, and took his school and seminar training in Mosul. He was ordained a priest on October 22, 1944 in Rome and in 1946 he obtained the academic degrees of doctor of philosophy and theology. Between 1948 and 1956, he worked as a professor of philosophy and theology in Mosul. On October 6, 1957, at the age of 35, he was ordained Bishop of Amadiya, by Patriarch Yousef VII Ghanima, becoming the youngest Catholic bishop in the world. As bishop of Amadiya he experienced the mass exodus of Christians from Iraq. Mar Raphael Bidawid was then appointed bishop of Beirut, Lebanon in 1966 and served in this capacity for 23 years.

On March 21, 1989 Raphael I Bidawid was elected Patriarch of Babylon, head of the Chaldean Catholic Church. His election was confirmed by Pope John Paul II in June of 1989. During his patriarchate, in agreement with the Chaldean Synod, he established The Pontifical Babel College for Philosophy and Theology in 1991. The Babel College is situated in Baghdad, Dora, El-Mekaniek, next to St. Peter Chaldean Seminary. The Babel College became an instrumental educational institution for the Chaldean Catholic Church. Patriarch Bidawid could speak 13 languages. He died in Beirut, Lebanon, on July 7, 2003, at the age of 81.

== Pastoral work ==
Patriarch Bidawid was known as a champion of the unification of the Assyrian Church of the East (formerly the Church of the East) and the Chaldean Catholic Church, which split in 1552 AD. In November of 1996, Mar Dinkha IV of the Assyrian Church of the East and Raphael I Bidawid of the Chaldean Catholic Church met in Southfield, Michigan, and signed a Joint Patriarchal Statement that committed their two churches to working towards reintegration and pledged cooperation on pastoral questions such as the drafting of a common catechism, the setting up of a common seminary in the Chicago-Detroit area, the preservation of the Assyrian language, and other common pastoral programs between parishes and dioceses around the world.

On August 15, 1997, the two Patriarchs met again, in Roselle, Illinois, and ratified a “Joint Synodal Decree for Promoting Unity,” that had been signed by the members of both Holy Synods. It restated the areas of pastoral cooperation envisaged in the Joint Patriarchal Statement, recognized that Assyrians and Chaldean Catholics should come to accept each other’s diverse practices as legitimate, formally implemented the establishment of an Assyrian-Chaldean “Joint Commission for Unity,” and declared that each side recognized the apostolic succession, sacraments and Christian witness of the other. The text also spelled out the central concerns of both sides in the dialogue. While both churches wanted to preserve the Assyrian language and culture, the Assyrians of the Assyrian Church of the East were intent on retaining their freedom and self-governance, and the Chaldean Catholic Assyrians affirmed the necessity of maintaining full communion with Rome.

In an interview with Bidawid, published in 2003, he commented on the Assyrian name dispute and declared his ethnic point of view:

“I personally think that these different names serve to add confusion. The original name of our Church was the ‘Church of the East’ ... When a portion of the Church of the East became Catholic, the name given was ‘Chaldean’ based on the Magi kings who came from the land of the Chaldean, to Bethlehem. The name ‘Chaldean’ does not represent an ethnicity... We have to separate what is ethnicity and what is religion... I myself, my sect is Chaldean, but ethnically, I am Assyrian.”

In an interview with the Assyrian Star in the September–October 1974 issue, he was quoted as saying:

"Before I became a priest I was an Assyrian, before I became a bishop I was an Assyrian, I am an Assyrian today, tomorrow, forever, and I am proud of it".

== Bibliography ==
- Raphael J. Bidawid, Les lettres du patriarche nestorien Timothee I, Studi e Testi 187, Vatican City (1956)

== Notes ==
Religious titles
Preceded by Paul II Cheikho (1958–1989)	Patriarch of Babylon of the Chaldean Catholic Church; 1989–2003	Succeeded by Emmanuel III Delly (2003–2012)
