= Jean Baptiste Abbeloos =

Belgian orientalist and Rector of the University of Leuven

The Reverend Monsignor Jean Baptiste Abbeloos
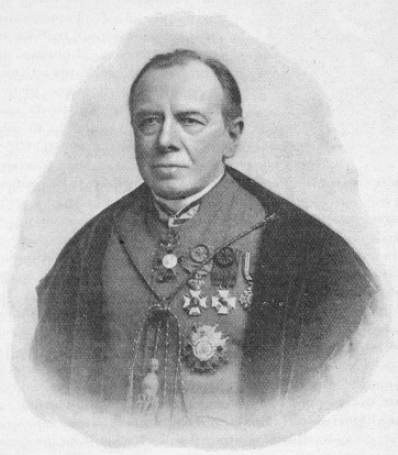
- Born: 15 January 1836; Gooik, Belgium
- Died: 25 February 1906 (aged 70); Leuven, Belgium
- Theological work
- Language: French

Jean Baptiste Abbeloos (15 January 1836 – 25 February 1906) was a Belgian orientalist and rector of the University of Leuven.

== Life ==
He was born on 15 January 1836 in Gooik, Belgium. He was educated at the junior seminary and the Major Seminary, Mechelen from 1849 to 1860. After his ordination to the priesthood on 22 September 1860, he studied at Leuven and Rome, devoting himself especially to Syriac language and literature. He received the degree of Doctor of Theology from the University of Leuven on 15 July 1867 and spent the following winter in London.

On his return to Belgium, he was appointed Professor of Holy Scripture in the seminary of Mechelen. Failing health obliged him to abandon the work of teaching, and he became, in 1876, pastor at Duffel. He was appointed in 1883 vicar-general under Cardinal Deschamps and held that position until 10 February 1887, when he was appointed rector of the University of Leuven.

During his administration the University grew rapidly in equipment and organization. He retired in 1900 and died on 25 February 1906.

== Honours ==
- 1887: Knight in the Order of Leopold.
- 1897: Commandor in the Order of Leopold.
- 1892: Ecomom. Order of Isabella the Catholic.
- 1894: Officer in the Order of the Oak Crown.

== Works ==
His published works are:

- De vitâ et scriptis S. Jacobi Sarugensis (Leuven, 1867);
- Gregorii Barhebraei Chronicon Ecclesiasticum (Paris and Leuven, 1872–77);
- Acta Sancti Maris (Brussels and Leipzig, 1885);
- Acta Mar Kardaghi Martyris (Brussels, 1900).
