= Armand Blanquet du Chayla (bishop) =

French bishop

Armand Etienne Marie Blanquet du Chayla OCD
- Archbishop of Baghdad
- Church: Catholic Church
- Archdiocese: Archdiocese of Baghdad
- In office: 1 April 1939 – 17 September 1964
- Predecessor: François Berré
- Successor: Maurice Perrin
- Other post: Titular Archbishop of Dercos (1964-1970)
- Previous post: Apostolic Delegate to Iraq (1948-1964)

Orders
- Ordination: 23 December 1932
- Consecration: 29 June 1939 by Achille Liénart

Personal details
- Born: 10 April 1887 Brest, Finistère, France
- Died: 27 November 1970 (aged 83)

Armand Etienne Marie Blanquet du Chayla, OCD (10 April 1887 – 27 November 1970) was a French prelate of the Catholic Church who worked in Iraq as a missionary, an archbishop from 1939 to 1964, and as apostolic delegate from 1948 to 1964.

== Biography ==
Armand Blanquet du Chayla was born on 10 April 1887 in Brest, France. He was ordained a priest of the Discalced Carmelites on 23 December 1892. His Carmelite name was Father Stephen of the Sacred Heart.

On 18 April 1939 Pope Pius XII appointed him Archbishop of Baghdad. He received his episcopal consecration on 29 June 1939 from Cardinal Achille Liénart, Bishop of Lille. His appointment came at a delicate juncture, when the Iraqi government was suspicious of the French, but he was at least familiar as head of the Carmelite mission and did not add yet another competing personality to the Catholic leadership. His success in distancing himself from French interests made possible his assumption of diplomatic duties on behalf of the Holy See a decade later.

On 20 November 1948, Pope Pius named him Apostolic Delegate to Iraq.

He resigned as Delegate and Archbishop of Baghdad on 17 September 1964 at the age of 77 and was assigned the titular see of Darcos. His resignation was prompted by health problems.

Blanquet du Chayla died on 27 November 1970 at the age of 83.
