= Hilário Moser =

Brazilian Roman Catholic bishop (born 1931)

The Most Reverend Hilário Moser S.D.B.
- Bishop Emeritus of Tubarão
- Church: Catholic Church
- Archdiocese: Florianópolis
- Diocese: Tubarão
- Appointed: 27 May 1992
- Term ended: 15 June 2004
- Predecessor: Osório Bebber
- Successor: Jacinto Bergmann
- Other posts: Titular bishop of Casae Calanae (1988–1992); Auxiliary bishop of Olinda e Recife (1988–1992)

Orders
- Ordination: 15 August 1958
- Consecration: 20 November 1988 by Carlo Furno

Personal details
- Born: 2 December 1931 (age 94) Rio dos Cedros, Santa Catarina, Brazil
- Education: Salesian Pontifical University
- Motto: Iuxta Matrem

Hilário Moser, S.D.B. (born 2 December 1931) is a Brazilian Roman Catholic prelate, who served as bishop of the Diocese of Tubarão from 1992 to 2004. Previously he served as auxiliary bishop of the Archdiocese of Olinda e Recife and titular bishop of Casae Calanae.

== Early life and education ==
Moser was born on 2 December 1931 in Rio dos Cedros, in the state of Santa Catarina, Brazil.

He joined the religious congregation of the Salesians of Don Bosco and made his religious profession as a young man. He studied philosophy and theology in Salesian institutions in Brazil and later pursued advanced theological studies at the Salesian Pontifical University in Rome.

He was ordained a priest on 15 August 1958 in São Paulo. After his ordination he served as professor of dogmatic theology at the Instituto Teológico Pio XI in São Paulo and later became rector of the institute. Within the Salesian congregation he also served as provincial superior of the Salesian province of São Paulo and as director of the international Salesian studentate in Rome.

== Episcopal ministry ==
On 17 August 1988, Pope John Paul II appointed Moser auxiliary bishop of the Archdiocese of Olinda e Recife and titular bishop of Casae Calanae.

He received episcopal consecration on 20 November 1988 in São Paulo from Archbishop Carlo Furno, with José Cardoso Sobrinho and Luciano Pedro Mendes de Almeida serving as co-consecrators.

On 27 May 1992 he was appointed bishop of the Diocese of Tubarão in Santa Catarina. He governed the diocese until 15 June 2004, when Pope John Paul II accepted his resignation before reaching the canonical retirement age.

During his episcopacy he was involved in theological formation and pastoral work and served as a member of the doctrinal commission of the National Conference of Bishops of Brazil (CNBB).

== Later life ==
After his retirement, Moser became bishop emeritus of Tubarão and continued to participate in pastoral and educational activities of the Salesians of Don Bosco in Brazil.

He has also continued to write theological and spiritual reflections and has taken part in ecclesiastical and cultural events connected with Salesian institutions.

== Selected works ==
Moser has written numerous works on theology, spirituality and pastoral life, including:

- Caminhando com Maria
- O Concílio Vaticano II: Você conhece?
- Ressurreição – Glória de Cristo e nosso futuro
- Vocação: sentido à Vida
