= François Berré =

François Dominique Berré OP
- Archbishop of Baghdad
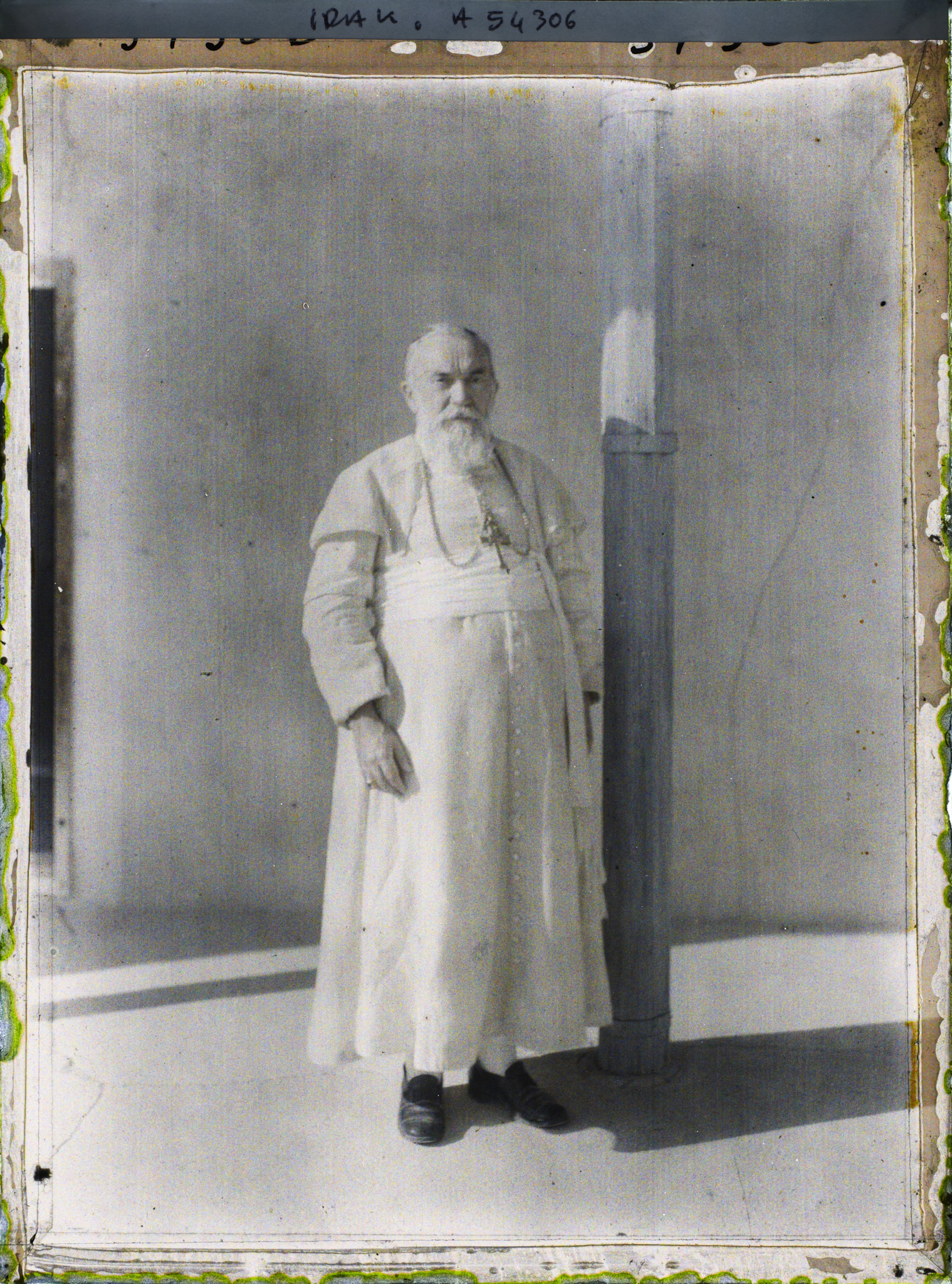
- Church: Catholic Church
- Archdiocese: Archdiocese of Baghdad
- In office: 9 August 1921 – 4 April 1929
- Predecessor: François Désiré Drure
- Successor: Armand Blanquet du Chayla
- Other post: Apostolic Delegate to Mesopotamia, Kurdistan, and Lesser Armenia (1904-1917)
- Previous post: Superior of Mosul (1907-1921)

Orders
- Ordination: 20 August 1882 by Eugène Lion
- Consecration: 19 March 1922 by François David

Personal details
- Born: 13 September 1857 Saint-Méen-le-Grand, Ille-et-Vilaine, French Empire
- Died: 4 April 1929 (aged 71) Mosul, Mosul Province, Mandatory Iraq, British Empire

François Dominique Berré, OP (13 September 1857 – 4 April 1929) was a French prelate of the Catholic Church who worked in Iraq as a missionary, bishop and apostolic delegate.

== Biography ==
François Dominique Berré was born on 13 September 1857 in Saint-Méen-le-Grand, France. He was ordained a priest of the Order of Friars Preachers (Dominicans) on 20 August 1882. As a Dominican his name was Father Marie Dominique.

In 1884 he began his missionary work in Mosul where he taught at the seminary and became head of the mission. After being imprisoned in Turkey for four years during the First World War and deported to France, he returned to rebuild the mission and its orphanage. He also documented the massacre of Christians in Mardin in a report to the French Ministry of Foreign Affairs.

On 9 August 1921, Pope Benedict XV appointed him Archbishop of Baghdad. He received his episcopal consecration on 19 March 1922 from François Daoud, Bishop of the Chaldean Catholic Eparchy of Amadiya.

On 19 September 1922, Pope Pius XI named him Apostolic Delegate to Mesopotamia, Kurdistan, and Lesser Armenia. He soon moved the delegation from Mosul to Baghdad and reported the details of the continuing persecution of Christians. He advocated for indigenous vocations with seminary training in local institutions rather than in Europe and believed that a Latin rite seminary could maintain students' ties to their non-Latin traditions and leaders.

Berré died in Mosul on 4 April 1929 at the age of 71.
