= Miriam Nerma =

Iraqi Journalist and teacher (1890–1972)

Mariam Nerma
- مريم نرمة
- Born: April 3, 1890
- Died: August 15, 1972 (aged 82); Baghdad, Iraq
- Citizenship: Iraqi
- Known for: Feminism advocacy and Journalism

Miriam Nerma, also known as Mariam Raphael Romaya Nerma (Arabic: مريم نرمة; 1890–1972) was an Iraqi journalist and teacher. Born to a Chaldean Catholic Assyrian family from Tel Keppe, she found her passion for writing in Baghdad. Her article, "To a Sect of Iraqis" (Arabic: الى طائفة من العراقيين), published in 1921, is considered the first article written by a woman to be published in a mainstream Iraqi newspaper. She wrote several articles for a number of journals and newspapers before starting her own newspaper, "The Arab Girl", in 1937, which advocated for woman's rights and discussed their place in Iraqi society.

== Early life ==
Miriam was born in 1890 (or 1885, according to some sources) as the sole girl among several brothers. According to Miriam's biography, her mother encouraged her to dedicate herself to education. It was unusual for girls to finish school at the time, but Miriam completed primary school and enrolled in a high school in Basra. After returning to Baghdad, where her family lived, she found her passion for writing and began a personal journal. She worked as a teacher and married her husband, Mansour Klousy, at the age of 23.

== First article ==
On 29 May 1921, an article written under the pseudonym "Chaldean Arab Iraqi" was published in the 11th issue, 4th volume of Dar Al-Salam newspaper. This article was later attributed to Miriam, who began writing under her own name few issues later. The article, titled "To a Sect of Iraqis", opens with a quote attributed to Napoleon Bonaparte: "If you want know the progress of a nation, look at it's [sic] women". In the article, the author argues that society can only progress with men and women working together. An interview in 1969, Miriam claimed authorship for the article, which is considered to be the first paper written by a woman to be published in an Iraqi newspaper.

== The Arab Girl newspaper ==
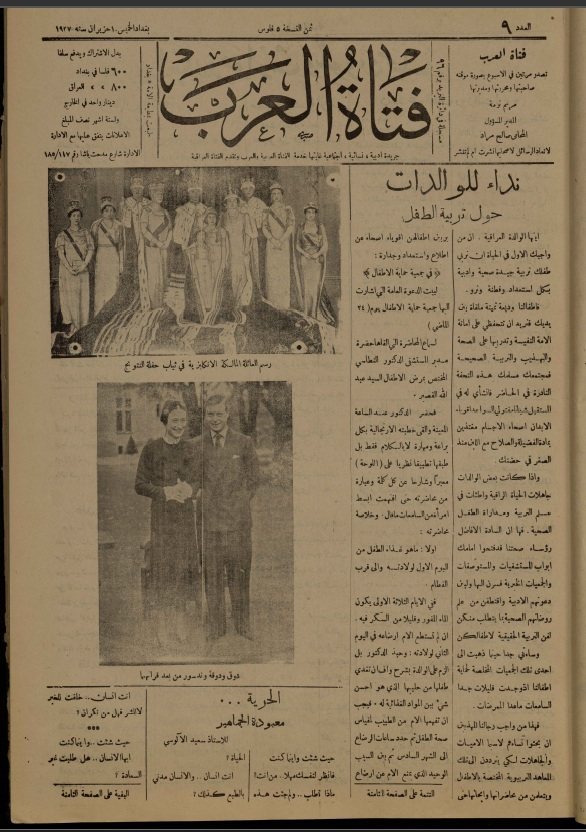
The Arab Girl Vol.9

Miriam continued to write for Dar Al-Salam newspaper and other newspapers. In 1937, she started her own newspaper, "The Arab Girl", a venture financed by Iraqi lawyer Salih Murad. Miriam served as manager and editor for the newspaper. The first issue was published on 6 May 1937, and Miriam wrote the opening article, in which she advocated for the advancement of women for the betterment of Iraqi society. Originally the newspaper was issued twice a week, but later shifted to a weekly release. The newspaper was well received but failed to be financially successful, causing Miriam to publish it from her home in Baghdad. The newspaper released only 24 issues.

== Later life and death ==
In 1969 Miriam was honored by the Iraqi government Ministry of Heritage for her pioneering role in Iraqi Journalism.

On August 15, 1972, Miriam died in her home in Baghdad at the age of 82. Her funeral, according to her will, was held at the Cathedral of St. Joseph. She donated her house to the Chaldean Churches and her extensive library to the Rabban Hormizd Monastery in Nineveh governorate, where she was buried.
