= Section for Relations with States =

Department of the Roman Curia

The Section for Relations with States (Italian: Congregazione per gli affari ecclesiastici straordinari, Latin: Congregatio pro negotiis ecclesiasticis extraordinariis) or Second Section of the Secretariat of State is the body within the Roman Curia charged with dealing with matters that involve relations with civil governments. It has been part of the Vatican Secretariat of State since 1909.

It is analogous to the foreign ministry of a state.

== History ==
The origin of this body is found in the Congregatio super negotiis ecclesiasticis extraordinariis Regni Galliarum (Congregation on the Extraordinary Ecclesiastical Affairs of the Kingdom of France) that Pope Pius VI set up on 28 May 1793 to deal with problems arising for the Church as a result of the French Revolution. After the fall of Napoleon, Pope Pius VII gave it competence for negotiations with all governments about ecclesiastical matters and renamed it the Congregatio extraordinaria praeposita negotiis ecclesiasticis orbis catholici (Extraordinary Congregation in Charge of Ecclesiastical Affairs of the Catholic World). Under Pope Leo XIII, its name was shortened to Congregatio pro negotiis ecclesiasticis extraordinariis (the Congregation for Extraordinary Ecclesiastical Affairs), which remained its title even after Pope Pius X in 1909 made it part of the Secretariat of State.

This arrangement was incorporated into the 1917 Code of Canon Law, which described the Secretariat of State as composed of three sections, of which this congregation was the first:

The Office of the Secretariat of State, presided over by the Cardinal Secretary of State, consists of three sections, in the following order:
1. The First Section, headed by the Secretary of the Congregation for Extraordinary Ecclesiastical Affairs, deals with the matters that must be submitted to it in accordance with canon 255, leaving other matters to specific Congregations in accordance with their different nature;
2. The Second Section, headed by the Substitute [i.e., Alternate Secretary of State), deals with ordinary matters;
3. The Third Section, headed by the Chancellor of Apostolic Briefs, deals with the despatch of Briefs.

In its canon 255, that Code defined the congregation's field of competence as erecting or dividing dioceses and appointing bishops where negotiations with civil governments were involved, and other matters that the Pope might choose to entrust to it, especially those in some linked to civil law and the Holy See's agreements and concordats with states. The Cardinal Secretary of State was concurrently prefect of the Congregation for Extraordinary Ecclesiastical Affairs with the secretary equalivant to the current secretary for Relations with States.

With the apostolic constitution Regimini Ecclesiae Universae of 15 August 1967, Pope Paul VI, following the recommendations of the Second Vatican Council, reorganized the Secretariat of State, suppressing the Chancery of Apostolic Briefs. He established what had been the First Section as a body distinct from the Secretariat of State, though closely related, and called it the Council for the Public Affairs of the Church. On 28 June 1988, Pope John Paul II issued the Apostolic Constitution Pastor Bonus, making that same body, under the name "Section for Relations with States", the second of two sections of the Secretariat of State, the first being the Section for General Affairs.

== Present competence ==
Articles 45–47 of Pastor Bonus indicate dealing with heads of government as the special task of the Section for Relations with States. Its field of competence includes fostering diplomatic and other relations with states and other subjects of public international law such as the United Nations and the European Union, dealing with matters of common interest to them and to the Holy See by means such as concordats and similar agreements, while respecting the views of interested episcopal conferences. It represents the Holy See at international organizations and conferences. Where agreements have been made with governments about appointments of bishops and the definition of dioceses, it makes the necessary arrangements in consultation with the congregation that has general competence for such matters in the country in question (generally the Congregation for Bishops).

== Composition ==
From the start, this body has been placed under the presidency of the Cardinal Secretary of State. Under him, it is headed by the Secretary for Relations with States, who is aided by a staff that includes the Undersecretary for Relations with States.

The current Secretary for Relations with States is Archbishop Paul Richard Gallagher, and the most recent Undersecretary is Monsignor Miroslav Wachowski.

== List of secretaries ==
Tenure	Incumbent	Notes
7 February 1953 – 26 June 1967	Antonio Samorè	appointed prefect of Sacred Congregation for Sacramental Discipline
15 August 1967 – 28 April 1979	Agostino Casaroli	appointed Pro-Secretary of State
4 May 1979 – 1 March 1988	Achille Silvestrini	appointed Prefect of the Apostolic Signatura
1 March 1986 – 1 December 1990	Angelo Sodano	appointed Pro-Secretary of State to His Holiness, later became Dean of the College of Cardinals
1 December 1990 – 6 October 2003	Jean-Louis Tauran	appointed Archivist of the Holy Roman Church, later became President of the Pontifical Council for Interreligious Dialogue, and Chamberlain of the Holy Roman Church
7 October 2003 – 15 September 2006	Giovanni Lajolo	appointed President of the Pontifical Commission for Vatican City State
15 September 2006 – 8 November 2014	Dominique Mamberti	appointed Prefect of the Apostolic Signatura
8 November 2014 – present	Paul Richard Gallagher	

== List of undersecretaries ==
Tenure	Incumbent	Notes
1989 – 1 December 1990	Jean-Louis Tauran	appointed Secretary of Relations with States
1992 – 16 December 1995	Claudio Maria Celli	appointed Secretary the Administration of the Patrimony of the Apostolic See
16 December 1995 – 30 October 2002	Celestino Migliore	appointed Permanent Observer of the Holy See to the United Nations
30 October 2002 – 17 August 2009	Pietro Parolin	appointed nuncio to Venezuela, later became Cardinal Secretary of State
17 August 2009 – 22 February 2013	Ettore Balestrero	appointed nuncio to Colombia
22 February 2013 – 3 September 2019	Antoine Camilleri	appointed nuncio to Ethiopia
24 October 2019 – 18 September 2025	Mirosław Stanisław Wachowski	appointed nuncio to Iraq
19 November 2025 – present	Mihăiţă Blaj	
