= List of Catholic dioceses in Iraq =

The Catholic Church of Iraq has no national (Latin) episcopal conference, but is united in an inter-rite Assembly of the Catholic Bishops of Iraq, given its diversity :

- a Latin non-Metropolitan Archdiocese (participation in the transcontinental Arab Region Latin Bishops conference)
- divided over four Eastern Catholic rite-specific particular churches: a Patriarchate, two Metropolitan - and six other archeparchies, three more eparchies and two (pre-diocesan) Patriarchal exarchates.

There is an Apostolic Nunciature to Iraq in the national capital Baghdad, as papal diplomatic representation at embassy-level (Established as Apostolic Delegation of Mesopotamia, Kurdistan and Lesser Armenia, in 1937 renamed as Apostolic Delegation of Iraq, promoted on 1966.10.14), into which is also vested the Apostolic Nunciature to neighbouring (Trans)Jordan.

== Current dioceses ==
=== Latin Church ===
==== Exempt Jurisdiction ====
(non-Metropolitan)

- Archdiocese of Baghdad

=== Chaldean Catholic Church ===
(East Syriac Rite)

==== Patriarchate of Babylon ====
(at Al-Mansour, Baghdad; initially Diocese of Seleucia-Ctesifon)

- Archeparchy of Basra (Bassorah, successor of Perat-Maishan)
- Archeparchy of Arbil
- Archeparchy of Mosul

==== Ecclesiastical Province of Baghdad ====
- Metropolitan Archeparchy of Baghdad
  - Eparchy of Alquoch
  - Eparchy of Amadiyah and Zaku
  - Eparchy of Aqra

==== Ecclesiastical Province of Kirkuk ====
- Metropolitan Archeparchy of Kirkuk-Sulaimaniya (nominal, no suffragan)

=== Syriac Catholic Church ===
(Antiochian Rite)

- Archeparchy of Baghdad
- Archeparchy of Mosul
- Eparchy of Adiabene
- Patriarchal Exarchate of Basra and the Gulf

=== Armenian Catholic Church ===
(Armenian rite)

- Archeparchy of Baghdad

=== Melkite Greek Catholic Church ===
(Byzantine Rite)

- Patriarchal Exarchate of Iraq

== Defunct jurisdictions ==
=== Titular sees ===
- Two Episcopal Titular bishoprics: Anbar of the Chaldeans, Hirta (now Latin)

=== Other defunct jurisdictions ===
TO BE COMPLETED?

Apart from the precursors of the current sees :

Latin :

- Mission sui iuris of Mossul (suppressed)
- Apostolic Prefecture of Syria and Cilicia (formerly and later Mission sui iuris)

Eastern Catholic :

- Chaldean Catholic Eparchy of Sulaimaniya (merged into Kirkuk)
- Chaldean Catholic Eparchy of Zaku (Zākhō; merged into Amadiyah = Amadia)

== See also ==
- List of Catholic dioceses (structured view)
- Christianity in Iraq

== Sources and external links ==
- GCatholic.org - data for all sections.
- Catholic-Hierarchy entry.
