= Diocese of Criciúma =

Catholic ecclesiastical territory

Coordinates: 28.6776°S 49.3695°W

Diocese of Criciúma Dioecesis Criciumensis Criciúma
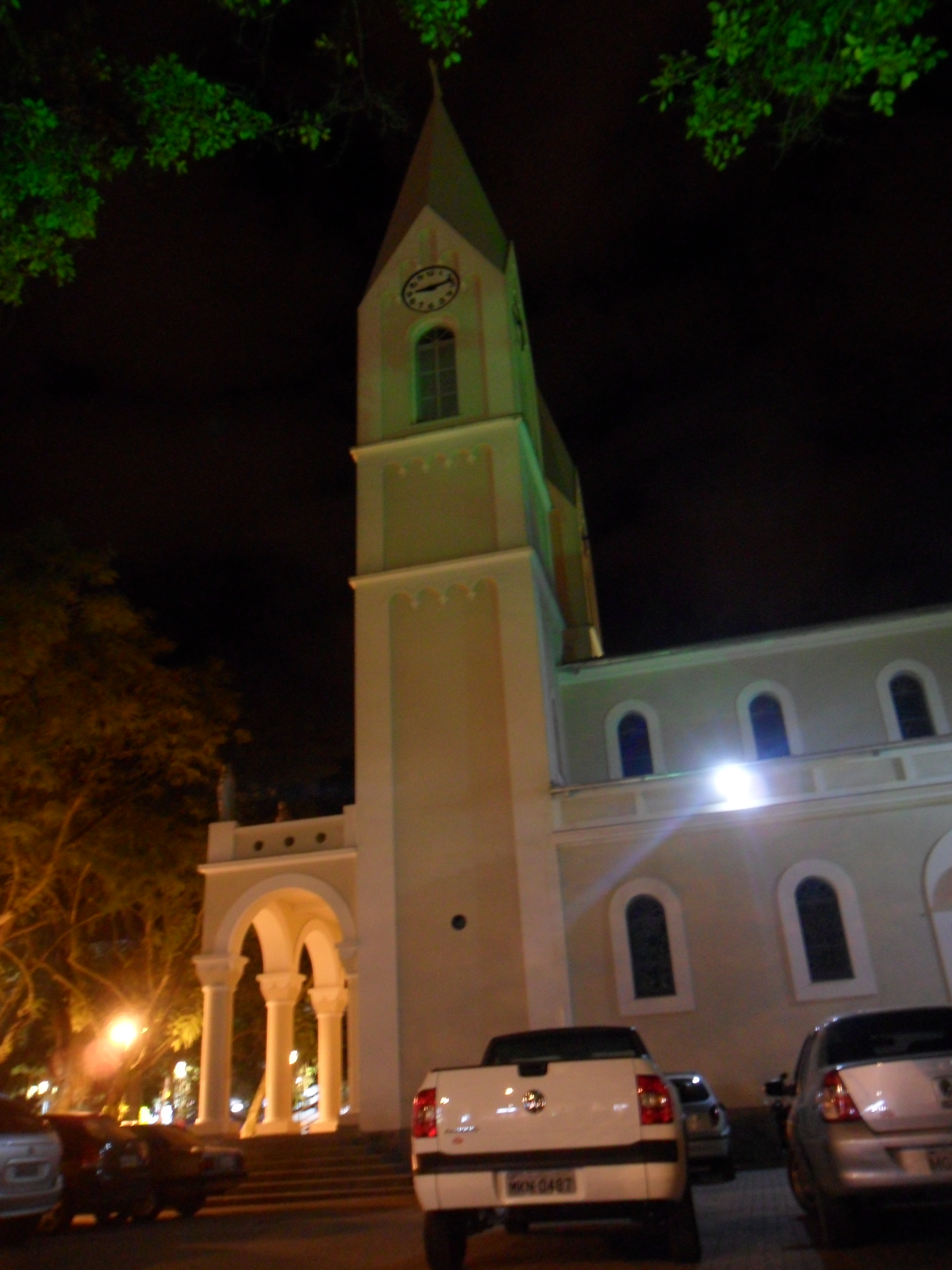
- St. Joseph's Cathedral

Location
- Country: Brazil
- Ecclesiastical province: Florianópolis
- Metropolitan: Florianópolis

Statistics
- Area: 5,093 km^{2} (1,966 sq mi)
- Population: Total; Catholics: (as of 2006); 525,000; 435,000 (82.9%)

Information
- Rite: Latin Rite
- Established: 27 May 1998 (27 years ago)
- Cathedral: Cathedral of St Joseph in Criciúma

Current leadership
- Pope: Leo XIV
- Bishop: Jacinto Inácio Flach
- Metropolitan Archbishop: Wilson Tadeu Jönck, SCI

Website
- www.diocesecriciuma.com.br

The Roman Catholic Diocese of Criciúma (Latin: Dioecesis Criciumensis) is a diocese located in the city of Criciúma in the ecclesiastical province of Florianópolis in Brazil.

== History ==
- 27 May 1998: Established as Diocese of Criciúma from the Diocese of Tubarão

== Bishops ==
- Bishops of Criciúma (Roman rite)
  - Paulo Antônio de Conto (27 May 1998 – 2 July 2008)
  - Jacinto Inácio Flach (16 September 2009 – present)

=== Other priest of this diocese who became bishop ===
- Onécimo Alberton, appointed Bishop of Rio do Sul, Santa Catarina
