= Vito Schlickmann =

Brazilian priest (1928–2023)

His Excellency Vito Schlickmann
- Auxiliary Bishop Emeritus of Florianópolis
- Appointed: 25 January 1995
- Term ended: 3 March 2004
- Other post: Titular Bishop of Gurza (1995–2023)

Orders
- Ordination: 28 November 1954
- Consecration: 25 March 1995 by Eusébio Oscar Scheid

Personal details
- Born: 28 December 1928 São Ludgero, Santa Catarina, Brazil
- Died: 14 February 2023 (aged 94)

Vito Schlickmann (28 December 1928 – 14 February 2023) was a Brazilian Roman Catholic prelate.

Schlickmann was born in Brazil and was ordained to the priesthood in 1954. He served as titular bishop of Gurza and as auxiliary bishop of the Roman Catholic Archdiocese of Florianópolis, Brazil, from 1995 until his retirement in 2004.

Catholic Church titles
Preceded by —	Auxiliary Bishop of Florianópolis; 1995–2004	Succeeded by —
Preceded by Paul-Marie-Maurice Perrin	Titular Bishop of Gurza; 1995–2023	Succeeded by Vacant
