= Richard Brendan Higgins =

Irish American Catholic prelate (born 1944)

His Excellency, The Most Reverend Richard Brendan Higgins
- Auxiliary Bishop Emeritus for the Military Services, USA
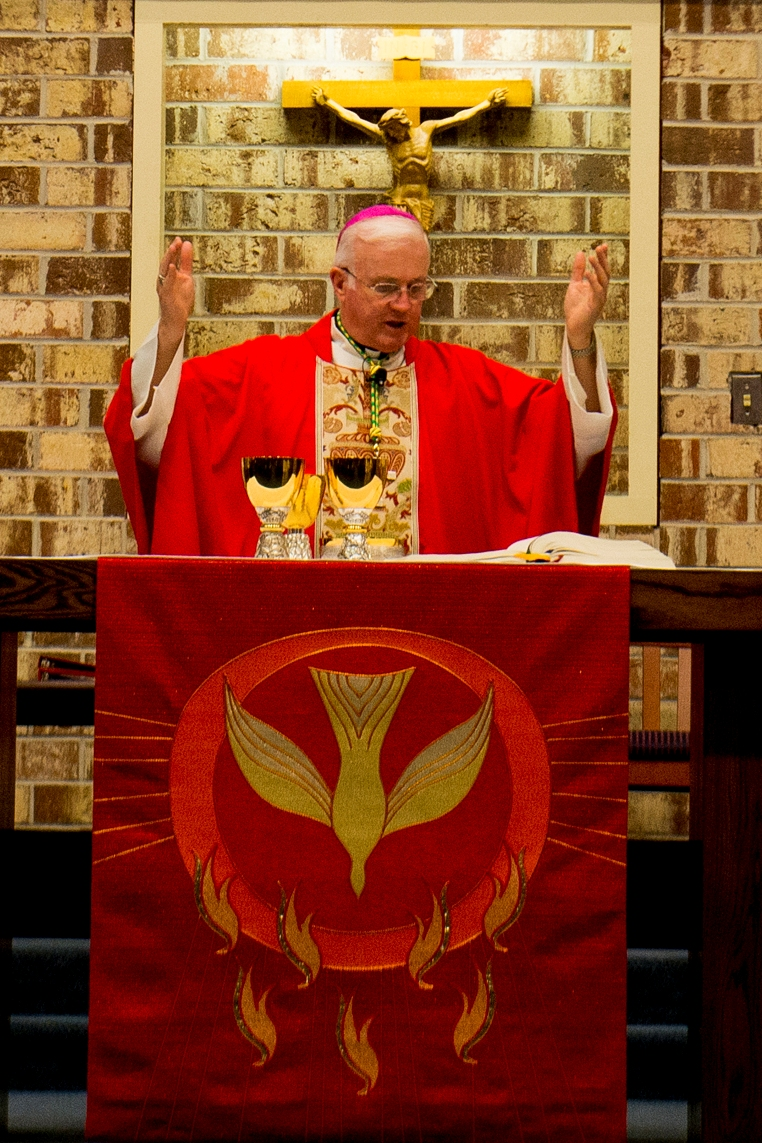
- Higgins in 2013
- Archdiocese: Military Services, USA
- Appointed: May 7, 2004
- Installed: July 3, 2004
- Retired: January 2, 2020
- Other post: Titular Bishop of Casae Calanae (2004‍–‍)

Orders
- Ordination: March 9, 1968 by Luigi Poggi
- Consecration: July 3, 2004 by Edwin Frederick O'Brien, Howard James Hubbard, and William Weigand

Personal details
- Born: February 22, 1944 (age 82) Longford, County Longford, Ireland
- Education: Pontifical Lateran University
- Motto: Ecce ego, mitte me (Latin for 'Here am I, send me')
- Styles
- Reference style: His Excellency; The Most Reverend
- Spoken style: Your Excellency
- Religious style: Bishop

Richard Brendan Higgins KC*HS, USAF (ret) (born February 22, 1944) is an Irish American prelate of the Catholic Church. Higgins served as an auxiliary bishop of the Archdiocese for the Military Services, USA from 2004 to 2020.

== Biography ==
=== Early life ===
Higgins was born on February 22, 1944, in Longford, County Longford, Ireland. He studied for the priesthood at the Pontifical Irish College in Rome, attending the Pontifical Lateran University.

=== Priesthood ===
On March 9, 1968, Higgins was ordained a priest by Archbishop Luigi Poggi for the Diocese of Sacramento at the Basilica of St. John Lateran in Rome. After arriving in California, Higgins served pastoral assignments in Roseville and Grass Valley.

In September 1974, Higgins joined the United States Air Force Chaplain Corps. His assignments as chaplain included:

- Lowry Air Force Base in Denver Colorado
- Naval Air Station Keflavik in Iceland
- Laughlin Air Force Base in Del Rio, Texas
- Bitburg Air Base in Bitburg, Germany
- Malmstrom Air Force Base in Great Falls, Montana
- Maxwell Air Force Base in Montgomery Alabama
- Royal Air Force Lakenheath in Lakenheath, United Kingdom
- Nellis Air Force Base in Las Vegas, Nevada
- Pope Air Force Base in Fayetteville, North Carolina

Higgins's postings also included the Air Command and Staff College in Montgomery, Alabama, the United States Air Force Academy in Colorado Springs, Colorado, the Headquarters United States Air Forces Europe in at Ramstein Air Base in Germany, and Headquarters Pacific Air Forces in Honolulu, Hawaii. While serving in the USAF, Higgins was awarded an Airline Transport Pilot Certificate and several flight instructor certificates.

In 1997, Pope John Paul II named Higgins an honorary prelate of his holiness, with the title of monsignor.

=== Auxiliary Bishop of the Military Services, USA ===
On May 7, 2004, John Paul II appointed Higgins as an auxiliary bishop of the Archdiocese of the Military Services, USA and as titular bishop of Casae Calanae. He was consecrated on July 3, 2004, at the Basilica of the National Shrine of the Immaculate Conception in Washington, D.C. His principal consecrator was Archbishop Edwin O'Brien; his co-consecrators were Bishops Howard Hubbard and William Weigand.

On September 1, 2004, Higgins retired from the US Air Force with the rank of colonel. His military decorations include the Legion of Merit with one oak leaf cluster and the Air Force Meritorious Service Medal with seven oak leaf clusters.

=== Retirement ===
On January 2, 2020, Pope Francis accepted Higgins's resignation as auxiliary bishop of the Military Services, USA, which he submitted on reaching age 75, as required by canon law.

== See also ==
- Military chaplain
- United States Air Force Chaplain Corps
- United States military chaplains

Catholic Church titles
Preceded by –	Auxiliary Bishop for the Military Services, USA; 2004 – 2020	Succeeded by –
