= François Désiré Drure =

François Désiré Jean Drure OCD
- Archbishop of Baghdad
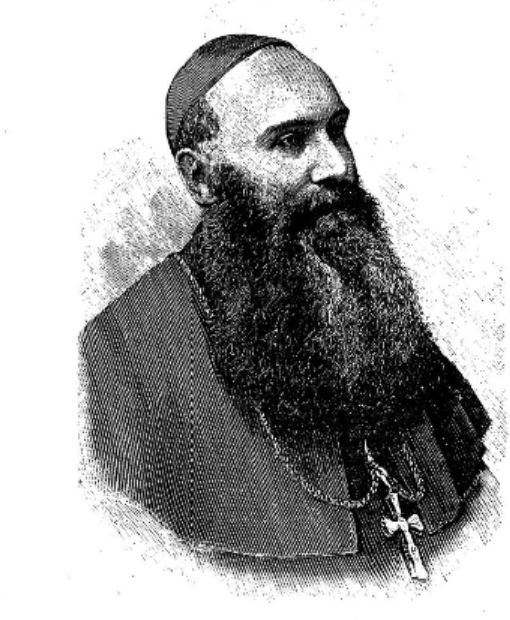
- Church: Chaldean Catholic Church
- Archdiocese: Archdiocese of Baghdad
- In office: 7 November 1902 – 27 May 1917
- Predecessor: Henri-Victor Altmayer
- Successor: François Berré
- Other post: Apostolic Delegate to Mesopotamia, Kurdistan, and Lesser Armenia (1904-1917)

Orders
- Ordination: 24 March 1883
- Consecration: 16 November 1902 by Girolamo Maria Gotti

Personal details
- Born: 30 January 1859 Digoin, Saône-et-Loire, French Empire
- Died: 27 May 1917 (aged 58) Verneix, Allier, France

François Désiré Jean Drure, OCD (30 January 1859 – 27 May 1917) was a French prelate of the Catholic Church who worked in Iraq as a bishop and apostolic delegate.

== Biography ==
François Désiré Jean Drure was born on 30 January 1859 in Digoin, France. He studied at the minor seminary in Semur-en-Brionnais and the major seminary in Autun. He was ordained a priest on 24 March 1883. In July 1884 he earned a degree in mathematics from the Faculté Catholique de Lyon and in October became a professor at the minor seminary in Rimont. He then, with the endorsement of the bishop of Autun, joined the Carmelites at Montélimar where he took the name Father John of the Holy Family. He took his final vows as a member of the Discalced Carmelites on 8 September 1892. (Note: According to Filoni, Drure began his work as a missionary in Basra in 1893, but other sources omit that or specify that he was in Montélimar when named to Baghdad.)

On 7 November 1902, Pope Leo XIII appointed him Archbishop of Baghdad. He received his episcopal consecration from Cardinal Girolamo Maria Gotti, another Carmelite, on 16 November 1902.

On 5 March 1904, Pope Pius X named him Apostolic Delegate to Mesopotamia, Kurdistan, and Lesser Armenia. He was visiting France when World War One began and hostilities in the Ottoman Empire prevented him from returning to Mosul.

Drure died unexpectedly in his sleep at the chateau of Fragne near Montluçon, France, where the Carmelites of Meaux had taken refuge, on 27 May 1917 at the age of 58.
