= Mirosław Stanisław Wachowski =

Polish Catholic prelate

His Excellency, The Most Reverend Mirosław Stanisław Wachowski
- Apostolic Nuncio to Iraq
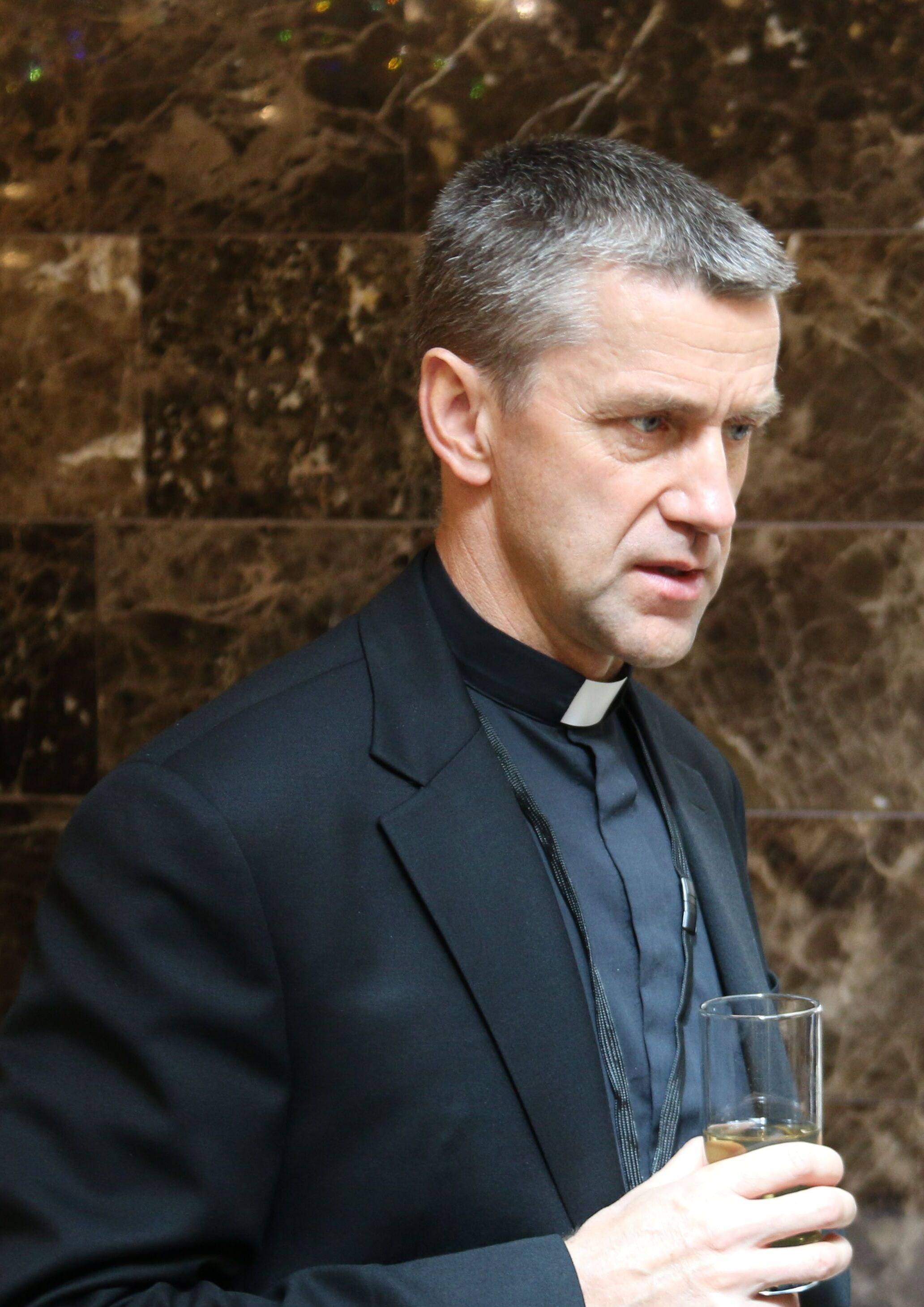
- Wachowski in 2017
- Church: Catholic
- Appointed: 18 September 2025
- Predecessor: Mitja Leskovar
- Other post: Titular Archbishop of Villamagna in Proconsulari
- Previous posts: Under-Secretary for Relations with States, Secretariat of State (2019-2025)

Orders
- Ordination: 15 June 1996
- Consecration: 26 October 2025 by Pope Leo XIV, Paul Gallagher and Jerzy Mazur

Personal details
- Born: 8 May 1970 (age 56) Pisz, Poland
- Motto: Gloria Deo pax hominibus (Latin for 'Glory to God and peace to men')

Styles of Mirosław Stanisław Wachowski
- Reference style: His Excellency; The Most Reverend
- Spoken style: Your Excellency
- Religious style: Archbishop

Mirosław Stanisław Wachowski (born 8 May 1970) is a Polish prelate of the Catholic Church who works in the diplomatic service of the Holy See. Since September 2025, he serves as Apostolic Nuncio to Iraq.

== Biography ==
Wachowski was born in Pisz, Poland, on 8 May 1970. He was ordained a priest on 15 June 1996, and incardinated in the Diocese of Ełk. He became vicar of the Parish of the Sacred Heart of Jesus in Augustów and earned a degree in canon law from the Pontifical Lateran University.

== Diplomatic career ==
He studied at the Pontifical Ecclesiastical Academy and entered the diplomatic service of the Holy See on 1 July 2004. He served in the nunciature in Senegal; at the Permanent Mission to the International Atomic Energy Agency (I.A.E.A.), the Organization for Security and Cooperation in Europe (O.S.C.E.) and in the United Nations Office and Specialized Institutions in Vienna; at the nunciature in Poland; and in Rome as nunciature counselor in the Section for Relations with States of the Holy See's Secretariat of State. On 13 July 2007, he received the title of Chaplain of His Holiness.

Pope Francis appointed him Under-Secretary for Relations with States on 24 October 2019.

On 18 September 2025, he was appointed apostolic nuncio to Iraq and titular archbishop of Villamagna in Proconsulari. He received his consecration on 26 October 2025 in St. Peter's Basilica from Pope Leo XIV. He chose as his episcopal motto Gloria Deo Pax Hominibus.

== See also ==
- List of heads of the diplomatic missions of the Holy See

Diplomatic posts
Preceded by Antoine Camilleri	Undersecretary for Relations with States; 24 October 2019 – 18 September 2025	Succeeded by Mihăiţă Blaj
Preceded by Mitja Leskovar	Apostolic Nuncio to Iraq; 2025 – present	Incumbent
