= Diocese of Tubarão =

Catholic ecclesiastical territory

Diocese of Tubarão Dioecesis Tubaraoënsis Diocese de Blumenau
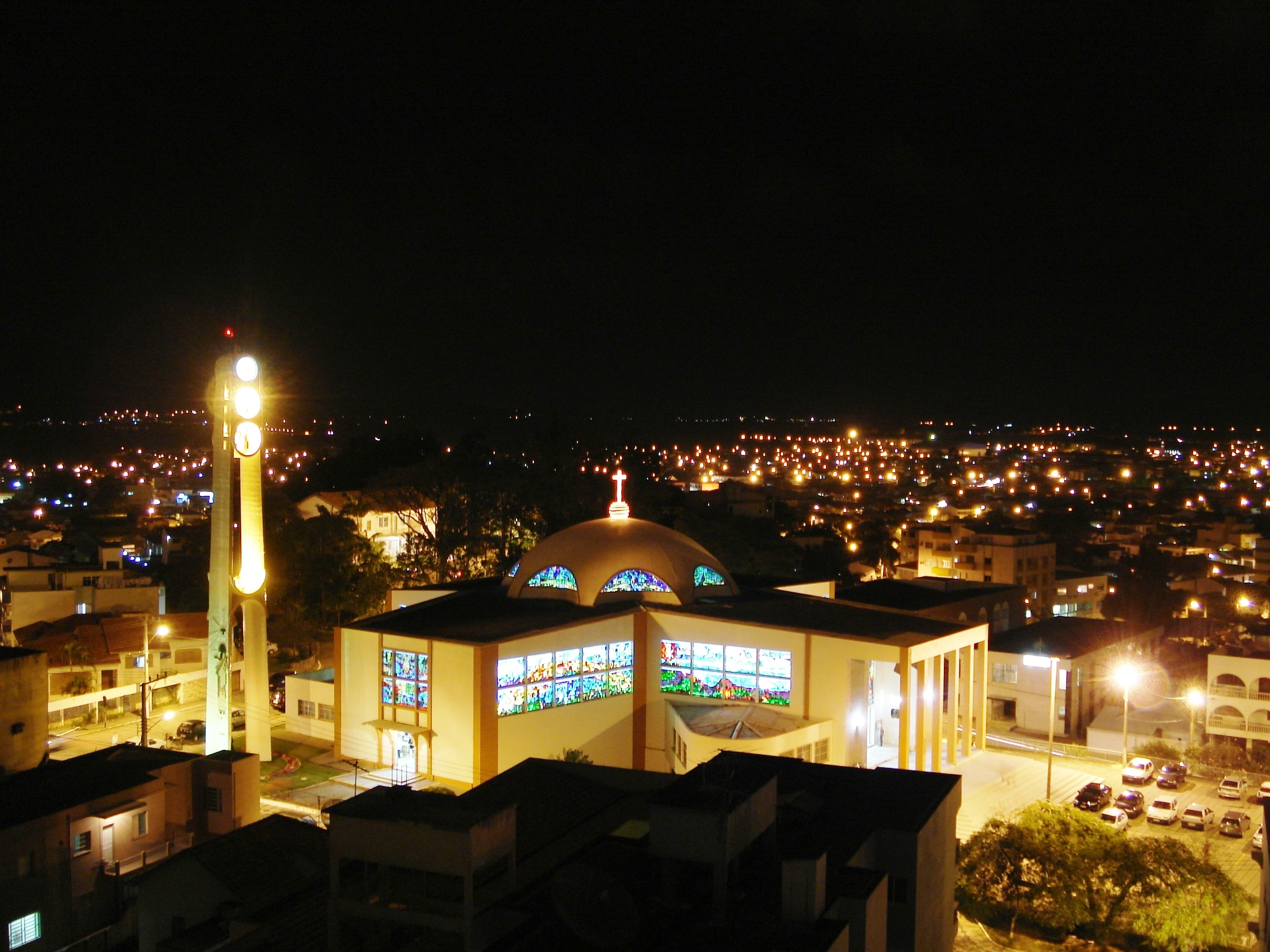
- Cathedral of Our Lady of Mercy

Location
- Country: Brazil
- Ecclesiastical province: Florianópolis
- Metropolitan: Florianópolis

Statistics
- Area: 4,531 km^{2} (1,749 sq mi)
- Population: Total; Catholics: (as of 2010); 355,435; 309,579 (87.1%)

Information
- Denomination: Catholic Church
- Rite: Roman Rite
- Established: 28 December 1954 (71 years ago)
- Cathedral: Cathedral of Our Lady of Mercy in Tubarão

Current leadership
- Pope: Leo XIV
- Bishop: Adilson Pedro Busin, C.S.
- Metropolitan Archbishop: Wilson Tadeu Jönck, S.C.I.
- Bishops emeritus: Hilário Moser, S.D.B.

Website
- Website of the Diocese

The Roman Catholic Diocese of Tubarão (Latin: Dioecesis Tubaraoënsis) is a diocese located in the city of Tubarão in the ecclesiastical province of Florianópolis in Brazil.

== History ==
- 28 December 1954: Established as Diocese of Tubarão from the Metropolitan Archdiocese of Florianópolis

== Leadership ==
=== Bishops of Tubarão (Roman rite) ===
- Anzelm Pietrulla, O.F.M. (11 May 1955 – 17 September 1981), retired
- Osório Bebber, O.F.M. Cap. (17 September 1981 – 18 January 1992), appointed Prelate of Coxim, Mato Grosso do Sul
- Hilário Moser, S.D.B. (27 May 1992 – 15 June 2004), resigned
- Jacinto Bergmann (15 June 2004 – 1 July 2009), appointed Bishop of Pelotas, Rio Grande do Sul
- Wilson Tadeu Jönck, S.C.I. (26 May 2010 – 28 September 2011), appointed Archbishop of Florianópolis, Santa Catarina
- João Francisco Salm (26 September 2012 – 19 January 2022), appointed Bishop of Novo Hamburgo, Rio Grande do Sul
- Adilson Pedro Busin, C.S. (3 May 2023 – Present)
