= Latin Cathedral of St. Joseph =

Latin Cathedral in Baghdad, Iraq

Coordinates: 33°20′20″N 44°23′48″E

St. Joseph's Cathedral
- كاتدرائية القديس يوسف
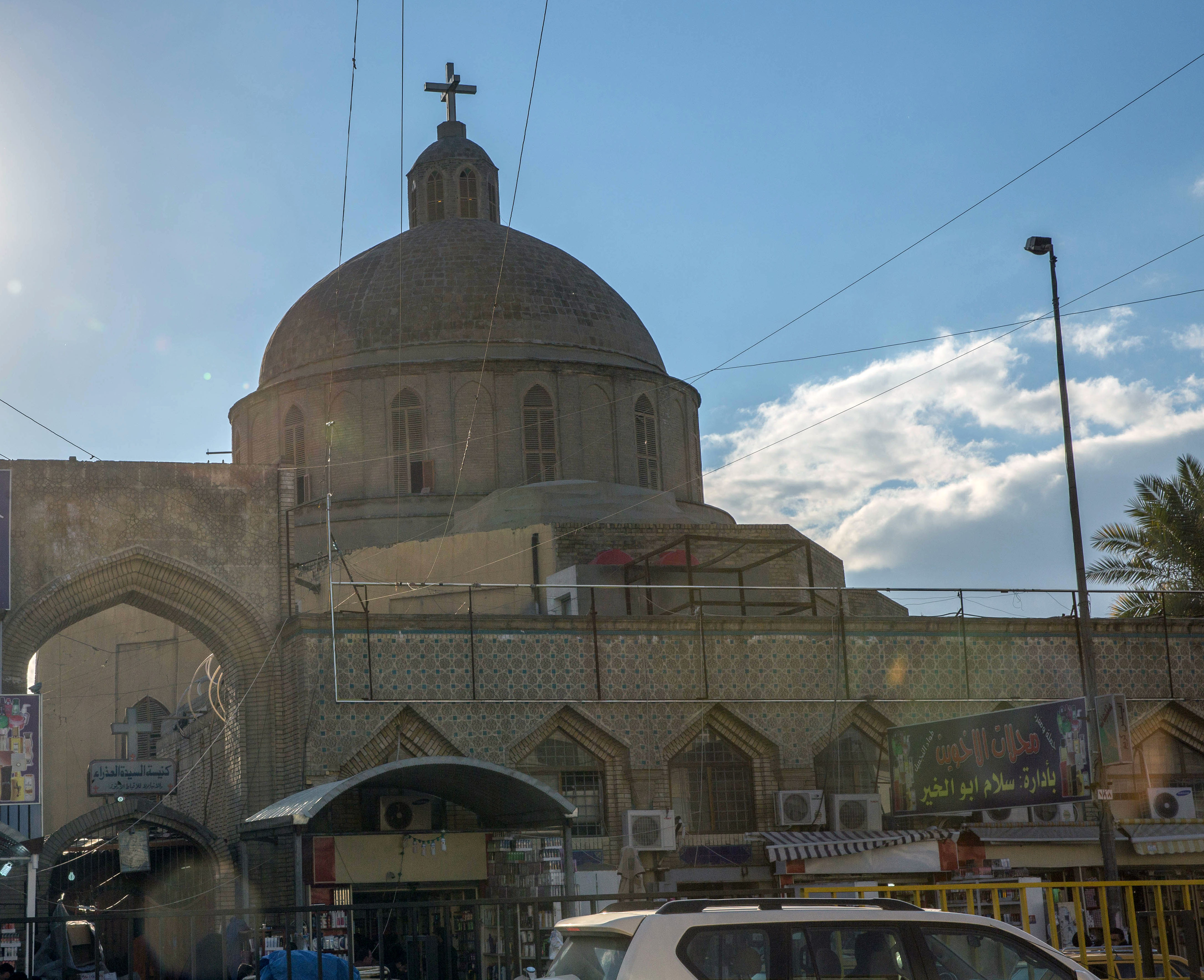
- St. Joseph's Cathedral (Latin Church) of Baghdad, 2016
- St. Joseph's Cathedral
- Location: Shorja, Baghdad
- Country: Iraq
- Denomination: Catholic Church

Administration
- Diocese: Roman Catholic Archdiocese of Baghdad

The St. Joseph's Cathedral (Arabic: كاتدرائية القديس يوسف) or Latin Cathedral of St. Joseph or Church of the Latins (Arabic: كنيسة اللاتين) or Church of the Virgin Lady (Arabic: كنيسة السيدة العذراء), is a Catholic cathedral located on al-Jumhuriya Street in Baghdad, the capital of Iraq.

Because it is in the jurisdiction of the Latin Church, it is sometimes called the Latin Cathedral of St. Joseph to distinguish it from the Chaldean Cathedral of St. Joseph dedicated to the same saint but belonging to the Chaldean Catholic Church (also in communion with the Holy See). St. Joseph's functions as the cathedral of the Archdiocese of Baghdad (Bagdathensis Latinorum), which was established in 1643 as a diocese and elevated to its present status in 1848.

The Cathedral's churchyard also contains the tomb of Anastase-Marie al-Karmali (1866–1947), an Iraqi Catholic priest and Discalced Carmelite friar, as well as a lexicologist, lexicographer, and philologist of the Arabic language.

== History ==
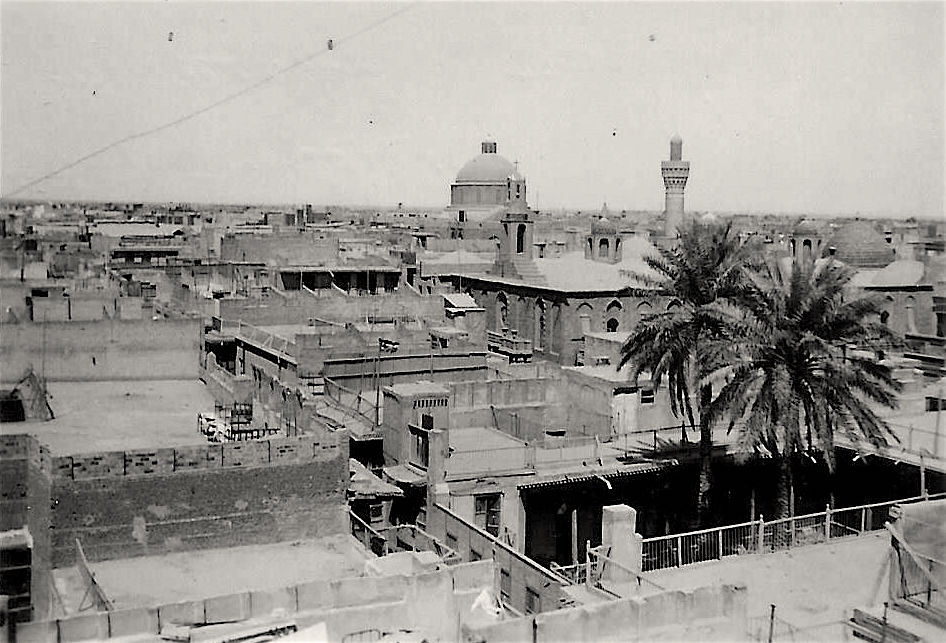
St. Joseph's Cathedral next to al-Khulafa Mosque in 1942.

The Cathedral was built at the end of the 19th century on the land that had been a school of the same name since 1737. It was completed in Baghdad in 1871 after five years of work and was built for the Latin community in the city. During World War I, the Cathedral was turned into a hospital by the Ottomans, but after Ottoman defeat, the cathedral returned to a place of worship and was renovated in 1923. During World War II, Polish troops stationed in Baghdad in 1942 and 1943 celebrated Divine Liturgy in the cathedral along with the bishops. One of these bishops, Bishop Joseph Gaolina, has a bronze statue dedicated to him inside the cathedral.

In recent years, the cathedral has suffered from neglect due to government oversight and is in dire need of restoration. The paint on the exterior and dome is worn out and requires extensive restoration, and the exterior joints must be treated to ensure the roof is waterproof. It has also been suffering from inconvenience due to the Shorja market it is surrounded by and the exodus of Christians from the areas that surround the Church to more modern neighborhoods in the city. Despite this, the cathedral remains one of the most important landmarks for Christians living in the old Christian quarter of Baghdad.

== Architecture ==
The cathedral is built in Iraqi architecture and uses traditional bricks that were used in Iraq to build structures, including both mosques and churches. The walls of the cathedral are 4 meters thick in order to keep warmth during winter and keep cool in the summer and its level of the foundations are slightly below street level due to subsidence of the ground. All the doors and windows of the building are embowed, representing an Abbasid-inspired architecture. The building is topped with a 32-meter hemispherical dome with a circular cylinder and windows at the level of the church wing, and at the top is a cross. The churchyard contains a graveyard that includes the tombs of the Carmelite fathers, the founders of the Church, as well as graves of monks and nuns. The tomb of Anastase-Marie al-Karmali is also located here.

== See also ==
- Christianity in Iraq
- Roman Catholicism in Iraq
- St. Joseph's Cathedral (disambiguation)
