= Casae Calanae =

Town in the Roman province of Numidia

Casae Calanae was a town in the Roman province of Numidia.

The names of two bishops of the town are known. The Catholic bishop Fortunatus took part in the Conference of Carthage (411) that brought together both Catholic and Donatist bishops of Roman Africa. On that occasion Casae Calanae had no Donatist bishop. Optantius was one of the Catholic bishops whom the Vandal king Huneric summoned to Carthage in 484 and then exiled.

No longer a residential bishopric, Casae Calane is today listed by the Catholic Church as a titular see.

The first titular bishop of the see was appointed on 10 June 1966. The see's current bishop is Richard Higgins, an auxiliary bishop of the Archdiocese for the Military Services, USA.
