= Roman Catholic Archdiocese of Baghdad =

Catholic archdiocese in Iraq

Coordinates: 33.3389°N 44.3966°E

Archdiocese of Baghdad Archdioecesis Bagdathensis Latinorum
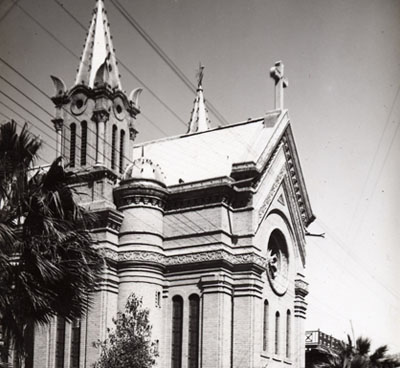
- A Latin Church in Baghdad

Location
- Country: Iraq
- Ecclesiastical province: Immediately subject to the Holy See

Information
- Sui iuris church: Latin Church
- Rite: Roman Rite
- Cathedral: Latin Cathedral of St. Joseph, Baghdad

Current leadership
- Pope: Leo XIV
- Archbishop: Jean Benjamin Sleiman, OCD

The Archdiocese of Baghdad (Latin: Bagdathen(sis) Latinorum) is a Latin Catholic ecclesiastical territory or diocese of the Catholic Church in Baghdad, Iraq. It has jurisdiction over three parishes of 2,500 Latin Catholics who live throughout Iraq. The diocese is immediately subject to the Holy See. It operates alongside seven Chaldean dioceses, three Syrian Catholic, one Greek-Melkite jurisdiction, and one Armenian Catholic diocese, all of which are in communion with the Holy See. The archdiocese's cathedral is the Latin Cathedral of St. Joseph in Baghdad, not to be confused with the Chaldean Cathedral of St. Joseph located in Baghdad and the Chaldean Cathedral of St. Joseph located in Ankawa, Iraq.

== History ==
- September 6, 1632: Established as the Diocese of Babylon or Baghdad
- August 19, 1848: Promoted as the Archdiocese of Baghdad

== Leadership ==
=== Diocese of Baghdad ===
Erected: 6 September 1632

- Timoteo Pérez Vargas, OCD (6 September 1632 – 23 December 1639 Resigned)
- Jean Duval, OCD (16 August 1638 – 10 April 1669 Died)
- Placide-Louis du Chemin, OSB (10 April 1669 – 7 November 1682 Died)
- François Picquet (26 April 1683 – 26 August 1686 Died)
- Louis-Marie Pidou de Saint-Olon, CR (24 November 1687 – 20 November 1717 Died)
- Dominique Marie Varlet (20 February 1719 – 25 May 1719 Removed)
- Emmanuel a S. Alberto (Bruno) Baillet (Ballyet), OCD (26 November 1742 – 4 April 1773 Died)
- Jean-Baptiste Miroudot Du Bourg, OCist (15 April 1776 – 13 April 1791 Removed)
- Georges Bock, OCD (17 April 1804 Appointed – )
- Blaise de Saint-Matthieu, OCD (27 November 1807 Appointed – )
- Antonio Prandi, OCD (15 May 1813 Appointed – )
- Felice Piazza, OCD (6 February 1816 Appointed – )
- Pierre-Alexandre Coupperie (2 May 1820 - 26 April 1831 Died)
- Pierre-Dominique-Marcellin Bonamie, SSCC (4 May 1832 – 13 February 1835 Appointed Archbishop of İzmir)
- Marie-Laurent Trioche (14 March 1837 - 28 November 1887 Died)

=== Archdiocese of Baghdad ===
Elevated: 19 August 1848

- Marie-Laurent Trioche (14 March 1837 – 28 November 1887 Died)
- Henri-Victor Altmayer, OP (24 November 1887 – 23 August 1902 Resigned)
- François Désiré Jean Drure, OCD (7 November 1902 – 27 May 1917 Died)
- François Berré, OP (9 August 1921 — 4 April 1929 Died)
- Armand-Etienne M. Blanquet du Chayla, OCD (1 April 1939 – 17 September 1964 Retired)
- Maurice Perrin (2 Aug 1965 – 16 January 1970 Appointed Titular Archbishop of Gurza)
- Ernest-Marie de Jésus-Hostie Charles Albert Nyary, OCD (23 March 1972 – 30 May 1983 Retired)
- Paul Dahdah, OCD (30 May 1983 – 30 July 1999 Appointed Vicar Apostolic of Beirut)
- Jean Benjamin Sleiman, OCD (29 November 2000 – present)

== See also ==
- Religion in Iraq
- Christianity in Iraq
- Freedom of religion in Iraq
- List of Catholic dioceses in Iraq
- Catholic Church by country
