= Archdiocese of Florianópolis =

Latin Catholic jurisdiction in Brazil

Coordinates: 27.5964°S 48.5494°W

Archdiocese of Florianópolis Archidioecesis Florianopolitanus Arquidiocese de Florianópolis
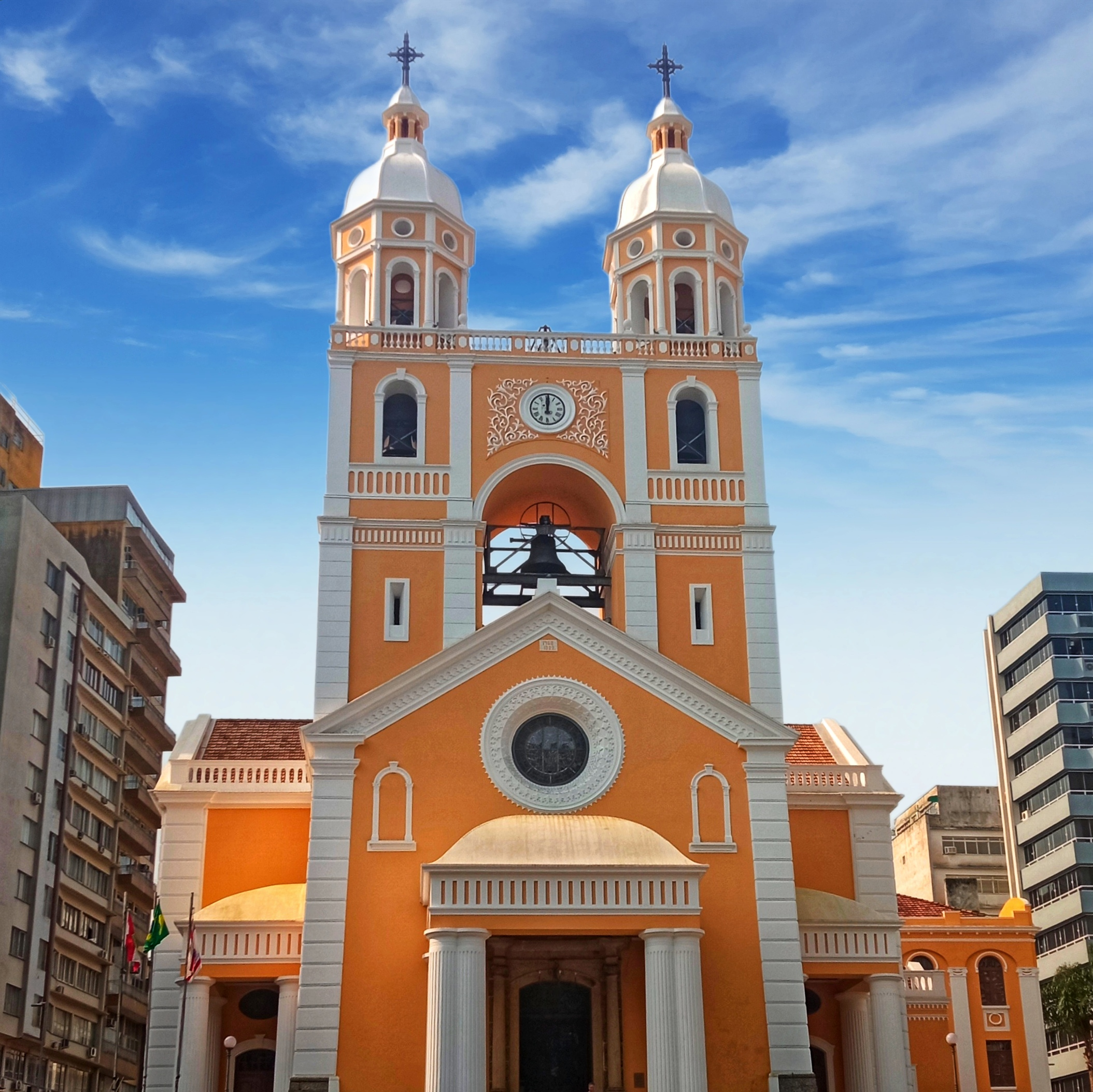
- Metropolitan Cathedral of Our Lady of Exile

- Coat of arms

Location
- Country: Brazil
- Ecclesiastical province: Florianópolis

Statistics
- Area: 7,862 km^{2} (3,036 sq mi)
- Population: Total; Catholics: (as of 2006); 1,385,000; 1,080,000 (78.0%)

Information
- Denomination: Catholic Church
- Sui iuris church: Latin Church
- Rite: Roman Rite
- Established: 19 March 1908 (117 years ago)
- Cathedral: Cathedral of Our Lady of Exile in Florianópolis

Current leadership
- Pope: Leo XIV
- Metropolitan Archbishop: Wilson Tadeu Jönck, S.C.I.

Website
- www.arquifln.org.br

The Archdiocese of Florianópolis (Latin: Archidioecesis Florianopolitanus) is an archdiocese located in the city of Florianópolis in Brazil.

== History ==
- March 19, 1908: Established as Diocese of Santa Caterina from the Diocese of Curitiba
- January 17, 1927: Promoted as Metropolitan Archdiocese of Florianópolis

== Bishops ==
=== Ordinaries ===
- Bishops of Santa Caterina (Latin Rite)
  - João Batista Becker (1908.05.03 – 1912.08.01), appointed Archbishop of Porto Alegre, Rio Grande do Sul
  - João Borges Quintão, C.M. (1913), did not take effect
  - Joaquim Domingues de Oliveira (1914.04.02 – 1927.01.17)
- Archbishops of Florianópolis (Latin Rite)
  - Joaquim Domingues de Oliveira (1927.01.17 – 1967.05.18)
  - Alfonso Niehues (1967.05.18 – 1991.01.23)
  - Eusébio Oscar Scheid, S.C.I. Dehonians (1991.01.23 – 2001.07.25), appointed Archbishop of São Sebastião do Rio de Janeiro (Cardinal in 2003)
  - Murilo Sebastião Ramos Krieger, S.C.J. (2002.02.20 – 2011.01.12), appointed Archbishop of São Salvador da Bahia
  - Wilson Tadeu Jönck, S.C.I. (28 September 2011 – )

=== Coadjutor archbishops ===
- Félix César da Cunha Vasconcellos, O.F.M. (1957–1965), did not succeed to see; appointed Archbishop of Ribeirão Preto, São Paulo
- Alfonso Niehues (1965–1967)

=== Auxiliary bishops ===
- Murilo Sebastião Ramos Krieger, S.C.I. (1985–1991), appointed Archbishop here
- Vito Schlickmann (1995–2004)
- Giuseppe (José) Negri, P.I.M.E. (2005–2009), appointed Bishop of Blumenau, Santa Catarina

=== Other priests of this diocese who became bishops ===
- Jaime de Barros Câmara, appointed Bishop of Mossoró, Rio Grande do Norte in 1935; future Cardinal
- Wilson Laus Schmidt, appointed Auxiliary Bishop of São Sebastião do Rio de Janeiro in 1957
- Manoel João Francisco, appointed Bishop of Chapecó, Santa Catarina in 1998
- Augustinho Petry, appointed Auxiliary Bishop of Brazil, Military in 2000
- João Francisco Salm, appointed Bishop of Tubarão, Santa Catarina in 2012

== Suffragan dioceses ==
- Diocese of Criciúma
- Diocese of Tubarão

== Sources ==
- GCatholic.org
- Catholic Hierarchy
- Archdiocese website (Portuguese)
