= Maurice Perrin (bishop) =

French prelate

- Titular Archbishop of Gurza
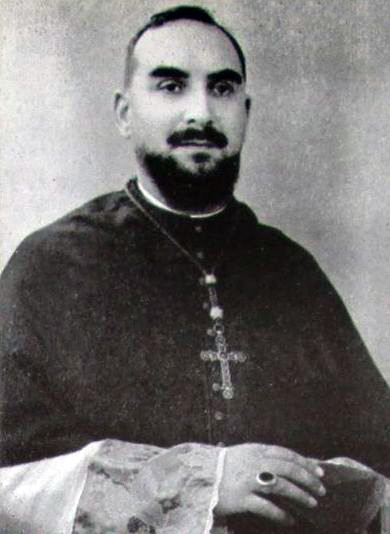
- Church: Catholic Church
- See: Gurza
- In office: 16 January 1970 – 3 October 1994
- Predecessor: Jerome J. Hastrich
- Successor: Vito Schlickmann
- Previous posts: Apostolic Pro-Nuncio to Ethiopia (1970-1972); Apostolic Pro-Nunio to Iraq (1966-1970); Archbishop of Baghdad (1965-1970); Apostolic Delegate to Iraq (1965-1966); Prelate of Tunis (1964-1965); Archbishop of Carthage (1953-1964); Titular Bishop of Utica (1947-1953); Auxiliary Bishop of Carthage (1947-1953)

Orders
- Ordination: 29 June 1936
- Consecration: 28 October 1947 by Charles-Albert Gounot

Personal details
- Born: Paul-Marie-Maurice Perrin; 30 June 1904 Grenoble, Isère, French Third Republic
- Died: 3 October 1994 (aged 90)

Paul-Marie-Maurice Perrin (30 June 1904 – 3 October 1994) was a French prelate of the Catholic Church who worked in Tunisia, including more than a decade as Archbishop of Carthage. He oversaw the dismantling of the Church's presence there with the end of French colonial rule in Tunisia. He then worked in Iraq as both archbishop and diplomat from 1965 to 1970 and ended his career as the Holy See's representative in Ethiopia from 1970 to 1972.

== Biography ==
Maurice Perrin was born on 30 June 1904 in Grenoble, France. He moved to Tunisia as a child and studied there and in Beirut before earning an engineering degree in France in 1927. He worked as an engineer in northern France for three years before returning to Tunis and entering the seminary. He was ordained a priest of the Archdiocese of Carthage, Tunisia, on 29 June 1936.

On 7 June 1947, Pope Pius XII appointed him titular archbishop of Utica and auxiliary bishop of Carthage. He received his episcopal consecration on 28 October 1947 from Charles-Albert Gounot, Archbishop of Carthage. On 29 October 1953, Pope Pius named him Archbishop of Carthage.

Perrin became Archbishop as Tunisia was struggling to establish its independence from France. Having achieved its independence on 20 March 1956, Tunisia then asserted its national aspirations against the Europeans, including restrictions on Christian worship. After years of negotiations, the Holy See and Tunisia signed an agreement called a modus vivendi that ceded all but a few Church properties to the government.

On 9 July 1964, the Archdiocese of Carthage was reorganized as the Territorial Prelature of Tunis. Perrin became the Territorial Prelate and titular archbishop of Nova. He held that post of territorial prelate for exactly six months before leaving Tunisia "at the request of the government" and receiving from Pope Paul the honorific title of Assistant to the Papal throne on 4 January 1965. (Note: His successor, Michel Callens, was appointed almost immediately on 9 July 1965. Callens was a 46-year-old native of Paris and a member of the White Fathers.)

Pope Paul VI named Perrin Apostolic Delegate to Iraq on 31 July 1965 and Archbishop of Baghdad on 2 August. (Note: The Acta Apostolicae Sedis does not record his appointment as Delegate to Iraq but identifies him by that title in the entry for his appointment as Archbishop of Baghdad.) He was the first representative of the Holy See given diplomatic status by the Iraqi Republic. His pastoral role was minimal. On 14 October 1966 his title changed to Apostolic Pro-Nuncio to Iraq.

On 16 January 1970, Pope Paul appointed him Apostolic Pro-Nuncio to Ethiopia and titular archbishop of Gurza. (Note: The Acta Apostolicae Sedis only records the assignment of his titular see, not his diplomat's posting.) He retired at age 68 as he was replaced in Ethiopia in November 1972 by Ippolito Rotoli.

He died on 3 October 1994.
