= Apostolic Nunciature to Iraq =

Diplomatic post of the Holy See

The Apostolic Nuncio to Iraq is the representative of the Holy See in Iraq. He is appointed by the pope and represents all Catholics in the country, both Latin Rite and Eastern Catholic. Since 1966 the government of Iraq has had full diplomatic relations with the Holy See and as such the papal representative is titled Nuncio. During the 2003 Iraq War, the Holy See was the only sovereign state to keep its ambassador in Iraq.

== Apostolic Delegates and Nuncios ==
Apostolic Delegate to Mesopotamia, Kurdistan, and Lesser Armenia

- Henri-Marie Amanton (10 March 1857 - 27 March 1865 )
- Eugène-Louis-Marie Lion (13 March 1874 - 8 August 1883)
- Henri-Victor Altamayer, OP (27 March 1884 - 28 August 1902)
- François Désiré Drure, OCD (5 March 1904 - 27 May 1917)
- François Berré, OP (19 September 1922 – 4 May 1929)
- Antonin Drapier, OP (23 November 1929 – 19 November 1936)

Apostolic Delegate to Iraq

- Georges-Marie de Jonghe d'Ardoye, MEP (17 October 1938 – 6 July 1947)
- Armand-Etienne M. Blanquet du Chayla, OCD (20 November 1948 – 17 September 1964 )
- Maurice Perrin (31 July 1965 - 16 January 1970)

Apostolic Pro-Nuncios

- Paolo Mosconi (11 April 1970 - May 1971)
- Jean Rupp (8 May 1971 - 1978)
- Antonio del Giudice (22 December 1978 - 20 August 1982)
- Luigi Conti (19 November 1983 - 17 January 1987)
- Marian Oleś (28 November 1987 - 9 April 1994)

Apostolic Nuncios

- Giuseppe Lazzarotto (23 July 1994 - 11 November 2000)
- Fernando Filoni (17 January 2001 - 25 February 2006)
- Francis Chullikatt (29 April 2006 - 17 July 2010)
- Giorgio Lingua (4 September 2010 - 17 March 2015)
- Alberto Ortega Martín (1 August 2015 – 7 October 2019)
- Mitja Leskovar (1 May 2020 – 16 April 2024)
- Mirosław Stanisław Wachowski (18 September 2025 – present)
