= Mission sui iuris of Mossul =

Former Latin Catholic jurisdiction in Iraq

The Mission sui iuris of Mossul was a Latin Church missionary pre-diocesan jurisdiction of the Catholic Church in northern Iraq, primarily Kurdistan.

It was exempt, i.e. directly dependent on the Holy See (notably the Congregation Propaganda Fide), not part of any ecclesiastical province.

It was established in 1750, without formal Latin precursor jurisdiction, and suppressed in 1969, without formal successor.

== Ordinaries ==
(all Latin Church missionaries)

Ecclesiastical Superiors of Mossul

- Father Domenico Berré, Dominican Order (O.P.) (? – 1921)
- Gundisalvo Galland, O.P. (1923 – 1924)
- Bertrando Labbé, O.P. (1931 – 1937)
- Ceslas Tunmer, O.P. (1937 – 1953)
- Joseph Omez, O.P. (1953 – 1969)

== See also ==
- Chaldean Catholic Archeparchy of Mossul
- Syrian Catholic Archeparchy of Mossul
- Roman Catholic Archdiocese of Baghdad
