= Delkos =

Town of ancient Thrace

Coordinates: 41°20′17″N 28°40′36″E

Delkos (Ancient Greek: Δέλκως), or Delcus, was a town of ancient Thrace. Under the name of Delcus it was a bishopric and later a titular see, now suppressed, of the Roman Catholic Church. It was later called Derkos, under which name it again was a bishopric and later a titular see of the Roman Catholic Church. The Orthodox diocese remains extant (see Metropolis of Derkoi).

Its site is located near Derkoz in European Turkey.
